= Studio Gang =

American architectural and design firm

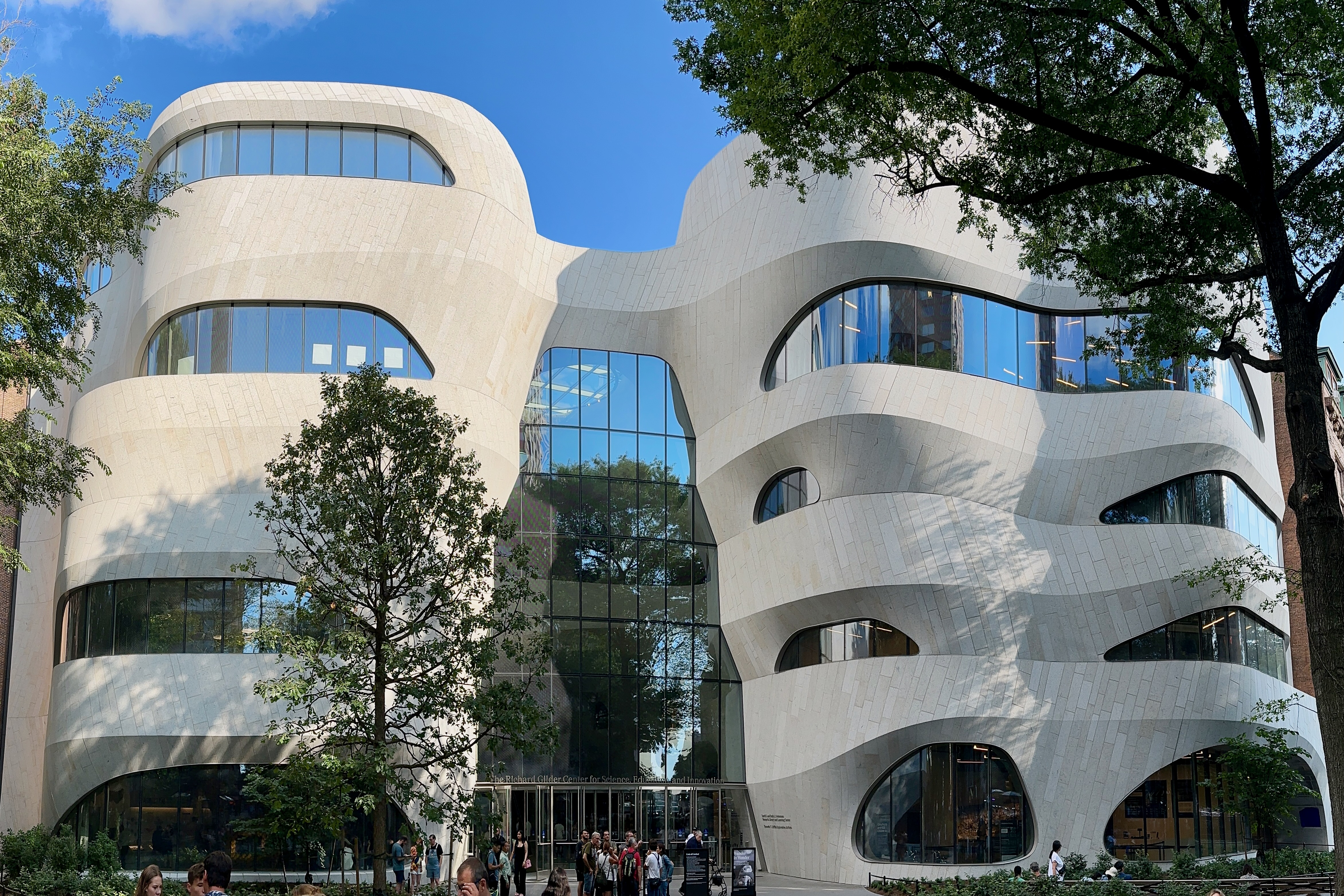
- Richard Gilder Center

Practice information
- Key architects: Jeanne Gang
- Founded: 1997
- Location: Chicago, Illinois • New York, New York • San Francisco, California • Paris, France

Significant works and honors
- Projects: St. Regis Chicago; Arkansas Museum of Fine Arts; Kresge College Expansion at the University of California, Santa Cruz; Writers Theatre; Richard Gilder Center for Science, Education, and Innovation at the American Museum of Natural History; Northerly Island; Arcus Center for Social Justice Leadership at Kalamazoo College; Tom Lee Park; University of Chicago Campus North Residential Commons; City Hyde Park; Eleanor Boathouse at Park 571; WMS Boathouse at Clark Park; Aqua Tower; Nature Boardwalk at Lincoln Park Zoo; SOS Children's Villages Lavezzorio Community Center; Columbia College Chicago Media Production Center; Bengt Sjostrom Theatre (Starlight Theatre at Rock Valley College; One Hundred

Website
- studiogang.com

Studio Gang is an American architecture and urban design practice with offices in Chicago, New York, San Francisco, and Paris. Founded and led by architect Jeanne Gang, the Studio is known for its material research and experimentation, collaboration across a wide range of disciplines, and focus on sustainability. The firm's works range in scale and typology from the 82-story mixed-use Aqua Tower to the 10,000-square-foot (930 m^{2}) Arcus Center for Social Justice Leadership at Kalamazoo College to the 14-acre (5.7 ha) Nature Boardwalk at Lincoln Park Zoo. Studio Gang has won numerous awards for design excellence, including the 2016 Architizer A+ Firm of the Year Award and the 2013 National Design Award for Architecture from the Cooper Hewitt, Smithsonian Design Museum, as well as various awards from the American Institute of Architects (AIA) and AIA Chicago.

== Background ==
The firm was founded by Jeanne Gang in 1997.

One of the Studio's first built works, the Bengt Sjostrom Starlight Theatre, was completed in 2003, and won praise from critics; the Chinese American Service League Kam Liu Center, finished the following year, garnered the firm additional accolades. Aqua Tower and the Nature Boardwalk at Lincoln Park Zoo, both completed in 2010, significantly increased the Studio's global profile, winning acclaim from architecture critics.

The Studio has played a significant role in reshaping urban landscapes with a focus on ecological restoration and environmental stewardship. Projects include the revitalization of Tom Lee Park in Memphis that reconnects people to the long-neglected riverfront; two boathouses on the Chicago River that opened up access to the river's edge; and the transformation of a former Chicago airfield, Northerly Island, into a public lakefront park and biodiverse habitat.

In 2023, the Studio completed several major cultural and educational projects, including the reimagination of the Arkansas Museum of Fine Arts, an adaptive reuse project, which was praised as a "new architectural landmark"; and the Gilder Center for Science, Education, and Innovation at The American Museum of Natural History in New York, described by the New York Times as "a poetic, joyful, theatrical work of public architecture and a highly sophisticated flight of sculptural fantasy".

The Studio employs more than 140 people as of December 2023.

== Notable works ==
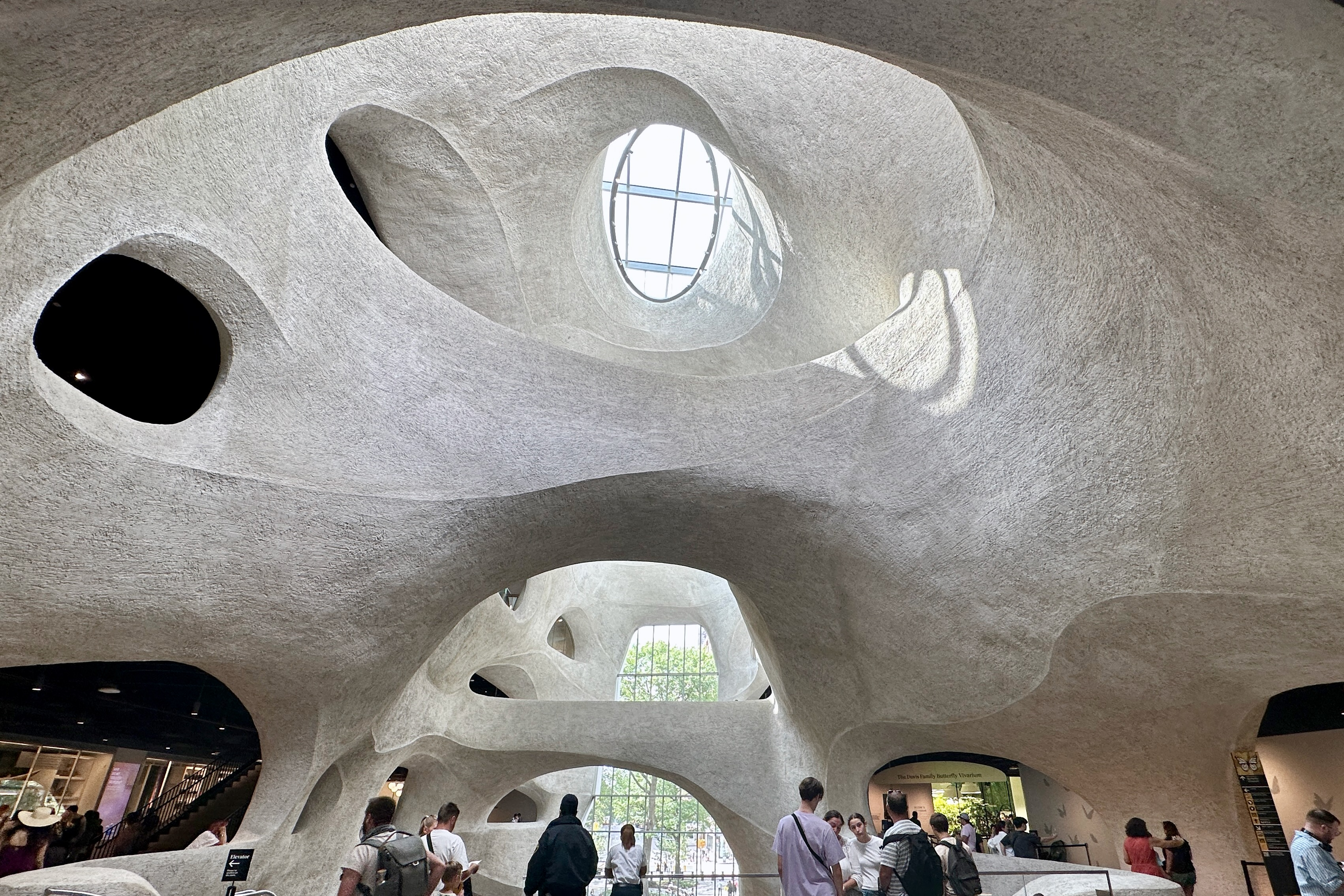
Central atrium of the Richard Gilder Center

=== Richard Gilder Center for Science, Education, and Innovation ===
The $465 million Richard Gilder Center for Science, Education, and Innovation at the American Museum of Natural History opened in May 2023. The 230,000-square-foot (21,000 m^{2}) addition includes six floors above ground, and one below. The Richard Gilder Center welcomes visitors with a new, accessible entrance on Columbus Avenue that connects to central five-story atrium and creates more than 30 connections to the existing museum. The atrium's architecture is informed by natural form-making processes such as the movement of wind and water that shape geological landscapes. To achieve the continuous visual form, the atrium is constructed with shotcrete. The curvilinear façade contrasts with the earlier High Victorian Gothic, Richardson Romanesque and Beaux Arts structures, but its Milford Pink granite cladding is the same stone used on the Museum's west side.

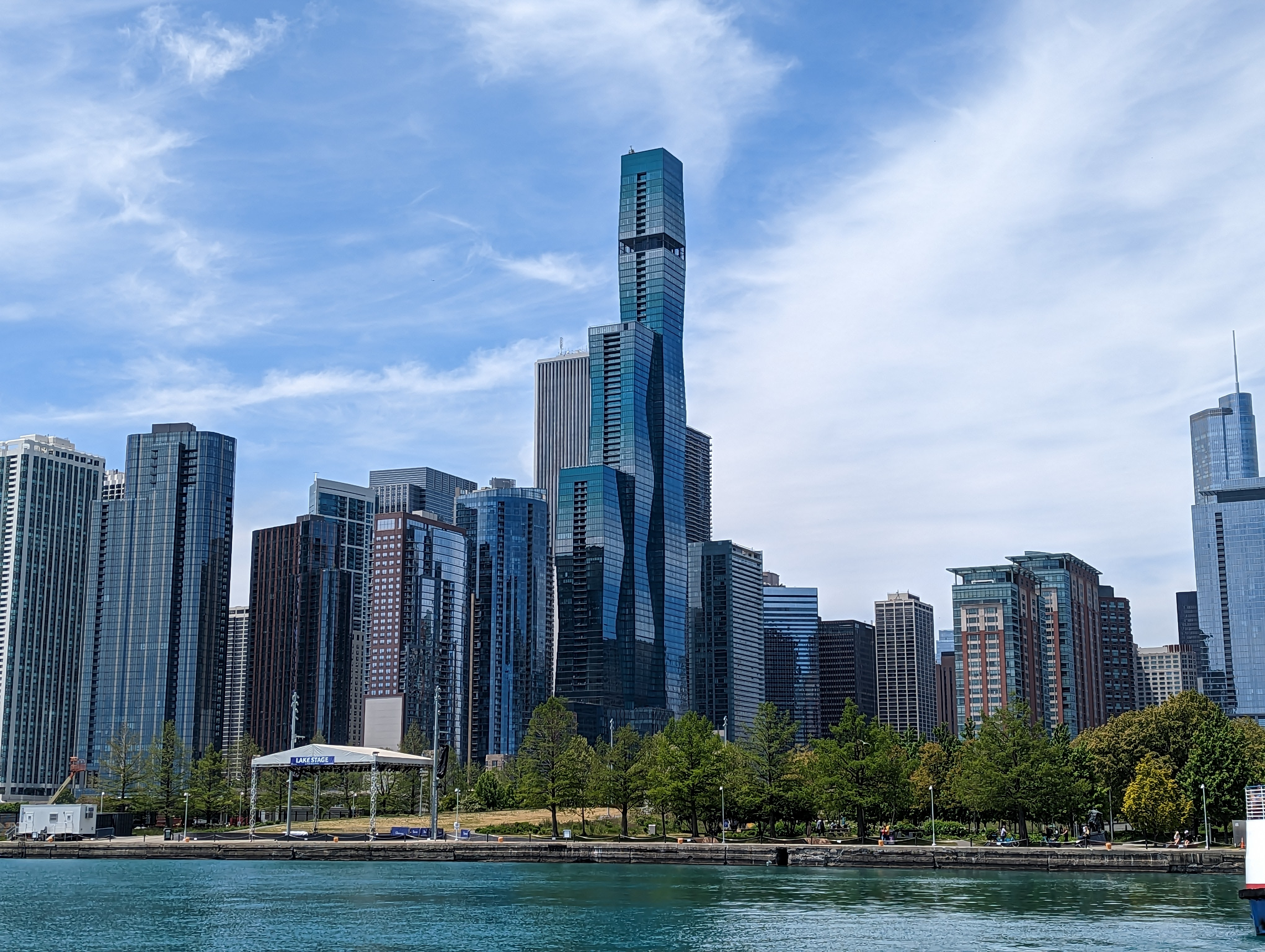
The St. Regis Chicago, designed by Studio Gang.

=== St. Regis Chicago ===
The St. Regis Chicago, formerly Wanda Vista Tower, is a 101-story, 1,198 ft (365 m) supertall skyscraper in Chicago, Illinois. Construction started in August 2016, and was completed in 2020. Upon completion it became the city's third-tallest building, surpassing the Aon Center. It is the tallest structure in the world designed by a woman, and forms a part of the Lakeshore East development and overlooks the Chicago River near Lake Michigan. The building comprises three interconnected volumes of different heights. Truncated pyramids called "frustums" are stacked in an alternating sequence, right-side-up and upside-down, lending the design its flowing rhythm. The towers have 6 different shades of glass. Chicago Tribune architecture critic Blair Kamin praised the tower as "a stirring work of skyline artistry...as if the waters of Lake Michigan had burst upward and transformed themselves into fluid, undulating tiers of glass." The tower has a notably smaller footprint than other supertalls in Chicago with a building height-to-core aspect ratio of 40-to-1.

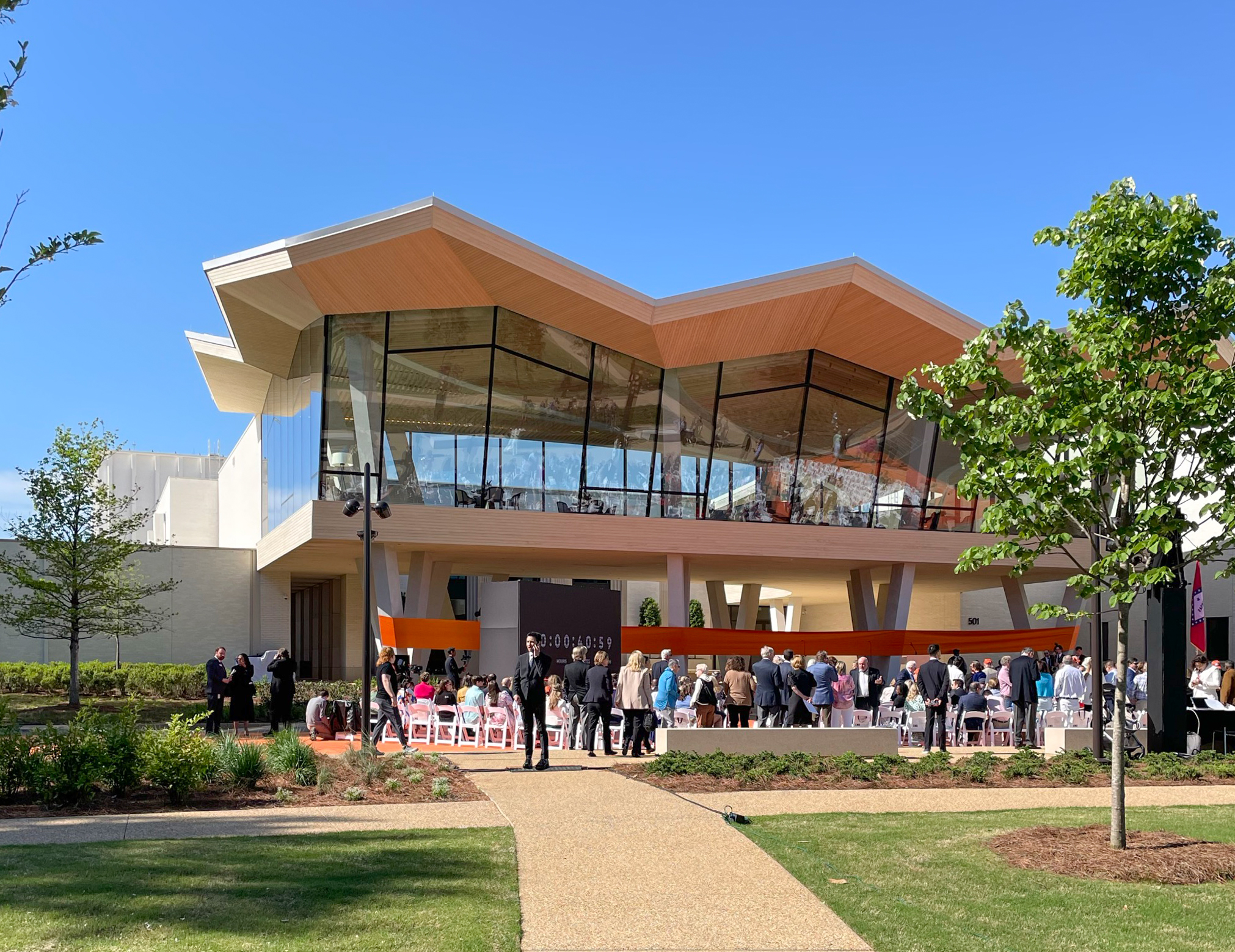
The exterior of Studio Gang's addition to the Arkansas Museum of Fine Arts, featuring the second floor Cultural Living Room.

=== Arkansas Museum of Fine Arts ===
The redevelopment of the Arkansas Museum of Fine Arts (AMFA) involved a comprehensive transformation of the existing building and grounds, resulting in a 133,000-square-foot (12,400 m^{2}) facility. Studio Gang's design reused and restored as many of the existing structures as possible, which spanned multiple eras and architectural styles dating back to 1937. The Studio's design introduced a distinctive central addition that unites the entire complex, and "blossoms" out at the north and south ends to create new entrances and social spaces for the community. The design provides a renewed identity for AMFA, while also establishing visual and physical connections to the surrounding park and the neighborhoods beyond.

== Selected projects ==
=== Education and research ===
Project	Location	Status	Year
The University of Chicago John W. Boyer Center in Paris	Paris, France	Completed	2024
Kresge College Residential Buildings	(United States) Santa Cruz, CA	Completed	2023
Kresge College Academic Center	(United States) Santa Cruz, CA	Completed	2023
Beloit College Powerhouse	(United States) Beloit, WI	Completed	2020
University of Chicago Campus North Residential Commons	(United States) Chicago, IL	Completed	2016
Arcus Center for Social Justice Leadership at Kalamazoo College	(United States) Kalamazoo, MI	Completed	2014
Columbia College Chicago Media Production Center	(United States) Chicago, IL	Completed	2010
One Milestone West	(United States) Boston, MA	Under Construction	2023
David Rubenstein Treehouse	(United States) Boston, MA	Under Construction	2023
Spelman College Center for Innovation & the Arts	(United States) Atlanta, GA	Completed	2025
California College of the Arts Campus Expansion	(United States) San Francisco, CA	Completed	2024

=== Nature, culture, and community ===
Project	Location	Status	Year
Rescue Company 2 (New York City Fire Department)	(United States) New York, NY	Completed	2019
Northerly Island	(United States) Chicago, IL	Ongoing	2017
Richard Gilder Center for Science, Education, and Innovation at the American Museum of Natural History	(United States) New York, NY	Completed	2023
Civic Commons	United States	Completed	2016
Eleanor Boathouse at Park 571	(United States) Chicago, IL	Completed	2016
National Aquarium Strategic Master Plan	(United States) Baltimore, MD	Design concept completed	2016
Writers Theatre	(United States) Glencoe, IL	Completed	2016
PAHC Studio	(United States) Chicago, IL	Completed	2014
WMS Boathouse at Clark Park	(United States) Chicago, IL	Completed	2013
The Conservation Center	(United States) Chicago, IL	Completed	2012
Kaohsiung Maritime Cultural and Pop Music Center	(Taiwan) Kaohsiung	Competition design completed	2011
Blue Wall Center	(United States) Greenville, SC	Design concept completed	2010
Nature Boardwalk at Lincoln Park Zoo	(United States) Chicago, IL	Completed	2010
Taipei Pop Music Center	(Taiwan) Taipei	Competition design completed	2010
Ford Calumet Environmental Center	(United States) Calumet City, IL	Design concept completed	2008
SOS Children's Villages Lavezzorio Community Center	(United States) Chicago, IL	Completed	2008
HafenCity Chicago Square	(Germany) Hamburg	Design concept completed	2006
Chinese American Service League Kam Liu Center	(United States) Chicago, IL	Completed	2004
Bengt Sjostrom Starlight Theatre at Rock Valley College	(United States) Rockford, IL	Completed	2003
Tom Lee Park	(United States) Memphis, TN	Completed	2023
Arkansas Museum of Fine Arts	(United States) Little Rock, AR	Completed	2023
Hudson Valley Shakespeare Festival	(United States) Garrison, NY	In design	2023

=== Towers ===
Project	Location	Status	Year
One Delisle	(Canada) Toronto, ON	Under Construction	2026
St. Regis Chicago	(United States) Chicago, IL	Completed	2022
11 Hoyt	(United States) New York, NY	Completed	2021
One Hundred	(United States) St. Louis, MO	Completed	2020
Solar Carve (40 Tenth Avenue)	(United States) New York, NY	Completed	2019
Solstice on the Park	(United States) Chicago, IL	Completed	2018
MIRA	(United States) San Francisco, CA	Completed	2017
City Hyde Park	(United States) Chicago, IL	Completed	2016
Shoreland	(United States) Chicago, IL	Completed	2014
Recombinant House (Garden in the Machine)	(United States) Cicero, IL	Design concept completed	2012
Aqua Tower	(United States) Chicago, IL	Completed	2010
Vancouver Pair	(Canada) Vancouver, BC	Design concept completed	2010
Hyderabad O2	(India) Hyderabad	Design concept completed	2008
HafenCity Crane Tower	(Germany) Hamburg	Design concept completed	2006
Zhong Bang Village	(China) Shanghai	Competition design completed	2003
Q Residences	(Netherlands) Amsterdam	Completed	2022

=== Exhibitions ===
Project	Location	Status	Year
Arkansas Museum of Fine Arts	(United States) Little Rock, AR	Completed	2023
Dimensions of Discovery: Environments for Learning	Paris, France	Completed	2023
Studio Gang Mock-Ups	(United States) Chicago, IL	Completed	2022
Good News: Women in Architecture	Rome, Italy	Completed	2021
A Different Future in the Making	(United States) Chicago, IL	Completed	2020
Baleinopolis: The Secret Societies of Cetaceans	Paris, France	Completed	2019
Stage Buoys	(United States) Chicago, IL	Completed	2017
Hive	(United States) Washington, D.C.	Completed	2017
Working in America	(United States) Chicago, IL	Completed	2016
Thinning Ice at Design Miami	(United States) Miami, FL	Completed	2014
Changes of Phase for Thodos Dance Chicago	(United States) Chicago, IL	Completed	2014
EXPO Chicago	(United States) Chicago, IL	Completed	2012 –2014
Building: Inside Studio Gang Architects at the Art Institute of Chicago	(United States) Chicago, IL	Completed	2012 –2013
Foreclosed: Rehousing the American Dream at the Museum of Modern Art	(United States) New York, NY	Completed	2012
Baseball in the City at the Art Institute of Chicago	(United States) Chicago, IL	Completed	2004
Marble Curtain at the National Building Museum	(United States) Washington, D.C.	Completed	2003

=== Planning ===
Project	Location	Status	Year
Enterprise Research Campus Plan	(United States) Boston, MA	Completed	2022
Kresge College Expansion at the University of California, Santa Cruz	(United States) Santa Cruz, CA	Completed	2019
Neighborhood Activation to Increase Public Safety through Community-Empowered Design and Planning	(United States) Chicago, IL	Completed	2021
River Edge Ideas Lab	(United States) Chicago, IL	Completed	2017
Mayor's Office of Criminal Justice Neighborhood Activation Study	(United States) New York, NY	Completed	2018
Memphis Riverfront Concept	(United States) Memphis, TN	Completed	2017
Neighborhood Schools Reuse Concept	(United States) Memphis, TN	Completed	2018
Port District Planning Study	(United States) Milwaukee, WI	Completed	2015
Civic Commons Philadelphia	(United States) Philadelphia, PA	Completed	2016

== Selected awards ==
- 11 Hoyt Receives Honor at 2023 AIA NY Design Awards
- Institute Honor Award, Interior Architecture, AIA Awards, 2017 / Writers Theatre
- Daniel Burnham Award for Master Planning, AIA Illinois, 2016 / Technical team for Positioning Pullman
- Divine Detail Award, Design Excellence Awards, AIA Chicago, 2016 / Writers Theatre
- Interior Architecture Award, Design Excellence Awards, AIA Chicago, 2016 / Writers Theatre
- Distinguished Building Citation of Merit, Design Excellence Awards, AIA Chicago, 2016 / Writers Theatre
- Divine Detail Award, Design Excellence Awards, AIA Chicago, 2016 / City Hyde Park
- Distinguished Building Citation of Merit, Design Excellence Awards, AIA Chicago, 2016 / City Hyde Park
- Institute Honor Award, Architecture, AIA Awards, 2016 / WMS Boathouse at Clark Park
- Architizer A+ Firm of the Year, 2016
- Award for Excellence in Design, Thirty-third Annual Design Awards, Public Design Commission, New York, 2015 / Rescue Company 2
- Distinguished Building Award, Design Excellence Awards, AIA Chicago, 2015 / Arcus Center for Social Justice Leadership
- Divine Detail Award, Design Excellence Awards, AIA Chicago, 2015 / Arcus Center for Social Justice Leadership
- Honor Award, AIA Illinois, 2015 / Northerly Island
- Distinguished Building Citation of Merit, Design Excellence Awards, AIA Chicago, 2014 / WMS Boathouse at Clark Park
- National Design Award, Cooper Hewitt, Smithsonian Design Museum
- Holcim Awards for Sustainable Construction Acknowledgement Prize North America, 2011, for the Ford Calumet Environmental Center
- Distinguished Building Honor Award, AIA Chicago, 2011, for the Nature Boardwalk, Education Pavilion and South Pond Transformation at Lincoln Park Zoo
- Most Compassionate Architectural Firm, People for the Ethical Treatment of Animals (PETA), 2009
- Skyscraper of the Year Award, Emporis, 2009, for the Aqua Tower
- Emerging Visions Award, AIA Chicago, 2000 & 2006
- Neighborhood Development Award, 3rd place, Richard H. Driehaus Foundation, 2005, for the Chinese American Service League
