= Jeanne Gang =

American architect

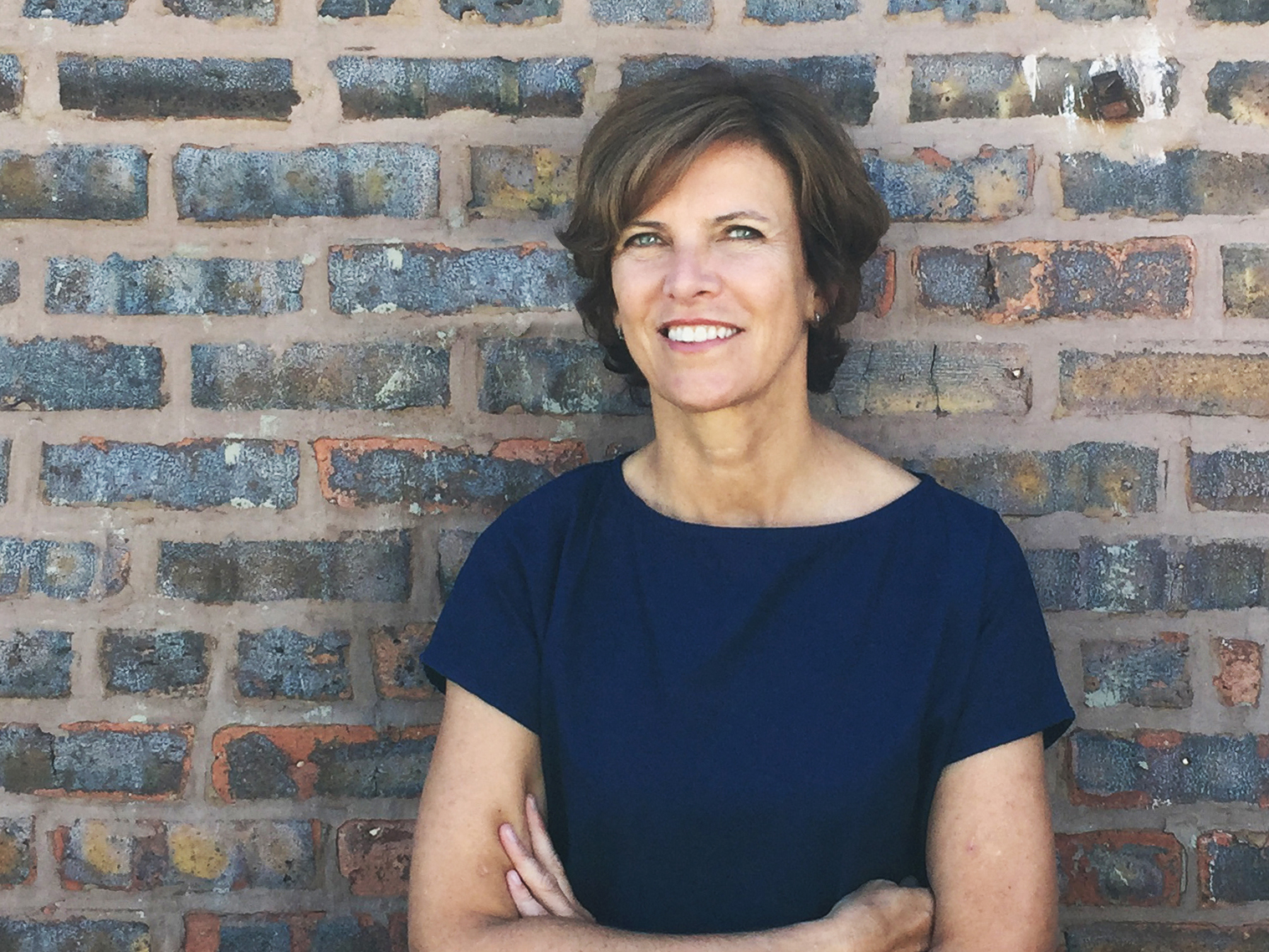
- Born: March 19, 1964 (age 62); Belvidere, Illinois
- Education: University of Illinois (B.S.), Harvard University Graduate School of Design (M.Arch.)
- Occupation: Architect
- Awards: 2011 MacArthur Fellow, 2013 National Design Award (Cooper Hewitt, Smithsonian Design Museum), 2017 Louis I. Kahn Memorial Award (Philadelphia Center for Architecture)
- Buildings: Aqua, St. Regis Chicago, Richard Gilder Center at The American Museum of Natural History, Tom Lee Park, Arkansas Museum of Fine Arts, One Hundred Above the Park, Kresge College, at the University of California, Santa Cruz

Jeanne Gang (born March 19, 1964) is an American architect and the founder and leader of Studio Gang (established in 1997), an architecture and urban design practice with offices in Chicago, New York, San Francisco, and Paris. She is known for apartment towers, first coming to wide attention with the Aqua Tower, which at the time of its completion was the tallest building in the world designed by a woman and has since been surpassed by the nearby St. Regis Chicago, also designed by Gang. She is also known for designing with an emphasis on sustainability and on social justice, and has designed a number of academic and public buildings.

== Early life and education ==
Gang was born in Belvidere, Illinois, where her father was the engineer for Boone County. She graduated from Belvidere High School in 1982, then earned a Bachelor of Science in Architecture from the University of Illinois in 1986; during her third year, she studied in Versailles, France at the École nationale supérieure d'architecture de Versailles. In 1993 she earned a Master of Architecture with Distinction from the Harvard Graduate School of Design.

In 1989, Gang was awarded an Ambassadorial Scholarship from the Rotary Foundation to study at ETH Zurich (Swiss Federal Institute of Technology).

== Career ==
Gang worked with OMA/Rem Koolhaas in Rotterdam and Booth Hansen in Chicago before establishing Studio Gang Architects in Chicago in 1997.

Gang has extensive built work in the Chicago area, beginning with the Starlight Theatre at Rock Valley College in Rockford, Illinois, a 1997 commission. In 2016, the Chicago Tribune named her one of its Chicagoans of the Year, and the following year Surface called her one of the most prominent Chicago architects of her generation. She was first widely recognized for the Aqua Tower (2010), her first skyscraper, which at the time of its completion was the tallest building in the world designed by a woman. The nearby St. Regis Chicago, also of her design, has since taken the title. She has also designed several academic buildings in the region, boathouses on the Chicago River, and the Nature Boardwalk at Lincoln Park Zoo. In 2019, the team led by Gang won the international competition to design the new Global Terminal at O'Hare International Airport.

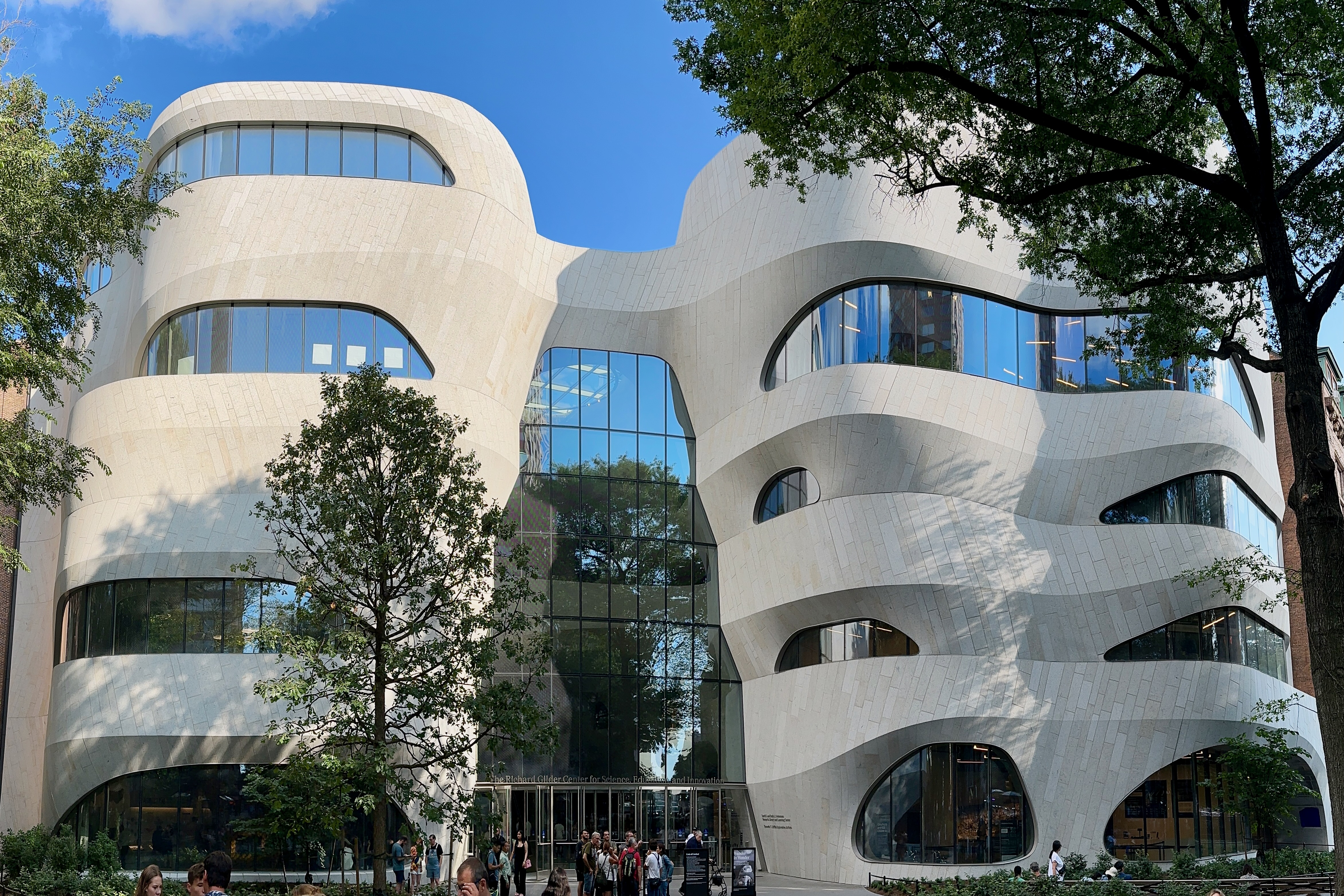
Richard Gilder Center at the American Museum of Natural History

She has also completed several projects in New York City, including the Richard Gilder Center at the American Museum of Natural History Other major projects in the United States include the renovation and expansion of the Arkansas Museum of Fine Arts in Little Rock, the expansion of Kresge College at the University of California, Santa Cruz, the new campus for California College of the Arts in San Francisco, and the Center for Arts & Innovation at Spelman College in Atlanta.

Internationally, Studio Gang was selected in 2016 to design the new United States Embassy in Brasília, Brazil. The University of Chicago Center in Paris opened in 2024; Q Residences in Amsterdam, the firm's first project in Europe, was completed in 2022. Studio Gang's work has been widely honored, published, and exhibited.

Gang prioritizes ecologically sensitive design and also social responsibility. Her Arcus Center for Social Justice Leadership at Kalamazoo College is the first building designed specifically for social justice and uses cordwood masonry, which she found "an old-school hippie" to teach; and some of her community projects are low-budget, such as the SOS Children's Villages Lavezzorio Community Center, which used donated concrete. Among Studio Gang's planning projects is a guide to re-envisioning and improving the Civic Commons published in 2016.

Gang is a Professor in Practice of Architecture at the Harvard Graduate School of Design, where she has taught since 2011 and in 2017 was the John Portman Design Critic in Architecture. She has also been a visiting studio critic at the Columbia Graduate School of Architecture, Planning and Preservation, the Cullinan Visiting Professor at the Rice University School of Architecture, a visiting lecturer at the Princeton University School of Architecture, the Louis I. Kahn Junior Visiting Professor at the Yale University School of Architecture, and a studio critic at the Illinois Institute of Technology. She also lectures frequently. In 2016, she presented at the TED Women conference. On May 11, 2024, she delivered the commencement speech at the University of Illinois at Urbana-Champaign.

== Publications ==
In 2024, Gang published The Art of Architectural Grafting, which presents a 10-point program for adaptive reuse on the analogy of horticultural grafting. She co-edited Building: Inside Studio Gang (2012), a catalogue to accompany Studio Gang's solo exhibition at Art Institute of Chicago. In 2011, Studio Gang published Reverse Effect: Renewing Chicago's Waterways, an advocacy publication to spur the revival of the Chicago River.

== Awards ==
Gang was elected a Fellow of the American Institute of Architects in 2009, became an Honorary Fellow of the Royal Architectural Institute of Canada in 2017, and also in 2017 was elected to the American Academy of Arts and Sciences. In 2018, she was elected an International Fellow of the Royal Institute of British Architects.

Gang received the Academy Award in Architecture of the American Academy of Arts and Letters in 2006 She was a 2011 MacArthur Fellow, the fourth architect to be selected, and was elected into the National Academy of Design in 2012. In 2013, she received the Jesse L. Rosenberger Medal by the University of Chicago, and she and Studio Gang were awarded the National Design Award for Architecture by the Cooper Hewitt, Smithsonian Design Museum. In 2014, she was one of five recipients in the inaugural year of the Architectural Record Women in Architecture awards. In 2015, she was awarded the Légion d'Honnaire by France. Gang was named the 2016 Architect of the Year by The Architectural Review, which cited the Arcus Center in particular. In 2017, she won the Public Humanities Award of the Illinois Humanities Council and the Marcus Prize for Architecture, and received the Louis I. Kahn Memorial Award of the Philadelphia Center for Architecture. In 2019, she was included in Time magazine's list of the 100 most influentual people. In 2022, she won the ULI Prize for Visionaries in Urban Development and was the first woman to receive the Charlotte Perriand Award, which recognizes architects whose work enhances the quality of life through design. Among specific buildings, the Aqua Tower was awarded a 2008 American Architecture Award by the Chicago Athenaeum, the 2009 Emporis Skyscraper Award, an Award of Excellence at the 2010 CTBUH Skyscraper Awards, and the 2011 Prix d'Excellence International Design Award of the International Real Estate Federation, and was a finalist for the 2010 International High-Rise Award; Mira won the jury award for unbuilt multi-unit residential buildings at the 2020 Architizer A+ Awards and four awards of excellence at the 2021 CTBUH Tall + Urban Innovation conference; and St. Regis Chicago won Best Tall Building by Height: 300–399 meters and two awards of excellence at the 2022 CTBUH Skyscraper Awards and a People's Choice Award and a certificate of merit from the Chicago chapter of the American Institute of Architects in 2023 (Studio Gang's design for the Arkansas Museum of Fine Arts won an honor award at the same event).

She has received honorary doctorates from the School of the Art Institute of Chicago, Columbia College Chicago, and the University of Illinois at Urbana–Champaign.

== Personal life ==
Gang is married to Mark Schendel.

== Projects ==
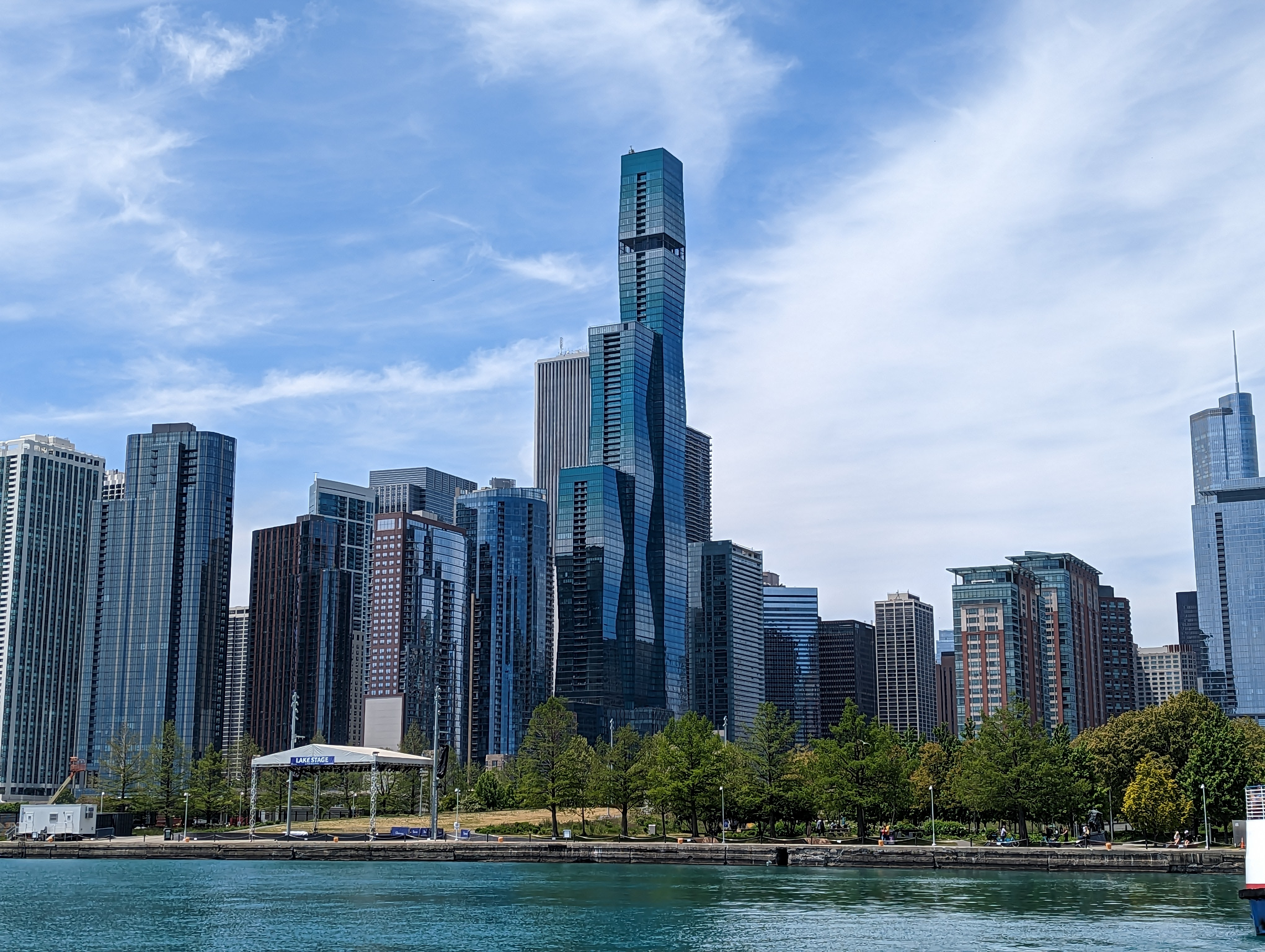
St. Regis Chicago, the tallest building in the world designed by a woman

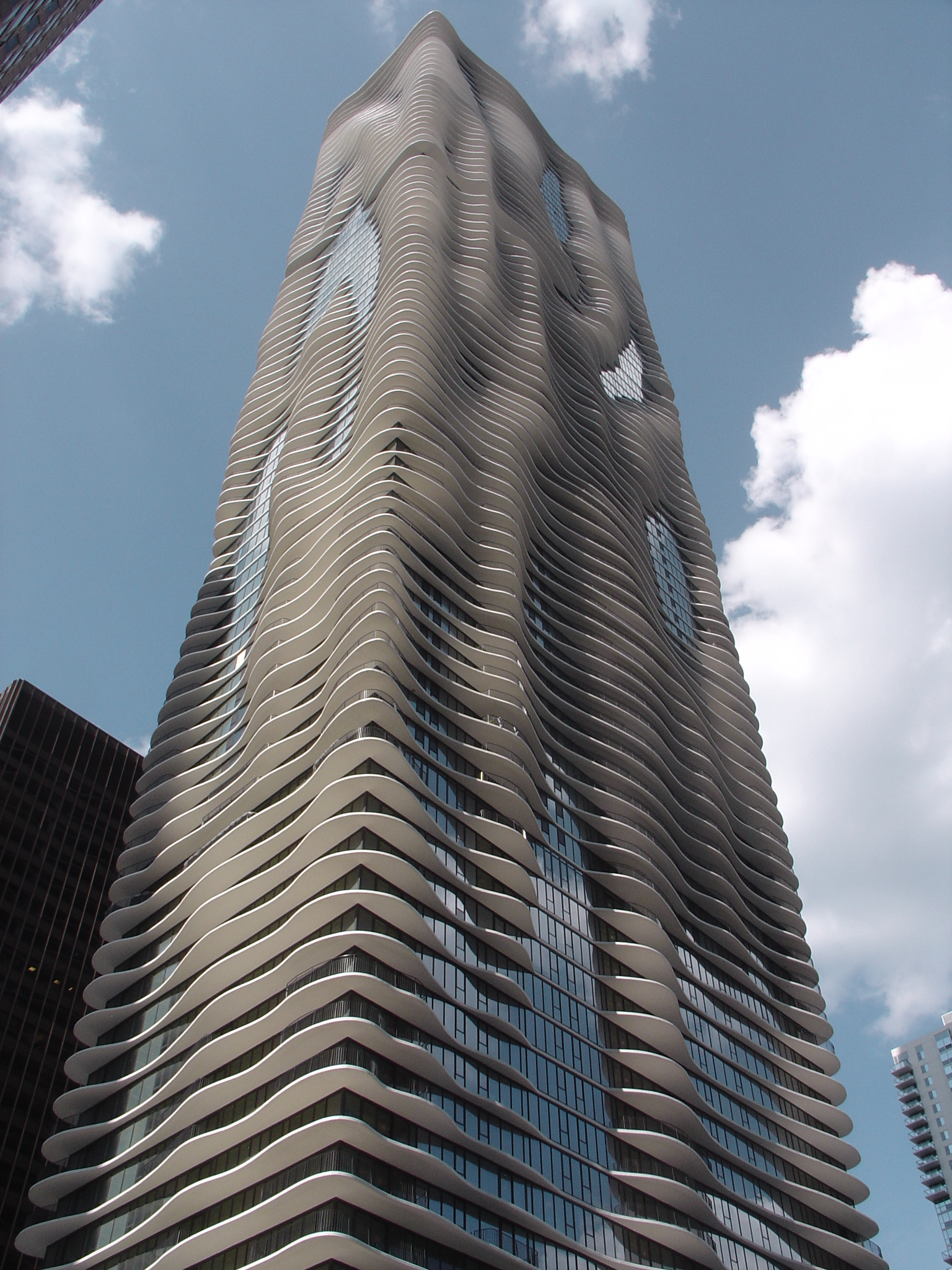
Aqua Tower, previously the world's tallest female-designed building

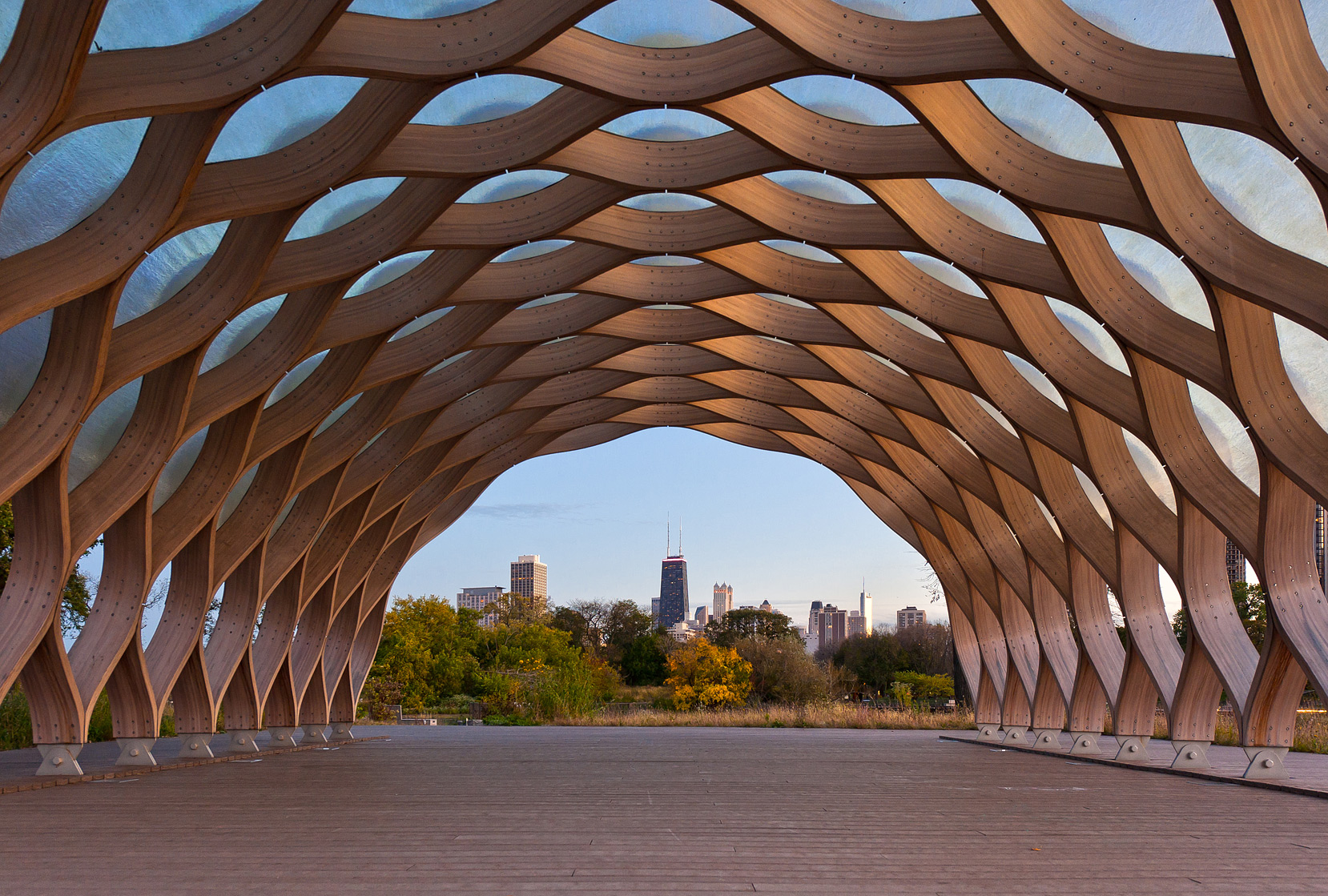
Nature Boardwalk at the Lincoln Park Zoo

=== Education and research ===
Project	Location	Status	Year
The University of Chicago Center in Paris	Paris, France		2022
Kresge College Residential Buildings, University of California, Santa Cruz	Santa Cruz, California		2023
Kresge College Academic Center, University of California, Santa Cruz	Santa Cruz, California		2023
Beloit College Powerhouse	Beloit, Wisconsin		2020
University of Chicago Campus North Residential Commons	Chicago, Illinois		2016
Arcus Center for Social Justice Leadership at Kalamazoo College	Kalamazoo, Michigan		2014
Columbia College Chicago Media Production Center	Chicago		2010
One Milestone West, Harvard University Enterprise Research Campus	Allston, Boston, Massachusetts	Under construction	2023
David Rubenstein Treehouse, Harvard University	Allston, Boston	Under construction	2023
Spelman College Center for Innovation & the Arts	Atlanta, Georgia		2024
California College of the Arts	San Francisco, California	Two of three buildings completed	2023

=== Nature, culture, and community ===
Project	Location	Status	Year
Rescue Company 2 (New York City Fire Department)	New York City		2019
Northerly Island	Chicago, Illinois	Ongoing	2017
Richard Gilder Center for Science, Education, and Innovation at the American Museum of Natural History	New York City		2023
Eleanor Boathouse at Park 571	Chicago		2016
National Aquarium Strategic Master Plan	Baltimore, Maryland	Design concept completed	2016
Writers Theatre	Glencoe, Illinois		2016
PAHC Studio	Chicago		2014
WMS Boathouse at Clark Park	Chicago		2013
The Conservation Center	Chicago		2012
Kaohsiung Maritime Cultural and Pop Music Center	Kaohsiung, Republic of China	Competition design completed	2011
Blue Wall Center	Greenville, South Carolina	Design concept completed	2010
Nature Boardwalk at Lincoln Park Zoo	Chicago		2010
Taipei Pop Music Center	Taipei, Republic of China	Competition design completed	2010
SOS Children's Villages Lavezzorio Community Center	Chicago		2008
Chinese American Service League Kam Liu Center	Chicago		2004
Bengt Sjostrom Starlight Theatre at Rock Valley College	Rockford, Illinois		2003
Tom Lee Park	Memphis, Tennessee		2023
Arkansas Museum of Fine Arts	Little Rock, Arkansas		2023
Hudson Valley Shakespeare Festival	Garrison, New York	Under construction	2023
O'Hare Global Terminal	Chicago	In design	2024

=== Towers ===
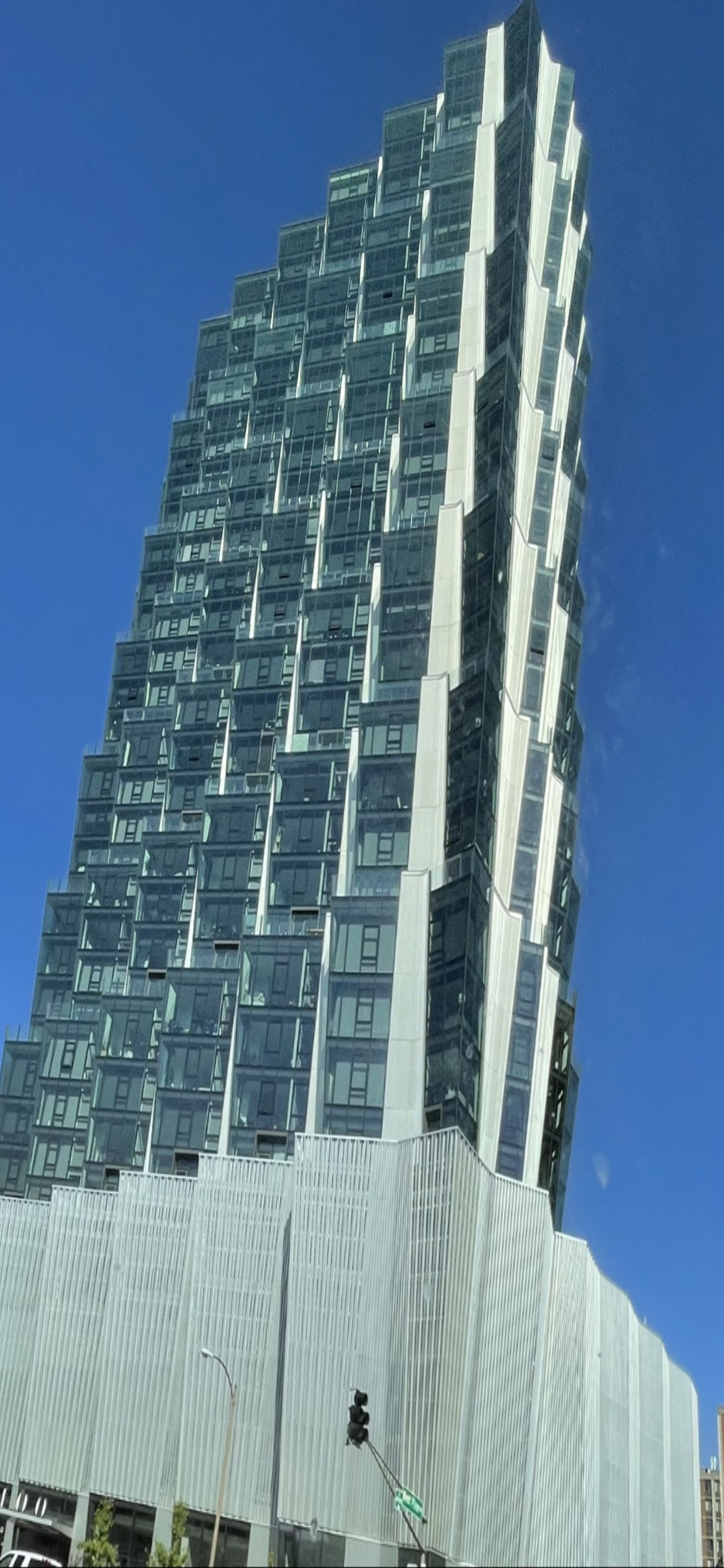
One Hundred Above the Park, St. Louis, Missouri

Project	Location	Status	Year
One Delisle	Toronto, Ontario, Canada	Pre-construction	2026
St. Regis Chicago	Chicago, Illinois		2022
11 Hoyt	New York City		2021
One Hundred Above the Park	St. Louis, Missouri		2020
Solar Carve (40 Tenth Avenue)	New York City		2019
Solstice on the Park	Chicago		2018
Mira	San Francisco, California		2017
City Hyde Park	Chicago		2016
Shoreland	Chicago		2014
Recombinant House (Garden in the Machine)	Cicero, Illinois	Design concept completed	2012
Aqua Tower	Chicago		2010
Vancouver Pair	Vancouver, British Columbia, Canada	Design concept completed	2010
Hyderabad O2	Hyderabad, India	Design concept completed	2008
Zhong Bang Village	Shanghai, China	Competition design	2003
Q Residences	Amsterdam, Netherlands		2022

=== Planning ===
Project	Location	Status	Year
Neighborhood Activation to Increase Public Safety through Community-Empowered Design and Planning	Chicago, Illinois		2021
River Edge Ideas Lab	Chicago		2017
Mayor's Office of Criminal Justice Neighborhood Activation Study	New York City		2018
Neighborhood Schools Reuse Concept	Memphis, Tennessee		2018
Civic Commons	United States		2016
Port District Planning Study	Milwaukee, Wisconsin	Design proposals	2015
HafenCity	Hamburg, Germany	Design proposals	2006

=== Exhibitions ===
Project	Location	Institution	Year
Dimensions of Discovery: Environments for Learning	Paris, France	Galerie Archilib	2023
Studio Gang Mock-Ups	Chicago, Illinois		2022
Good News: Women in Architecture	Rome, Italy	Maxxi Museum	2021
A Different Future in the Making	Chicago		2020
Baleinopolis: The Secret Societies of Cetaceans	Paris, France	Dorée Tropical Aquarium	2019
Stage Buoys	Chicago	Chicago Architecture Biennial	2017
Hive	Washington, D.C.	National Building Museum	2017
Working in America	Chicago		2016
Thinning Ice	Miami, Florida	Design Miami	2014
Changes of Phase	Chicago	Thodos Dance Chicago	2014
EXPO Chicago	Chicago		2012 –2014
Building: Inside Studio Gang Architects	Chicago	Art Institute of Chicago	2012–2013
Foreclosed: Rehousing the American Dream at the Museum of Modern Art	New York City	Museum of Modern Art	2012
Baseball in the City	Chicago	Art Institute of Chicago	2004
Marble Curtain	Washington, D.C.	Masonry Variations, National Building Museum	2003–2004

== External links and additional reading ==
- Studio Gang official website
- Jeanne Gang, Harvard Graduate School of Design
- Kate Sullivan (January 7, 2022). "Jeanne Gang – Architect. Founder of Studio Gang". To Dine For with Kate Sullivan. Season 4. Episode 402. PBS. WTTW.
- Joann Gonchar (January 30, 2017). "Interview with Jeanne Gang". Architectural Record.
- Reveal Princeton Architectural Press: 2011 ISBN 978-1-56898-993-8
- Studio Gang: Architecture, Phaidon Press: 2020 ISBN 978-1-83866-054-3
