= James McHugh Construction Co =

American construction firm

James McHugh Construction Co.
- Type: Private
- Industry: General Contracting
- Founded: 1897
- Founder: James D. McHugh
- Headquarters: Chicago, United States
- Key people: Patricia H. McHugh (Chairman) Michael J. Meagher (President)
- Number of employees: 1,000
- Website: http://www.mchugh.com

James McHugh Construction Co. is an American construction management and structural engineering firm based in Chicago, Illinois. As of 2019, McHugh was the 160th-largest contractor in the United States as tabulated by Engineering News-Record. McHugh is best known for its high-rise work in Chicago, including the St. Regis Chicago, NEMA, Aqua, Water Tower Place, Marina City, and Trump International Hotel and Tower.

== History ==
McHugh was founded in 1897 by James D. McHugh, an Irish bricklayer from the South Side of Chicago. By the mid-1920s, McHugh had established itself as a general contractor specializing in elaborate masonry work.

During the Great Depression, McHugh continued to grow through projects funded by the Public Works Administration. McHugh began sending crews across the country for heavy construction work, including water treatment systems and transportation tunnels. The postwar era of the 1940s and 1950s saw a resurgence of the market for institutional facilities and public works structures as Chicago struggled to keep pace with its booming population. In response to this demand, McHugh built additions to Cook County Hospital and a residence hall for Rush-Presbyterian St. Luke's Medical Center in 1955.

During the 1950s, McHugh continued to centralize and grow in Chicago. Marina City was one of their next large projects. For this project, McHugh pioneered the use of fiberglass concrete forms that are still used for curved concrete construction. The project, the world's tallest reinforced concrete structure at the time, also marked the first use of the climbing crane, which paved the way for speedier, more efficient high-rise construction.

When a change in ownership occurred in the mid-1970s, the McHughs chose to sell a portion of the company to the employees, which predated the employee stock option trend by decades. Employees still own part of the company today.

After the passing of her father in August 2016, the founder's great-granddaughter, Patty McHugh, became chairwoman of the firm.

=== Expansion ===
Though many projects are located in the Chicago area today, McHugh was the first American contractor to open an office in Moscow after the revolutions of 1989 and today has projects around the country. Between 1991 and 1999, McHugh had built for local and non-Russian clients including Dialog Bank, ABC News, Boeing and Morgan Stanley. In recent years, in addition to Chicago, the company has also completed several projects around the country in locations including Nashville, St Louis, Minneapolis, and South Florida.

== Notable projects ==
McHugh has constructed a variety of notable projects, largely concentrated in the Chicago metropolitan area:

- St. Regis Chicago – third-tallest building in Chicago
- NEMA – tenth-tallest building in Chicago
- Aqua – twelfth-tallest building in Chicago
- Park Tower – fifteenth-tallest building in Chicago
- United Center master plan
- Fifth Third Arena
- Goodman Theatre
- Civic Opera House renovation
- McCormick Place expansion
- Chicago Board of Trade expansion
- Arlington Park
- Peggy Notebaert Nature Museum
- Virgin Hotels Chicago
- Advocate Center, a training facility for the Chicago Bulls
- The Blackstone Hotel renovation
