= MIRA (building) =

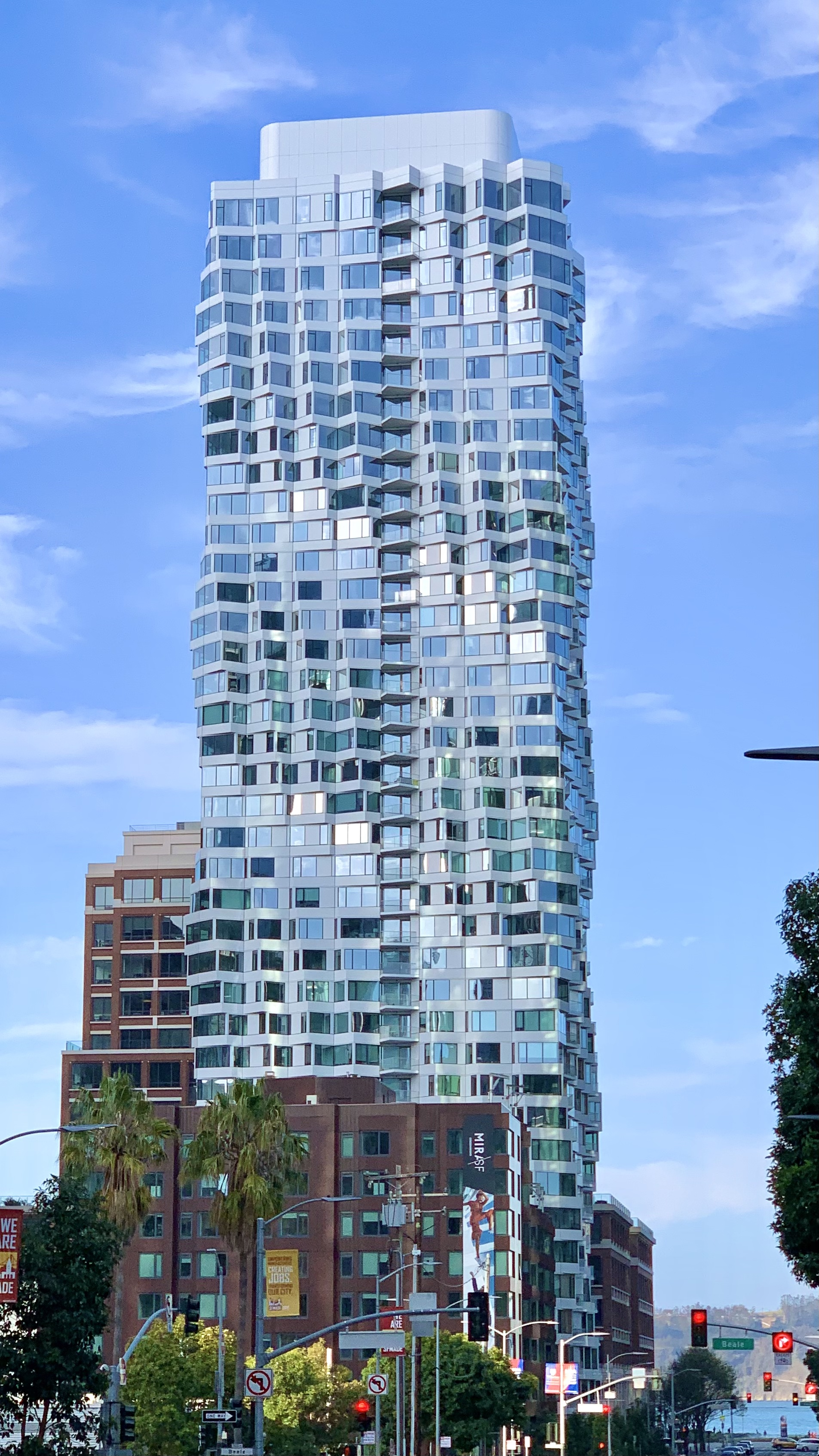
- In March 2021

- Location within San Francisco
- Former names: Folsom Bay Tower

General information
- Status: Completed
- Type: Residential condominiums
- Location: 280 Spear Street; San Francisco, California
- Coordinates: 37.79°N 122.3918°W
- Construction started: 2017
- Completed: 2020
- Owner: Tishman Speyer (50%); Shanghai Longlife Business Group (50%)

Height
- Architectural: 422 ft (129 m)
- Roof: 398 ft (121 m)

Technical details
- Floor count: 39

Design and construction
- Architect: Studio Gang Architects
- Developer: Tishman Speyer
- Main contractor: Lendlease

Other information
- Number of units: 391

MIRA (originally called Folsom Bay Tower) is a 39-story, 422-foot (129 m) residential skyscraper at 280 Spear Street in San Francisco, California.

The tower is located on Block 1 of the San Francisco Transbay development plan at the northwest corner of Folsom and Spear Streets, near the Embarcadero. Developed by Tishman Speyer, the project contains 392 condominiums, with 156 designated below-market-rate, and was completed in 2020. In addition to the tower, the project includes an eight-story podium at Folsom and Main and a four-story row of townhomes along Clementina Street. The project is located across the street from two other Tishman Speyer properties, The Infinity and LUMINA.

== History ==
The rippled tower design by architect Jeanne Gang of Studio Gang Architects was first unveiled in 2014. The parcel is located on former right-of-way of the now-demolished Embarcadero Freeway. Originally zoned for 300 feet (91 m), the parcel was upzoned to 400 feet (120 m) when the developer agreed to increase the ratio of affordable housing from 33% to 40%. The parcel was officially sold to the developer in 2016. Shanghai Longlife Business Group Co. Ltd. acquired a 50% stake in the project in March 2017. Construction started in April 2017.

In October 2018, after the first 32 of 392 condos in the development were made available for pre-sales, and three dozen buyers submitted bids within three days, starting under $1 million. Upper units ranged up to $3 million.

The building topped out in May 2019, at which point its white facade appeared mostly complete. Construction was announced finished in November 2019.

40% of the 392 condos are designated to be sold below market rate. The units at the top of Mira tower start around $5 million.

== Features ==
Due to the spiraling design, each unit has slightly different layout and bay windows. The design also relied on facade consultant Heintges and fabricator Permasteelisa. The building is built with spiral tiers. In December 2019, Curbed named it one of the 10 most important buildings of the prior decade, saying "reaching 400 vertical feet, the spiraling ribbons of glass and Italian white panels are made possible by a sophisticated curtain wall that guides a coiling pattern of modern bay windows, a motif adopted from San Francisco’s architectural heritage."

The San Francisco Business Journal said in 2018 that amenities would include "a courtyard, rooftop deck, private dining room, club lounge, gym, children’s playroom, business and conference center, dog-washing station, valet parking, electric vehicle charging stations and bike parking." It also has "dog washing station, valet parking for 340 cars with electric vehicle charging stations, parking for 150 bicycles, and over 10,000 square feet of retail at street level."

MIRA is strategically located near key transportation hubs, such as the Salesforce Transit Center, BART, MUNI and SF Ferry services.

== See also ==
- List of tallest buildings in San Francisco
