= One Hundred Above the Park =

Apartment building in St. Louis, United States

One Hundred
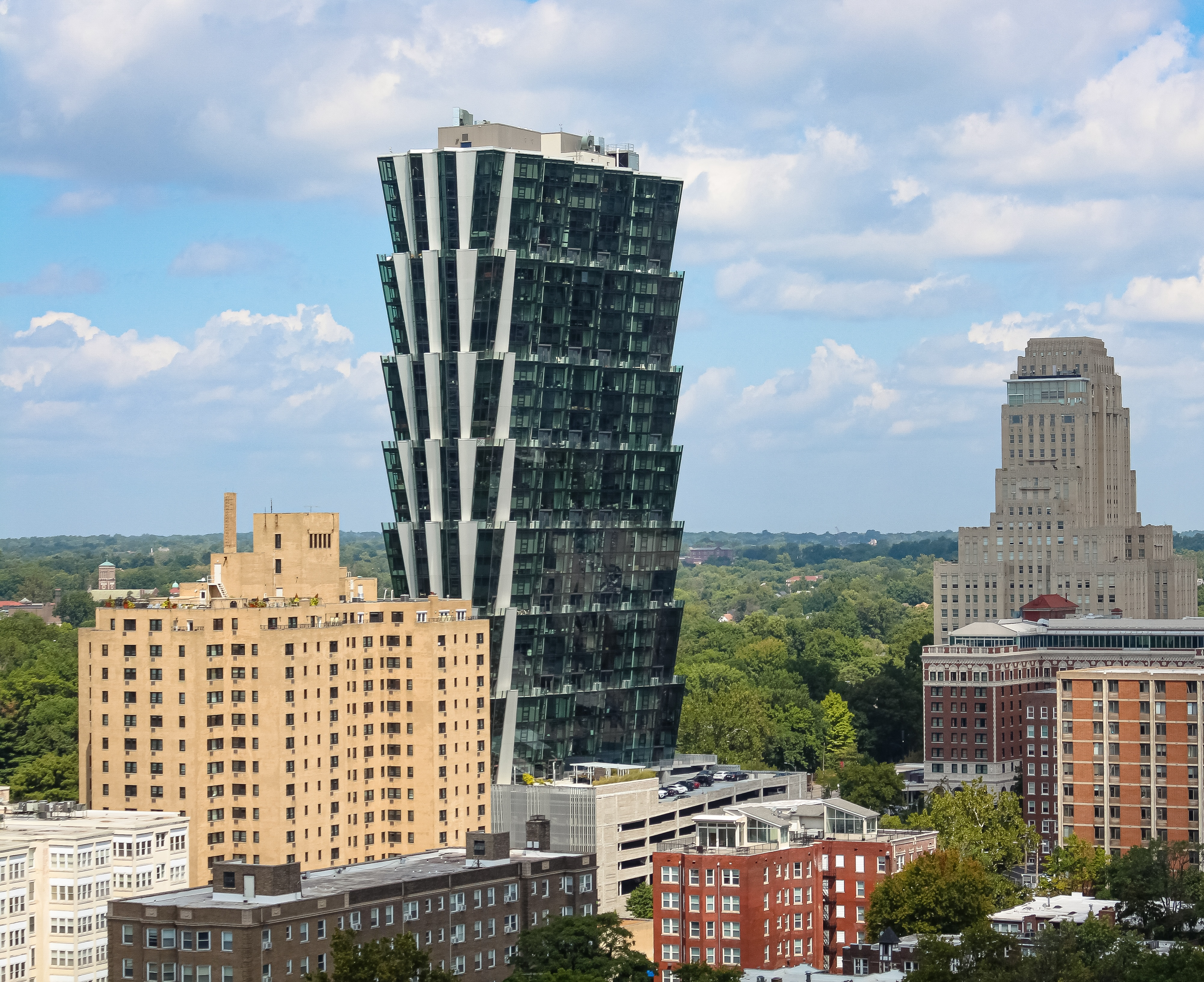
- One Hundred seen in 2022

- Location within St. Louis Location within Missouri
- Alternative names: 100 Above the Park, One Hundred Luxury Apartments

General information
- Status: Completed
- Type: Residential
- Architectural style: Modernism
- Location: 100 N Kingshighway; St. Louis, Missouri, United States of America
- Coordinates: 38.64271°N 90.26464°W
- Groundbreaking: February 27, 2018
- Construction started: 2018
- Completed: 2020
- Cost: $130 million USD

Height
- Architectural: 385 ft (117 m)

Technical details
- Floor count: 36
- Floor area: 540,369 square feet (50,201.9 m^{2})
- Lifts/elevators: 4

Design and construction
- Architect: Studio Gang Architects
- Developer: Mac Properties

Other information
- Number of units: 316
- Public transit: MetroBus

Website
- https://liveat100.com/

One Hundred is an apartment tower located at 100 N Kingshighway Blvd. in the Central West End neighborhood of St. Louis, Missouri, in the United States. It was designed by Studio Gang Architects. Construction topped out in spring 2020.

== Design ==
One Hundred contains 316 apartment units and 355 parking spaces within its 36 stories of elevation space. The building also includes a retail space on the ground floor. The building's splayed windows were designed to admit natural light to the units and fit into an overall façade of angled glass. Lead architect Jeanne Gang told a reporter that the goal of developer Mac Properties had been to create a repetitive arrangement of corner units. Attributes of the apartments include LED lighting and floor-to-ceiling windows. The project was financed so as to generate rents of $3 USD per square foot (0.09 square meters) per month. Upon seeing design elevations in 2016, skeptics told the St. Louis Post-Dispatch that the building would look like "stacked cups" or a "magazine rack."

== Amenities ==
Many of the building's amenities are located on the seventh floor, known as the 'amenity floor,' including an outdoor pool, game room, fitness training equipment, and a conference room.
