= Aqua (Chicago) =

Skyscraper in Chicago, Illinois

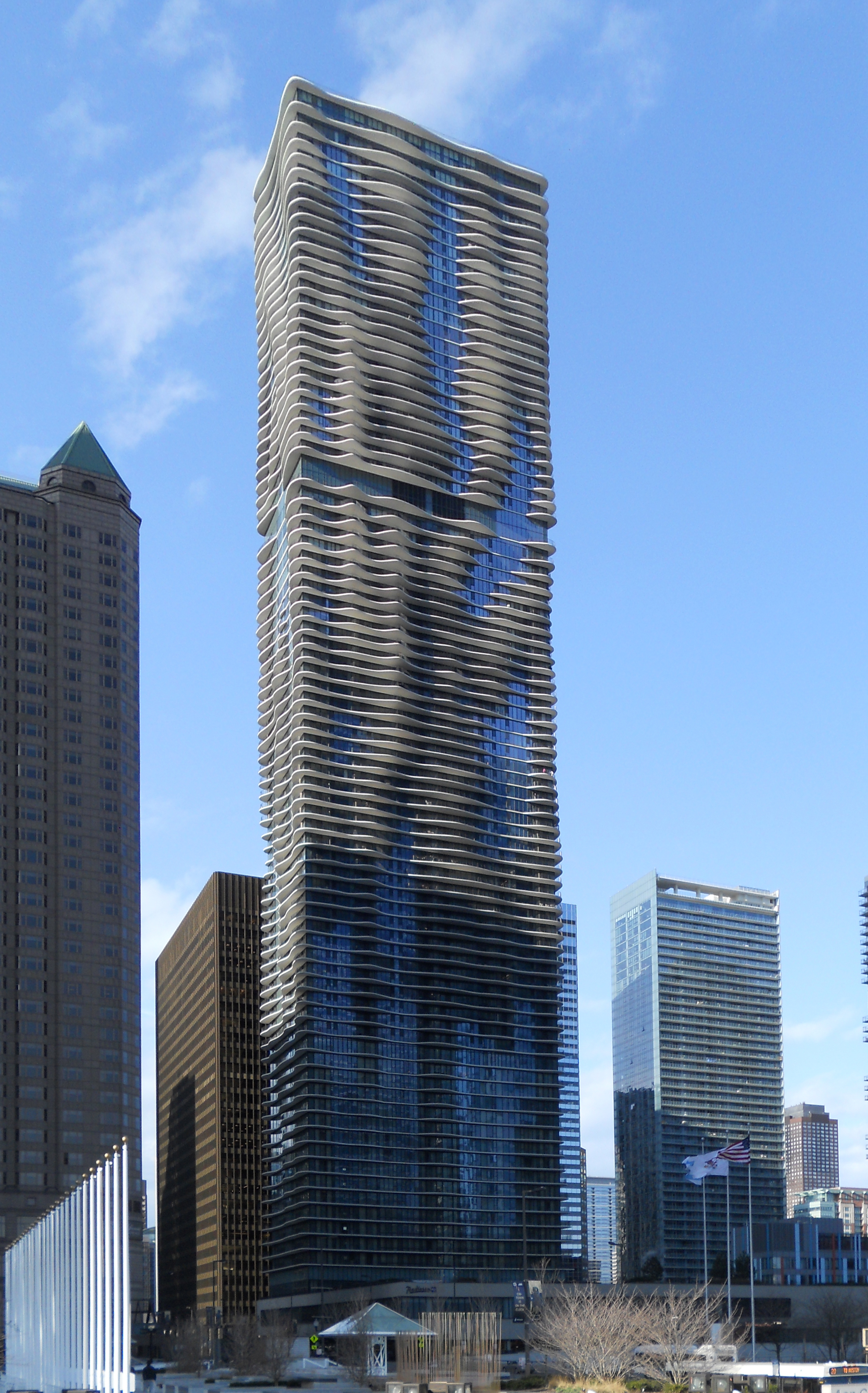
- The Aqua in 2020

- Location within Chicago metropolitan area Location within Illinois Location within the United States

General information
- Status: Completed
- Type: Hotel; Residential; Retail; Office
- Architectural style: Contemporary architecture
- Location: Chicago, Illinois, 225 N. Columbus Drive
- Coordinates: 41°53′11″N 87°37′12″W
- Construction started: 2007
- Completed: 2009
- Cost: US$300 million
- Owner: Aqua Realty Holdings LLC

Height
- Height: 261.8 m (859 ft)

Technical details
- Floor count: 82; 5 below ground
- Floor area: 1,990,635 sq ft (184,936.0 m^{2})
- Lifts/elevators: 24

Design and construction
- Architects: Design: Jeanne Gang of Studio Gang Architects; Architect of Record: James Loewenberg of Loewenberg & Assoc.
- Developer: Magellan Development Group
- Structural engineer: Magnusson Klemencic Associates
- Main contractor: James McHugh Construction Co

Other information
- Number of units: 474: Apartments; 334: Hotel

Website
- www.rentaqua.com

Aqua is an 82-story mixed-use skyscraper in Lakeshore East, downtown Chicago, Illinois. Designed by a team led by Jeanne Gang of Studio Gang Architects, with James Loewenberg of Loewenberg & Associates as the Architect of Record, it includes five levels of parking below ground. The building's eighty-story, 140,000 sq ft (13,000 m^{2}) base is topped by a 82,550 sq ft (7,669 m^{2}) terrace with gardens, gazebos, pools, hot tubs, a walking/running track and a fire pit. Each floor covers approximately 16,000 sq ft (1,500 m^{2}).

Aqua was awarded the Emporis Skyscraper Award as 2009 skyscraper of the year, and was shortlisted in 2010 for the biennial International Highrise Award. In celebration of the 2018 Illinois Bicentennial, Aqua was selected as one of the Illinois 200 Great Places by the American Institute of Architects Illinois component (AIA Illinois) and was recognized by USA Today Travel magazine as one of AIA Illinois's selections for Illinois 25 Must See Places. It has been compared to 8 Spruce Street in New York City.

When it was completed, the skyscraper was the world's tallest building designed by a woman. It was surpassed in 2020 by the nearby St. Regis, also located in Chicago and designed by Studio Gang Architects.

== Architect ==
Aqua was designed by Studio Gang Architects, led by firm principal and founder Jeanne Gang, and it was the firm's first skyscraper project. The project was the largest ever awarded to an American firm headed by a woman. Loewenberg & Associates are the architects of record, led by James Loewenberg.

== Design ==
The Aqua Tower is located at 225 North Columbus Drive, and is surrounded by high-rises. The location where the tower was built was a former rail yard that is adjacent to the Chicago River and Lake Michigan. To capture views of nearby landmarks for Aqua's residents, Gang stretched its balconies outward by as much as 12 ft (3.7 m). The result is a building composed of irregularly shaped concrete floor slabs which lend the facade an undulating, sculptural quality. Gang cites the striated limestone outcroppings that are a common topographic feature of the Great Lakes region as inspiration for these slabs. The tower is a late project for the repurposing of the site from industrial to commercial and residential use.

The building contains 55,000 ft^{2} (5,100 m^{2}) of retail and office space, in addition to 215 hotel rooms (floors 1–18), 476 rental residential units (floors 19–52), and 263 condominium units & penthouses (floors 53–81). Aqua is the first downtown building to combine condos, apartments and a hotel. Strategic Hotels & Resorts had agreed to acquire the first 15 floors of hotel space upon completion of the building, but terminated its $84 million contract for the space in August 2008, citing significant changes in the economic environment.

Carlson announced May 12, 2010, that it agreed to spend $125 million to open the first Radisson Blu hotel in the United States (Radisson Blu Aqua Hotel) on 18 vacant floors of the highrise. The 334-room hotel opened on November 1, 2011. The building was designed by the lead architect of Studio Gang Architects, Jeanne Gang.

The name 'Aqua' was assigned to the building by Magellan Development Group LLC. It fits the nautical theme of the other buildings in the Lake Shore East development, and is derived from the wave-like forms of the balconies; the tower's proximity to nearby Lake Michigan also influenced the name. Concrete Superintendent Paul Treacy, was nominated as one of Engineering News-Record's (ENR) top 25 news makers of 2008 for the design and implementation of the exterior formwork to mold the undulating façade of the Aqua.

== Sustainability ==
Sustainability was an important factor in Aqua's design. Gang and her team designed the balconies to shade the apartments from the sun in summer, to reduce the air-conditioning load. Windows that are more exposed to the sun have glass with a tinted, reflective coating to minimize solar heating in summer. The tower is LEED-NC certified. Only 16% of the waste from the tower's construction was disposed of in landfills; the remaining 84% went to recycling centers. A garden on the roof, one of the largest rooftop green spaces in Chicago, helps cool the building in summer; an efficient irrigation system provides water for its plants. The building has features to deter birds from colliding into its windows, including fritted glass on many of its windows. The apartments feature bamboo flooring, a recyclable material, and plumbing designed to conserve water.

Despite its eco-friendly features, there has been controversy over Aqua's energy efficiency. Building engineer Joseph Lstiburek has criticized Aqua's design, calling it "a thermodynamic obscenity" and "an 82-story heat exchanger in the heart of Chicago". He says the building wastes significant amounts of heat in winter and that its design fails to incorporate relatively simple insulating techniques that could have made it more thermally efficient. Aqua's greatest heat losses, he says, are through its balconies, which he says act as thermal bridges, comparing the balconies to the metal fins on a standard baseboard radiator. In particular, he cites infrared images of Aqua that show large regions of the building in colors indicating significant heat loss — oranges and magentas. An image detail shows that the warmest areas (i.e., where heat loss is greatest) are its balconies.

Gang admits that Aqua's balconies are a source of heat loss in winter, but says the building's green features that help cool the building in summer more than compensate for those losses. She says methods to insulate the balconies from the inner floors were considered during the design process, but ultimately were deemed too difficult to implement.

== Curve balconies ==
Jeanne Gang was a rising architect when she and Studio Gang (her firm) took on the project. With the training Jeanne had received during school, Jeanne began with her design that would included balconies extending 2–12 feet (0.6–3.7 m) outwards. Jeanne was inspired for this design from the topography layered limestone outcropping along the Great Lakes. The balconies are 9 inches (230 mm) thick and get thinner as they extend outwards to help with drainage. James Loewenberg helped SGA by finding an efficient way of creating the concrete balconies. He found that having an edge-form steel plate would guide the pour and once it was done drying it could be snapped back into a straight plane and reused for different curves on the other balconies. This method did leave the balconies without thermal breaks which caused criticism as it would cause a loss of heat during winters due to radiator effect. A function of the curve balconies is that they protect the building from harsh winds which happens to be one of the most difficult challenges in skyscraper engineering.

== Gallery ==
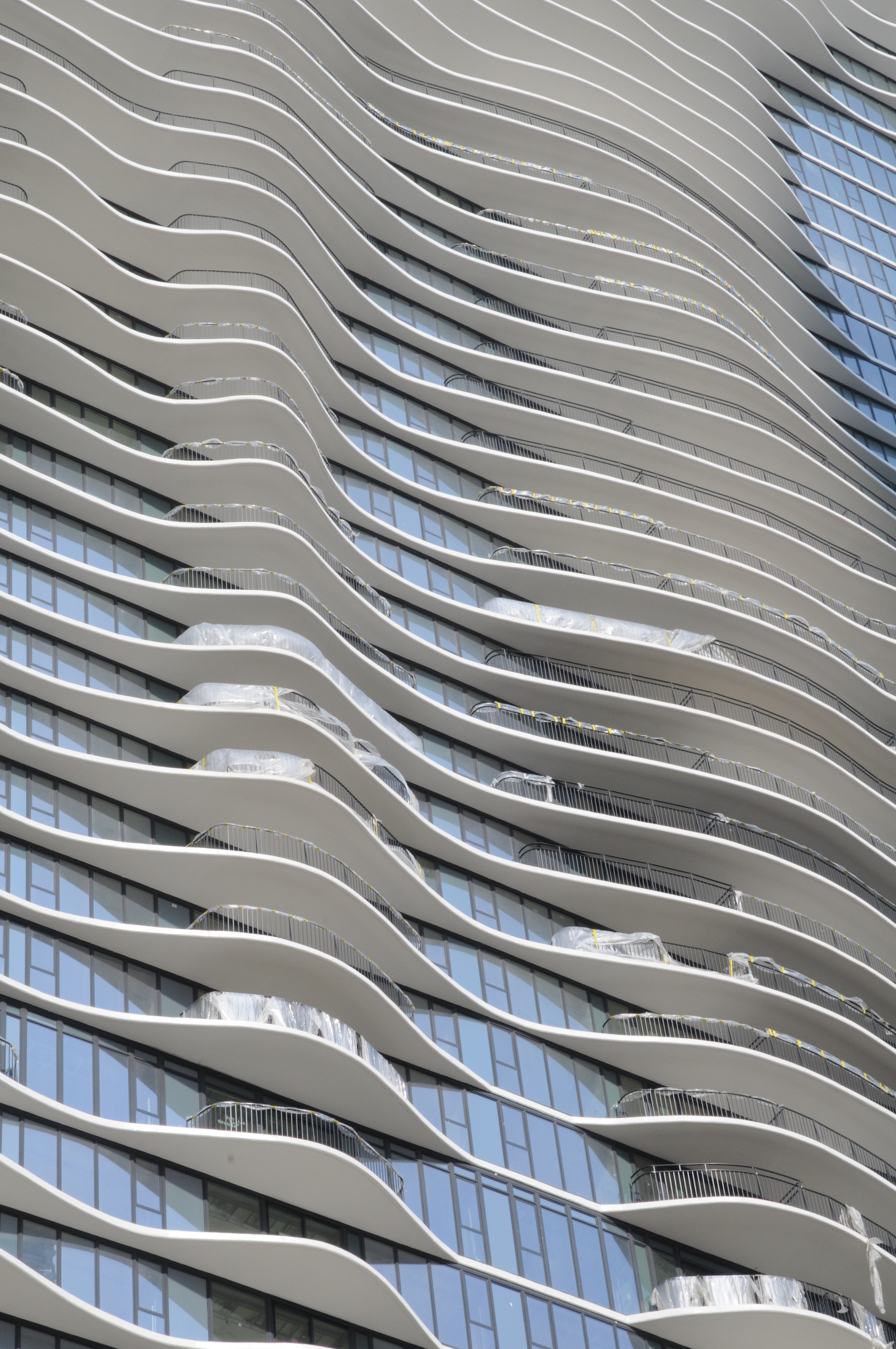
The facade departs dramatically from the surrounding modernist high-rises

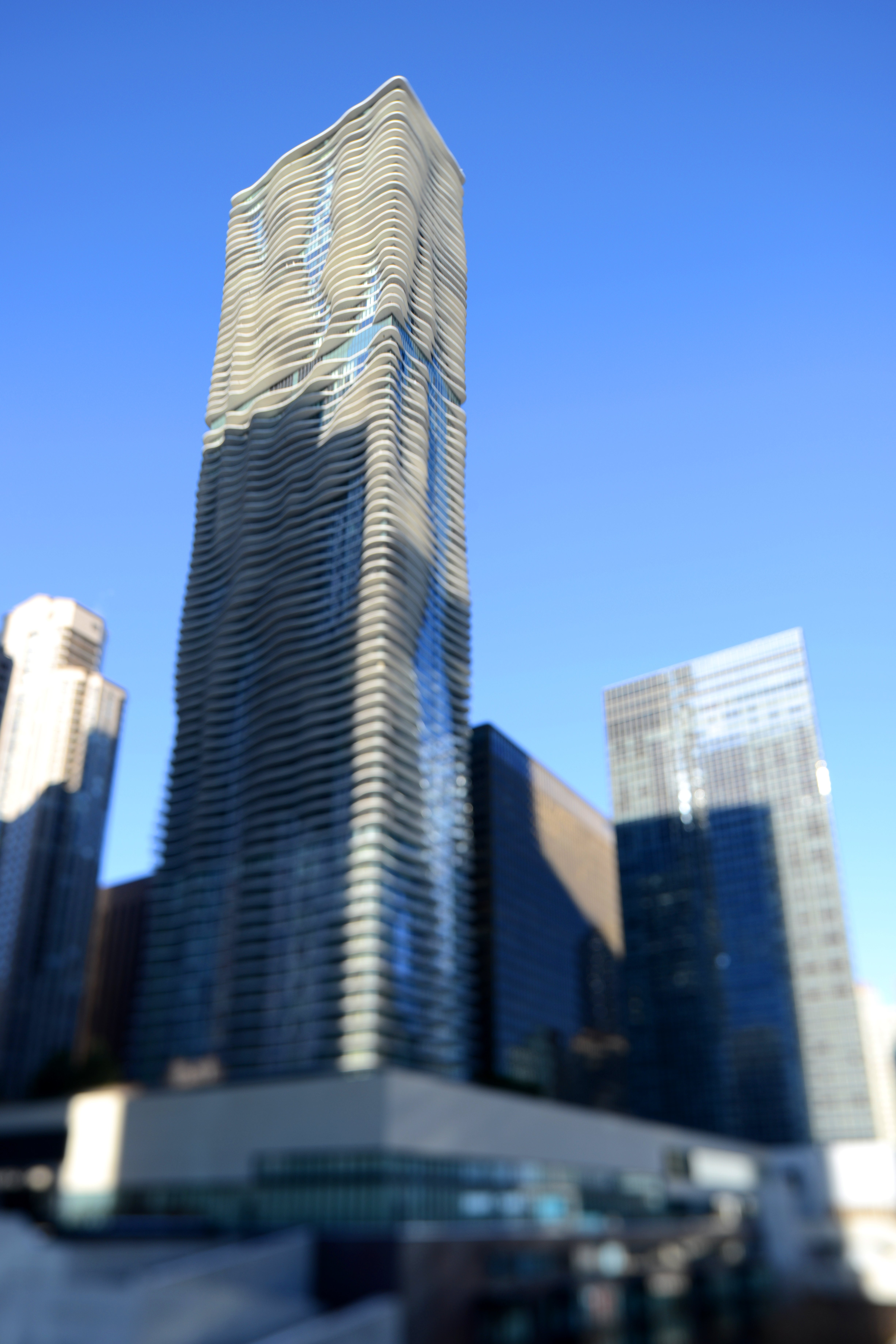
From the southeast

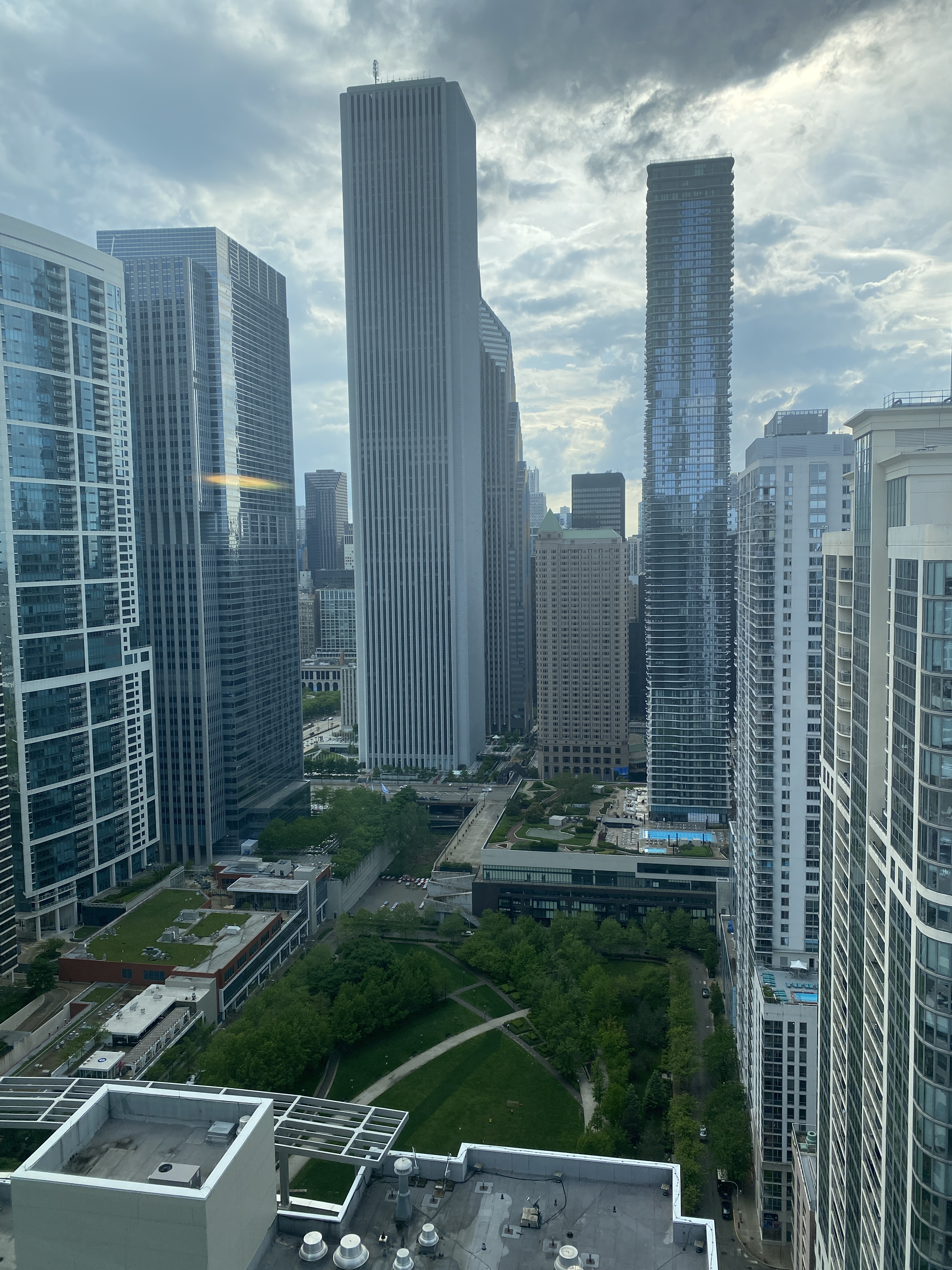
From the east

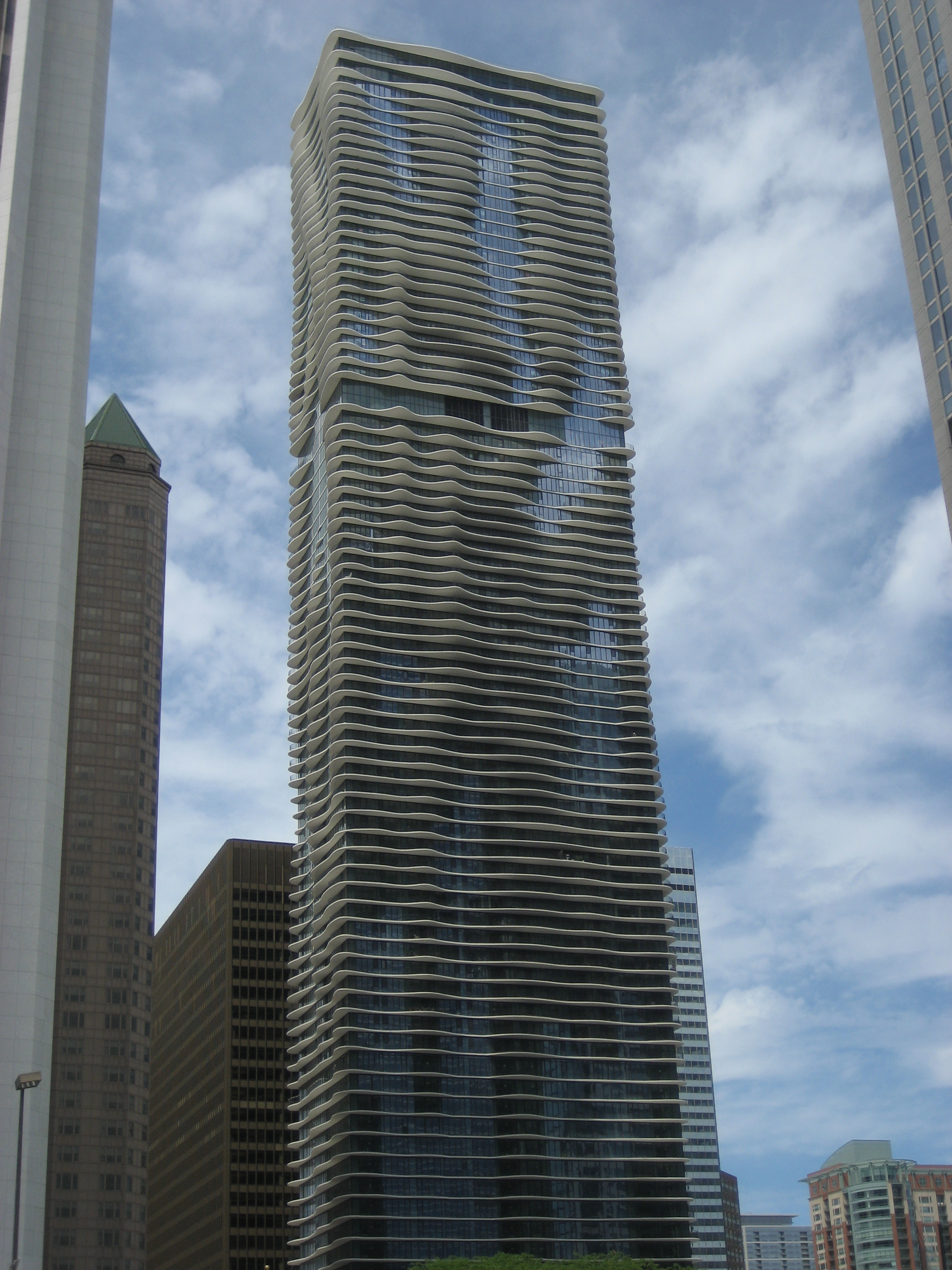
Aqua's southern facade

== See also ==
- Architecture of Chicago
- List of tallest buildings in Chicago
- List of tallest buildings in the United States
- List of tallest buildings in the world
- List of tallest buildings designed by women
