= 40 Tenth Avenue =

Building in Manhattan, New York

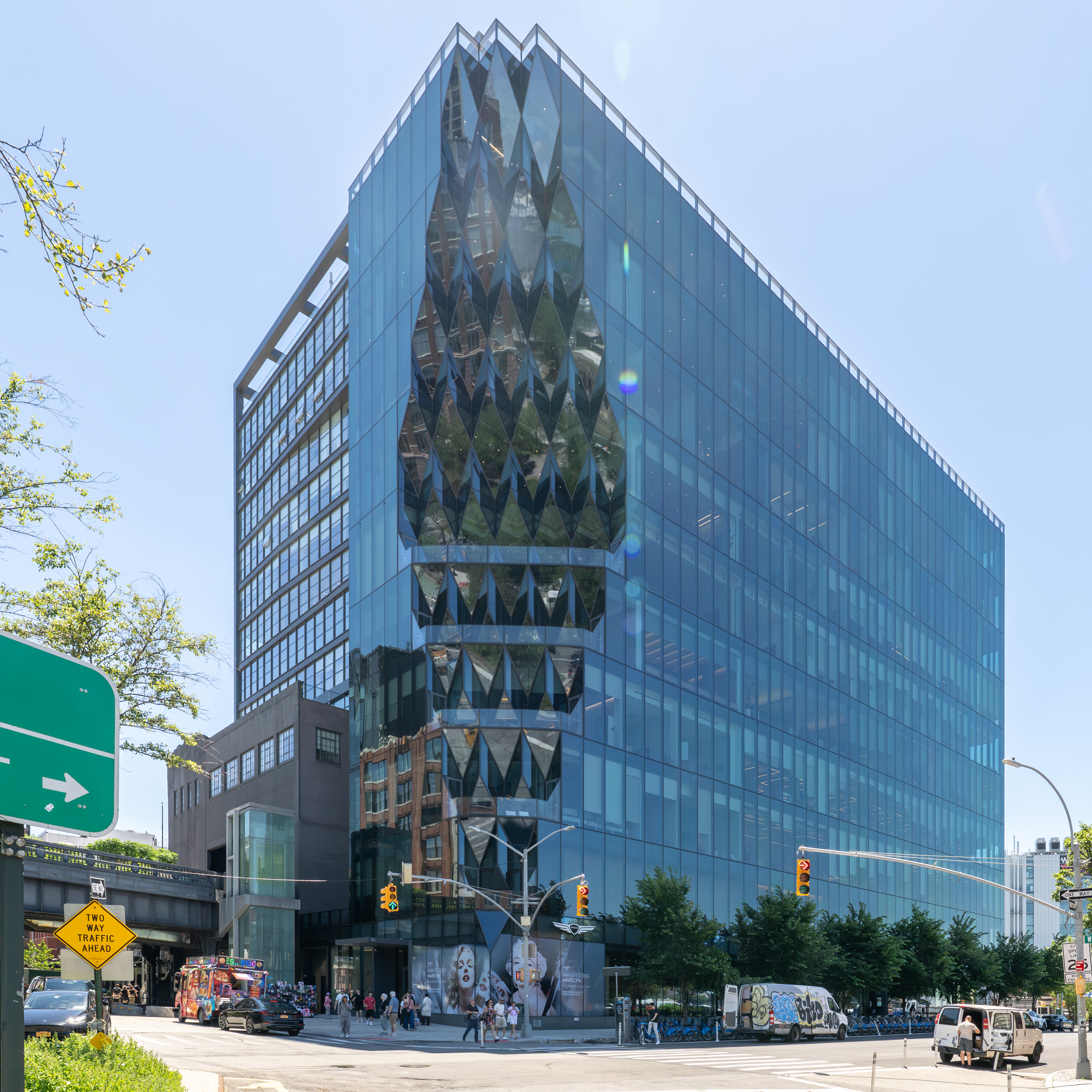
- (2026)
- Interactive map of the 40 Tenth Avenue area

General information
- Type: Office
- Location: 40 Tenth Avenue, New York, New York
- Coordinates: 40°44′30″N 74°00′30″W
- Completed: 2018

Height
- Roof: 190 feet (58 m)

Technical details
- Floor count: 12
- Floor area: 166,750 square feet (15,492 m^{2})

Design and construction
- Architect: Studio Gang Architects
- Developer: William Gottlieb Real Estate, Aurora Capital Associates
- Structural engineer: Arup Group
- Main contractor: Cauldwell Wingate Company

40 Tenth Avenue (originally referred to as Solar Carve) is an office building in the Meatpacking District of Manhattan in New York City. The structure is adjacent to the High Line.

== Planning and development ==
The building was first proposed in 2012, with designs released to the public then. Plans were later approved in 2014. Construction began in 2017 Advanced by Cauldwell Wingate Company and the project received $120 million in construction financing from Bank OZK in September 2017. The building topped out in early 2018 and was completed in late 2018, with the first tenants expected to move in to the building in March 2019.

Hyundai's luxury car brand Genesis signed a lease for all 40,000 square feet (3,700 m^{2}) of retail space in the building in December 2017. In March 2019, Starwood Capital Group signed a lease for the building's eighth floor.

== Design and reception ==
40 Tenth Avenue is Studio Gang's first commission in New York. The building features a chiseled, diamond-shaped curtain wall that was engineered to eliminate shadows cast onto the adjacent High Line park. Additionally, the facade allegedly minimized heat gain, reduced glare for drivers on the West Side Highway, and discouraged migratory birds strikes. The 12-story building includes 20,000 square feet (1,900 m^{2}) of outdoor space and 16 feet (4.9 m) high ceilings.

Justin Davidson, writing for New York, referred to the structure as "...one of the most exciting chapters in the future of the High Line." Similarly, Architectural Digest named the building one of their "14 Most Anticipated Buildings of 2019".
