= SOS Children's Villages – USA =

SOS Children's Villages – USA is part of SOS Children's Villages, a nongovernmental organization providing resources and training for the care of orphaned and abandoned children. The organization has been in operation since 1969 and has 501(c)(3) tax exempt status. Headquartered in Washington D.C., it strives to create awareness and build support for SOS villages around the world.

The facilities in Chicago were constructed by Jeanne Gang in 2008.
