= Solstice on the Park =

Coordinates: 41°47′38.1″N 87°35′9.2″W

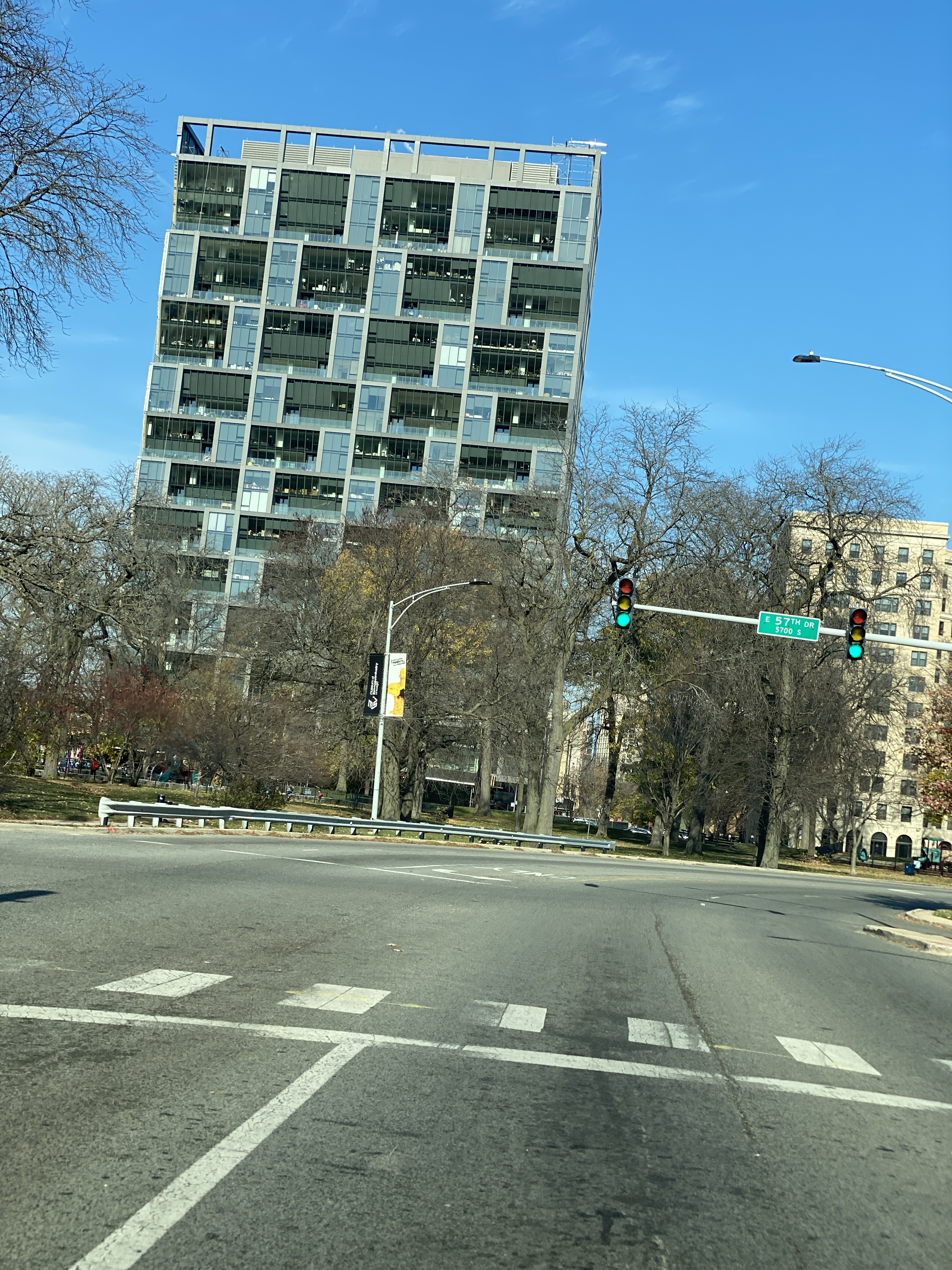
- From south in 2022
- Interactive map of the Solstice on the Park area

General information
- Type: Residential
- Location: 1616 E 56th St, Chicago, IL 60637, Chicago, United States
- Completed: 2018; 8 years ago

Design and construction
- Architect: Jeanne Gang

Solstice on the Park is a residential building in Chicago designed by architect Jeanne Gang and completed in 2018 in the Hyde Park Community area.

== Development ==
The building was originally designed in 2006 as condominium building, but economic conditions stalled construction. Revised plans for the building were approved in early 2016. Later that year, the developer announced construction would begin before 2017, and that tenants could begin living in the building as early as 2018. Work began in October. The building is designed to provide maximum natural light.

Financing was provided by Arkansas-based lender Bank of the Ozarks.
