= St. Regis Chicago =

Skyscraper in Chicago, Illinois

The St. Regis Chicago
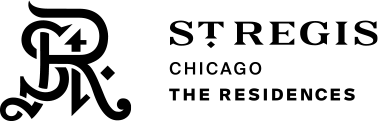

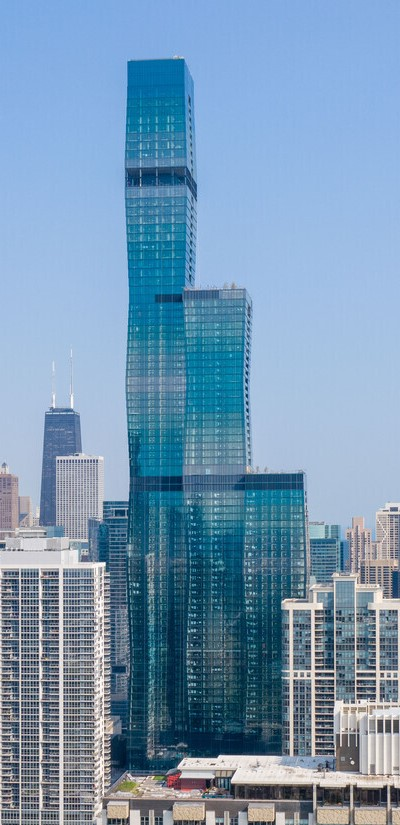
- The St. Regis Chicago in 2020
- Interactive map of the The St. Regis Chicago area
- Alternative names: Vista Tower, Wanda Vista Tower, 375 East Wacker

General information
- Status: Completed
- Type: Residential and hotel
- Location: 363 East Wacker Drive, Chicago, Illinois, United States
- Coordinates: 41°53′14″N 87°37′02″W
- Construction started: 2016
- Completed: 2020
- Operator: Magellan Development Group; Wanda Group

Height
- Height: 1,198 ft (365 m)

Technical details
- Floor count: 101
- Floor area: 1,414,000 sq ft (131,400 m^{2})

Design and construction
- Architect: Studio Gang Architects
- Developer: Magellan Development Group
- Main contractor: McHugh Construction

Other information
- Number of restaurants: 2, Tre Dita and Miru

Website
- srresidenceschicago.com

The St. Regis Chicago (formerly Wanda Vista Tower) is a 101-story, 1,198 ft (365 m) multi-use supertall skyscraper within the Lakeshore East development in Chicago, Illinois, United States. Completed in 2020, it is the city's third-tallest building, behind the Willis Tower and Trump Hotel and Tower. Designed by architect Jeanne Gang and her architectural firm, Studio Gang Architects, it is the tallest structure in the world designed by a woman.

The Magellan Development Group jointly developed the tower with the Chinese firm Wanda Group. Magellan, who had hired Gang to design Aqua in Lakeshore East, rehired her for the Vista Tower in 2014. The Chicago Plan Commission approved plans for the building in late 2015, and a groundbreaking ceremony took place on September 6, 2016. The Wanda Vista topped out in April 2019, and Wanda sold its ownership stake to Magellan the next year. The tower was renamed the St. Regis Chicago in November 2020 after St. Regis Hotels & Resorts agreed to operate the hotel. The hotel rooms did not open until 2023 due to uncertainty over who would operate its restaurants, while sales of the condominiums lagged expectations.

The St. Regis consists of three interconnected masses with differing heights. The superstructure uses a buttressed core, and unlike in most buildings, the building's perimeter columns step inward and outward. The building contains uninhabited "blow-through floors" to reduce wind-induced sway, and six tuned mass damper tanks also counteract the movement of the wind. Inside, the St. Regis Hotel occupies the first 10 floors of the structure with 192 units, while the St. Regis Residences consists of 393 luxury condominium residences from the 11th floor upward. There is an amenity area for residents on floor 47, as well as two restaurants in the hotel section of the building.

== History ==
=== Development ===
Prior to developing what was then known as the Wanda Vista Tower, Magellan Development Group had hired Jeanne Gang to design Aqua, a skyscraper in the Lakeshore East area of the Chicago Loop. In 2014, Magellan announced that it would hire Gang to design another skyscraper in Lakeshore East. Wang Jianlin of the Chinese firm Wanda Group subsequently agreed to co-develop the new skyscraper. At the time, Wanda was one of several large Chinese companies investing in American real estate, and the Wanda Vista was the largest real-estate investment made by the Chinese firm in the U.S. The Wanda Vista was announced in December 2014 as a 88-story building, with 250 hotel rooms and 390 condominiums; the height was increased in April 2015 to 93 stories. The tower was planned to either 1,144 feet (349 m), 1,186 feet (361 m), or 1,189 feet (362 m) high, making it Chicago's third-tallest in any case. In November 2015, the Chicago Plan Commission approved the plans, which called for 210 hotel rooms and 410 residences. The height limit for the Wanda Vista site was originally 645 feet (197 m); to permit the Wanda Vista's increased size, the height limit for the adjacent Site O was revised downward from 900 to 680 feet (270 to 210 m).

The developers opened a sales center for the tower in early 2016; the sales center included renderings of the building and models of the apartments. That May, Wanda and Magellan announced that they would begin constructing the Wanda Vista. A formal groundbreaking ceremony took place on September 6, 2016. In June 2017, Ping An Bank gave the project a $700 million construction loan, at the time the largest such loan ever given to a construction project in Chicago. To entice tenants, Magellan proposed allowing residents to rent a fleet of Tesla Motors vehicles, which would have made the Wanda Vista the first luxury development in Chicago with a residents' carsharing program. That year, the tower's design was modified, with the conversion of one condominium story into an empty floor, after wind tunnel tests found that the building would otherwise sway too much in the wind.

Following a Chinese government crackdown on foreign investment in mid-2017, the publicly traded Wanda Hotel Development transferred its stake in the Wanda Vista to a privately owned subsidiary, Dalian Wanda Commercial Properties. At the time, the superstructure had reached the 10th floor, and around 35% of the condos had been sold; according to Magellan, foreign nationals represented one-third of the buyers for whom information was available. Media reports indicated in early 2018 that Wanda wanted to sell its ownership stake in the building as part of an effort to sell off its non-Chinese real-estate holdings. The firm tried to sell its ownership stake to the Canadian conglomerate Triple Five Group, in exchange for ownership of One Beverly Hills in California; the sale ultimately did not occur. The tower's superstructure had reached its halfway point by mid-2018, and the tower topped out in April 2019.

Half of the tower's condominiums had been sold by mid-2020, and Wanda was planning to operate the building's hotel rooms. That July, Wanda agreed to sell its 90% ownership stake to Magellan for $270 million. Sales at the building had slowed down due to the COVID-19 pandemic and civil unrest in major American cities. Additionally, there were fewer potential Chinese buyers due to restrictions on the renminbi imposed by the Chinese government, and buyers were reluctant to purchase units because of uncertainty over the building's ownership. Magellan continued to promote the project as a joint venture with Wanda, prompting two buyers to sue for breach of contract. A third buyer sued to break his contract after claiming that Magellan had imposed an upcharge after he had already bought his condo.

=== Opening ===
The tower was completed in 2020, having cost around $1 billion. The sales of the first condominiums were finalized that year. After St. Regis Hotels & Resorts was contracted to operate the hotel rooms, the building became known as the St. Regis Chicago in November 2020; the same month, Alinea Group also announced plans to open two restaurants in the hotel. The first residents moved in that December. By late 2021, three-fifths of the condos had reportedly been sold or were under contract. Alinea canceled its plans for the building's restaurants that year, citing supply chain issues and employee shortages related to the COVID-19 pandemic. Alinea's withdrawal prompted St. Regis to postpone the hotel's opening by eight months, even though the hotel rooms were nearly completed. Lettuce Entertain You Enterprises agreed to take over the restaurants in 2022.

The hotel opened on May 19, 2023, shortly after the tower's first restaurant, Miru, opened. The same week, a joint venture between Gencom and GD Holdings agreed to buy the hotel rooms for approximately $134 million, after several years of negotiations; the joint venture took out a $76 million loan to pay for the hotel. By then, 65% of the building's condominiums had been sold. Magellan also obtained a $150 million inventory loan that year, using the building's unsold condos as collateral for the loan. The tower's second restaurant, Tre Dita, opened in March 2024. After struggling to sell the remaining unsold condos, Magellan sold 84 vacant condos to GD Holdings in November 2024 for $117 million. Wanda Group—which had owned 37 condos in the building, having never marketed them—placed its condos for sale in March 2025. The slow rate of condo sales, which averaged just over 2 sales per month in 2024, were attributed to the city's sluggish market for luxury condominiums, which had been impacted significantly due to the COVID-19 pandemic.

== Architecture ==
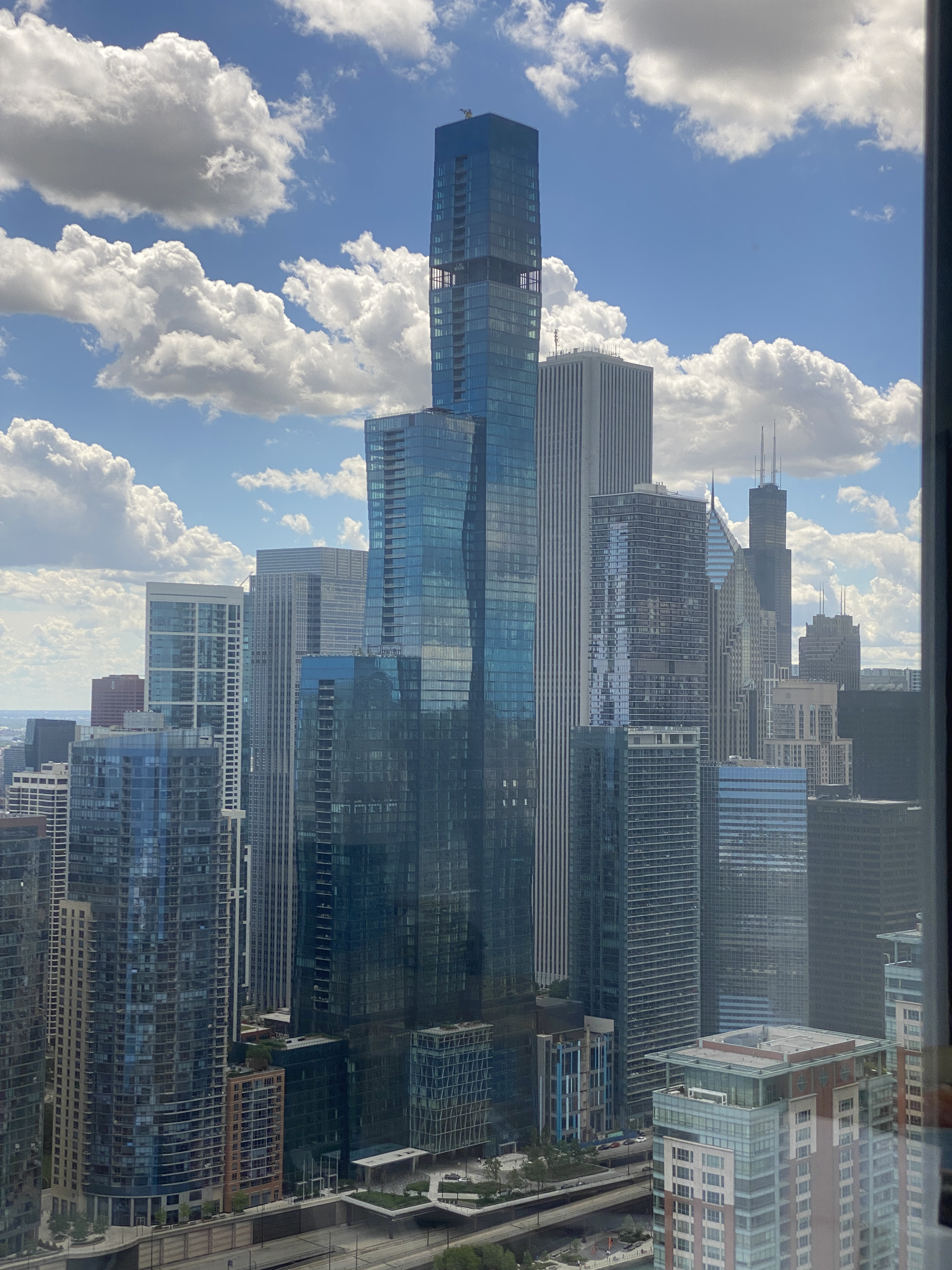
St. Regis Chicago at 363 East Wacker Drive from Lake Point Tower, 2022

The building's chief architect is Jeanne Gang, head of Studio Gang Architects, with bKL Architecture as the project's architect of record. The condominium interiors were designed by hospitality design firm Hirsch Bedner Associates, while the hotel interior were designed by San Francisco firm Gensler. Philadelphia-based OLIN designed the project's green spaces, including the rooftop gardens. The structural engineering of the tower was managed by Magnusson Klemencic Associates. F.E. Moran Fire Protection was contracted to install the building's fire protection systems, including over 18,000 sprinkler heads, five fire pumps, and a 30,000-gallon water storage tank across 95 floors.

The St. Regis Chicago is the city's third-tallest building at 1,191 ft (363 m), ahead of the Aon Center and behind the Willis Tower and Trump Hotel and Tower. When it was completed, the St. Regis Chicago was the tallest structure in the world designed by a woman. The design has three interconnected masses with differing heights. The east, middle, and west masses are 47, 71, and 93 stories tall, respectively. Mechanical space occupies the remaining floors, bringing the tallest mass's height to 101 stories above the ground. The adjacent Wacker Drive consists of several levels, so the tower measures 95 stories high as calculated from Wacker Drive's top level. Because of the irregular massing, the building has eight corners; Gang described the massing as resembling a frustum, or a pyramid without a pointed top.

The structure uses 115,000 cubic yards (88,000 m^{3}) of concrete, 12,600 short tons (11,200 long tons; 11,400 t) of steel, and 775,000 square feet (72,000 m^{2}) of exterior glass panes. The three masses feature a curvilinear design, and are made up of alternating frustums. The masses of the tower are covered with six different shades of glass. The design was intended to meet Silver Leadership in Energy and Environmental Design (LEED) standards.

=== Structural features ===
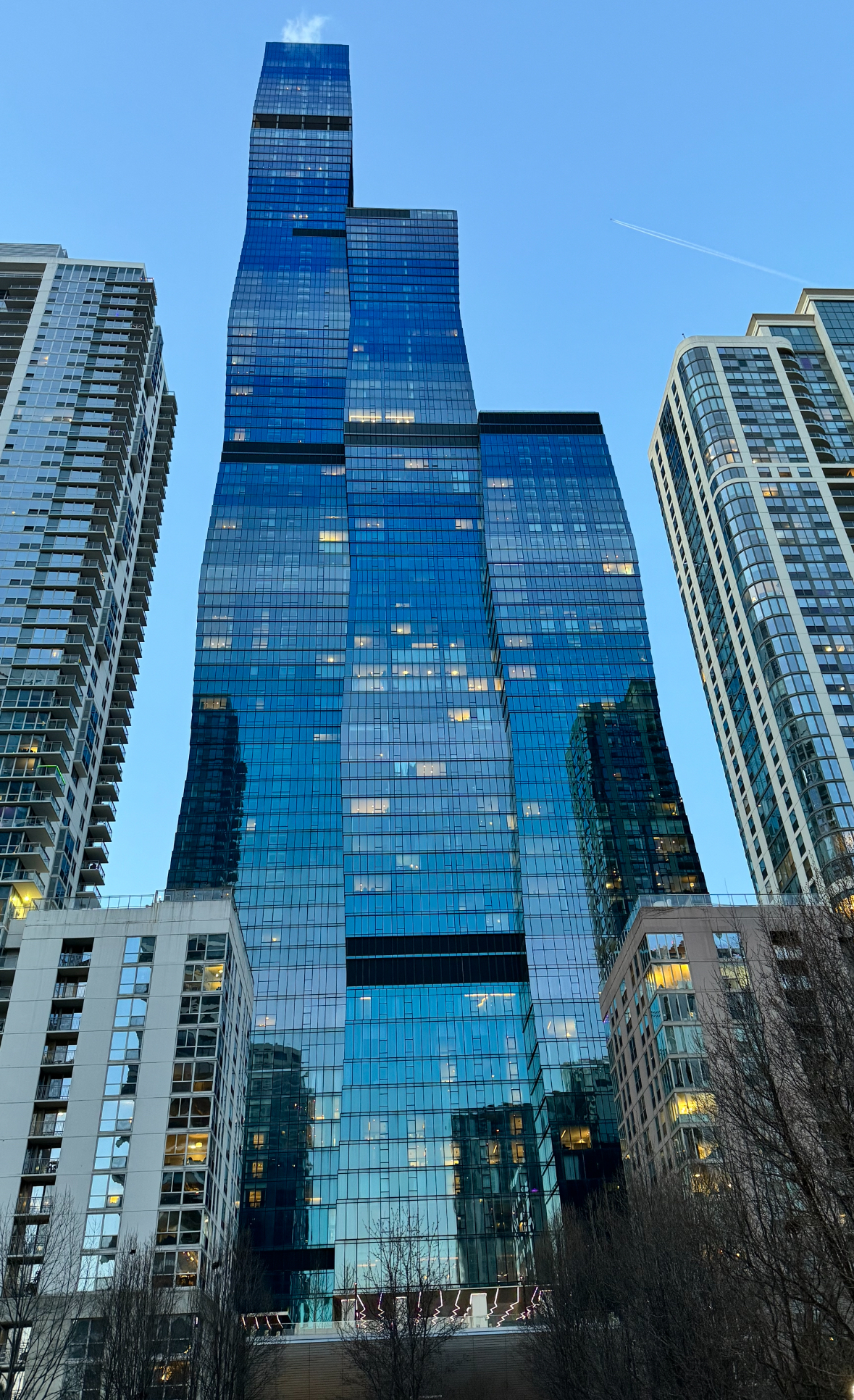
The St. Regis Chicago in March 2024

Unlike in most buildings, the building's perimeter columns step inward and outward instead of going directly upwards. Each column projects about 5 inches outward or inward from the one below it. This was chosen over using columns set on a diagonal, which would have sacrificed interior space.

The superstructure uses a buttressed core. There are two elevator cores, one each within the west and east masses, which are connected by a concrete spine. The concrete spine is 508 feet (155 m) tall, rising from floors 15 to 51. Walls also extend from the concrete spine to the perimeter of the building. The central mass is carried above a pathway that connects Lakeshore East to the Chicago Riverwalk. Columns that descend into the foundations support a 123 ft-long (37 m) spine wall. This 2 ft-thick (0.61 m) spine transfers wind loads from the central mass to the cores of the west and east masses.

The building contains uninhabited "blow-through floors" to reduce wind-induced sway. Floor 83 was originally supposed to be a condominium floor, but it was converted into a blow-through floor following a wind tunnel test. The blow-through floors are covered by vertical grates that measure 24 feet (7.3 m) high and are painted the same color as the windows. Six tuned mass damper tanks, holding more than 400,000 US gallons (1,500,000 L; 330,000 imp gal) of water, counteract the movement of the wind. Two of the dampers are on the 83rd floor, while the other four dampers are near the top of the building. The roof of the central mass contains an outdoor terrace spanning 8,000 square feet (740 m^{2}).

=== Interior ===
The St. Regis Chicago is a mixed-use residential and hotel building. The St. Regis Hotel occupies the first 10 floors of the structure, with 191 or 192 hotel units. The hotel's units have an average area of 640 square feet (59 m^{2}), the largest average room size in a luxury hotel in Chicago.

The St. Regis Residences consists of 393 luxury condominium residences, which start on floor 11. Most of the residences range from one to four bedrooms, with ceilings measuring 9 1/3 feet (2.8 m). The units on floors 71 through 91 are "sky penthouses", each occupying an entire story, with higher 11 1/3-foot (3.5 m) ceilings. The St. Regis's highest residence occupies nearly 7,000 square feet (650 m^{2}) across floors 92 and 93, with four bedrooms; it was marketed as the highest apartment in the U.S. outside of New York City. The units on floors 71 and 72 were combined to create a single 11,000-square-foot (1,000 m^{2}) duplex, which sold for $20.56 million in 2022, becoming the tower's highest-priced unit.

==== Amenities and restaurants ====
Floor 47 is the dedicated private residential amenity floor with an outdoor pool, spa, golf lounge, wine closet, and fitness center. In addition, residents have shared access to all of the St. Regis Hotel amenities, including the St. Regis Spa and in-room dining.

The St. Regis Chicago has two restaurants owned and operated by Lettuce Entertain You Restaurants. Miru, a Japanese-inspired eatery, is located on the 11th floor of the central massing. In addition to its interior dining room, Miru has a small sushi bar and a large, north-facing outdoor terrace. In March 2024, Evan Funke's Tuscan-inspired Tre Dita opened in the St. Regis Chicago. The name of Tre Dita, an Italian steakhouse, is a reference to the building's three masses and the fact that "three fingers is the proper measurement for a bistecca Fiorentina".

== Reception ==
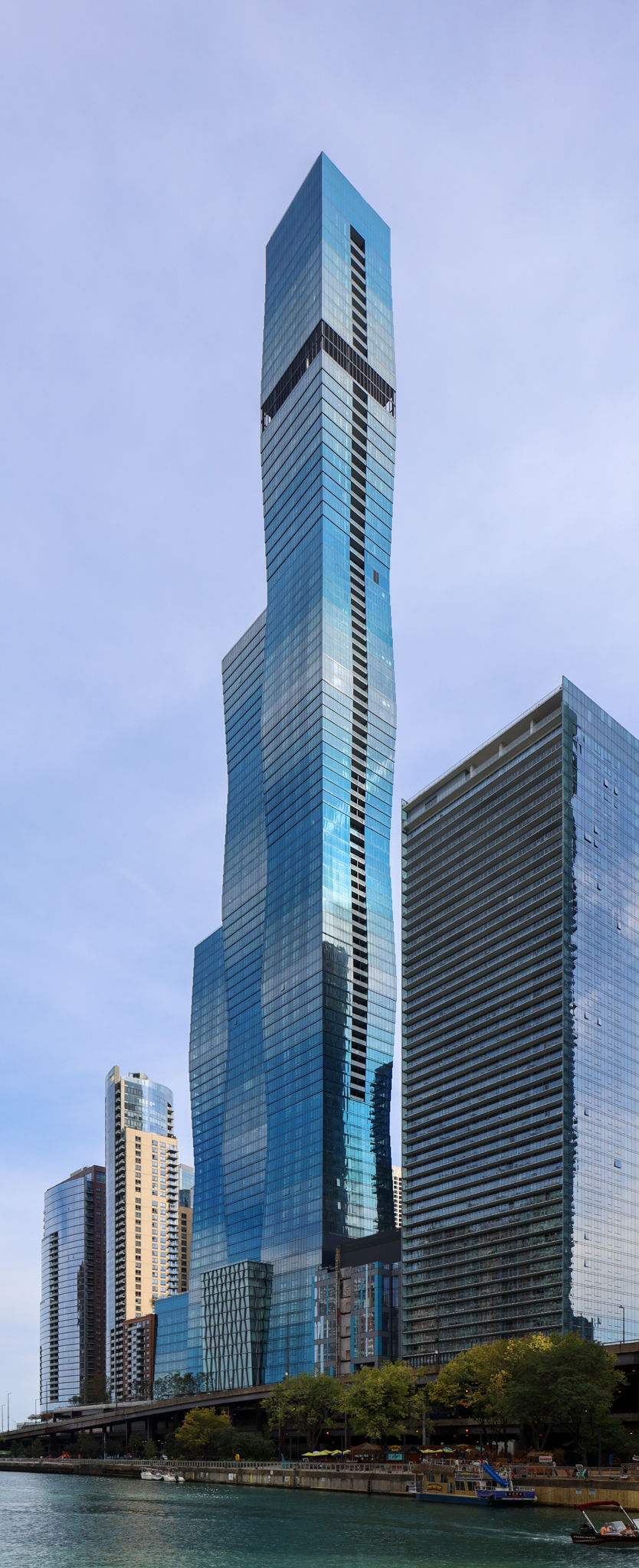
View from the Chicago River

Edward Keegan of Crain's Chicago Business praised the design of the building, calling it "second only to Hancock in the gracefulness in its silhouette" and a "proud and soaring thing". However, he also criticized several engineering choices, notably the execution of the tower's blow-through floors. Blair Kamin of the Chicago Tribune wrote that the tower's height, waterfront location, and design had "redrawn Chicago's skyline", describing the massing as "stacks of tapering, truncated pyramids that alternate between right-side-up and upside-down". The design has also been likened to sculptor Constantin Brâncuși's Endless Column.

== See also ==
- List of tallest buildings in the United States
- List of tallest buildings in Chicago
- List of buildings with 100 floors or more
- Architecture of Chicago
