= Chinese American Service League =

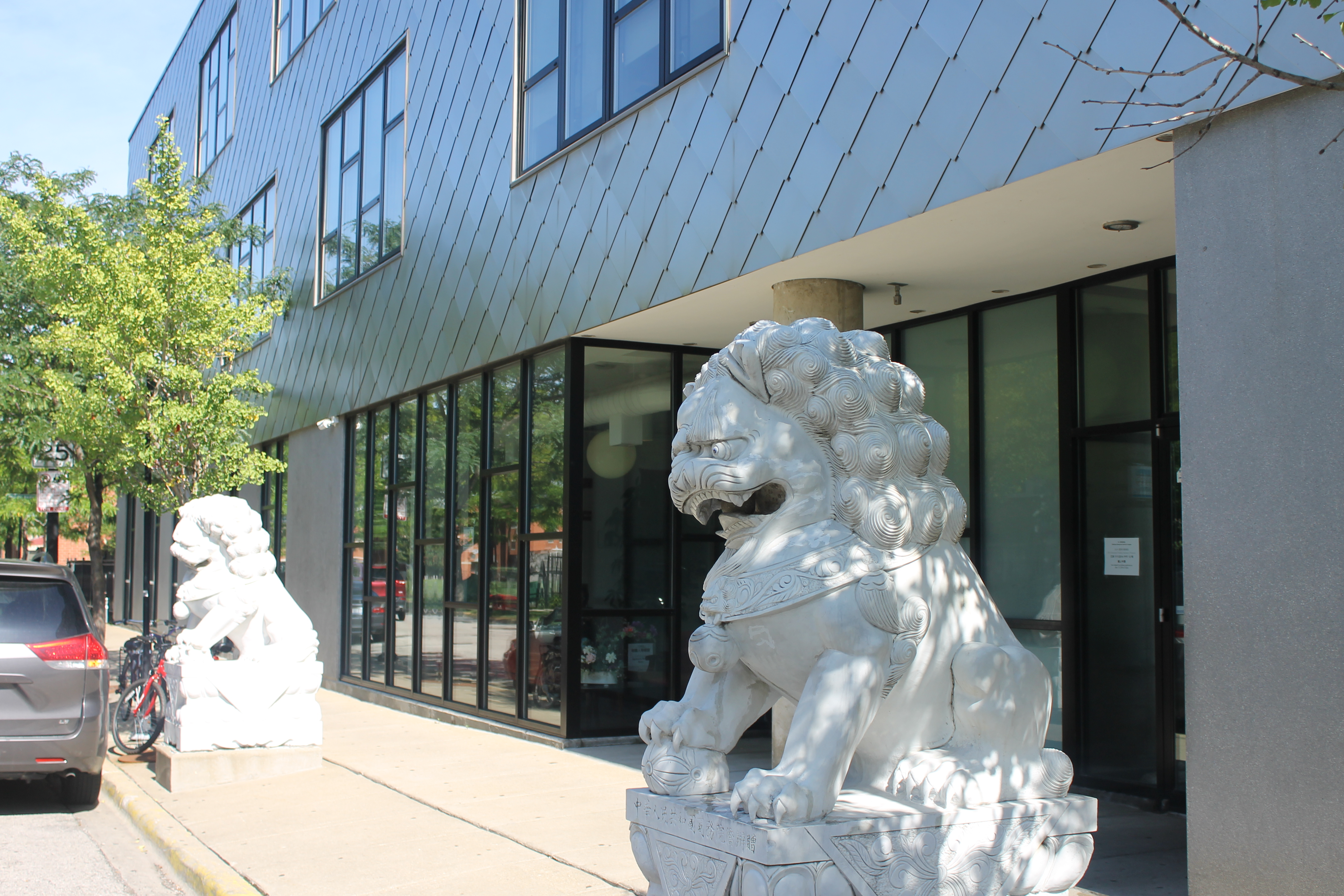
Exterior of CASL's Kam L. Liu Building. CASL has been operating out of this location since 2004.

The Chinese American Service League (CASL) is an all-inclusive non-profit agency with over 45 years of experience connecting families and individuals with the vital support they need: providing an educational and cultural foundation for children, ensuring seniors live full and independent lives with dignity, enhancing education and training for tomorrow's workforce, putting immigrants on the pathway to citizenship, securing our community's housing and financial well-being, navigating healthcare systems and wellness resources, and fighting for equal access to justice.

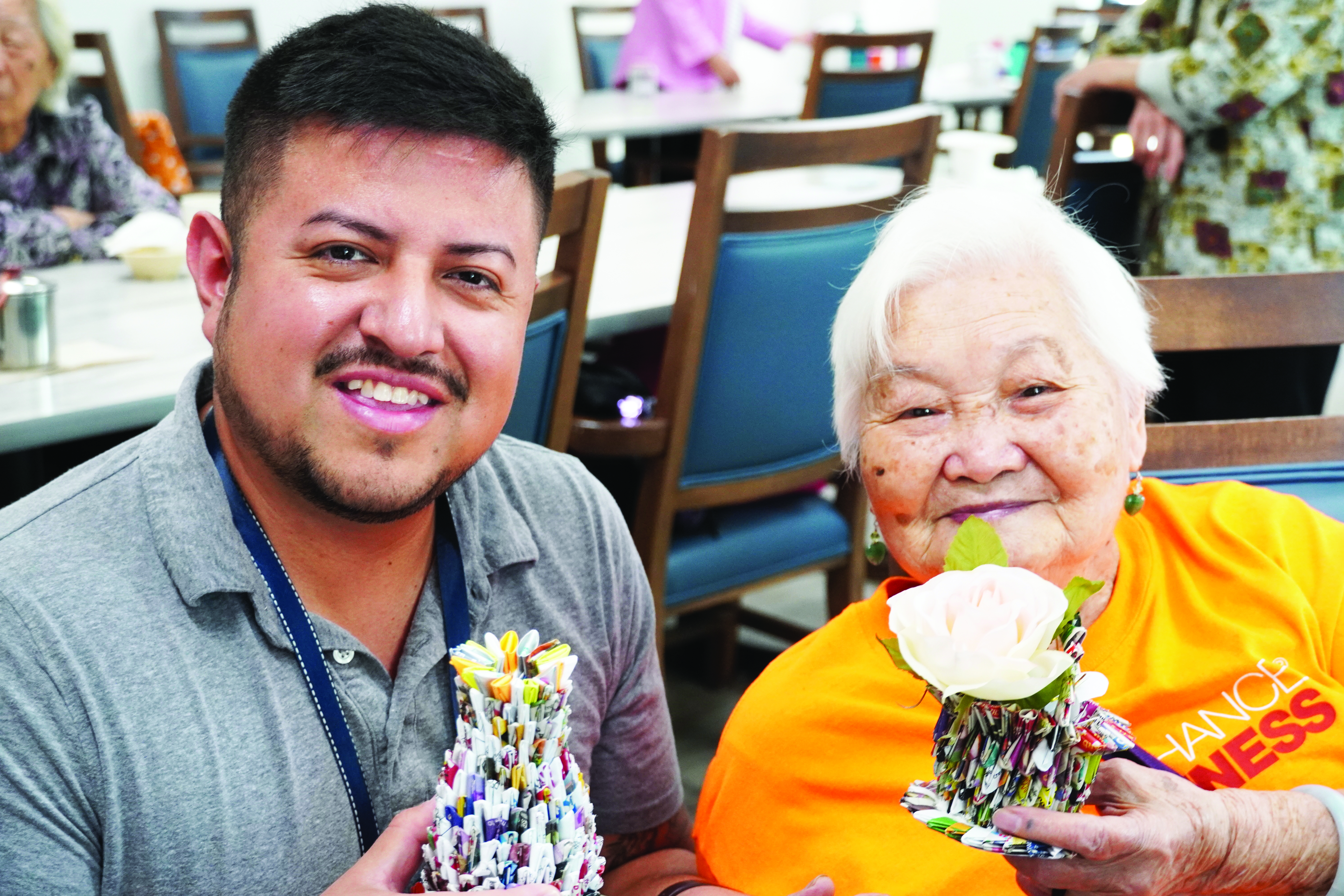
One of CASL's staff members and an Adult Day Services Client

== Mission ==
Building on the wisdom of generations, CASL catalyzes the transformation of individuals, families, and the community for an equitable future.

== History ==
CASL was founded in Chicago's Chinatown in 1978 when a group of Chinese immigrant friends recognized that social services were not widely available to the Chinese immigrant diaspora. Led by Bernie Wong, the group's first services for the Chinatown community included translating letters from English to Chinese, claiming tax rebates, and accessing public aid programs. Soon after, in 1979, CASL became officially established as a non-profit organization, with Bernie Wong as its founder. Since then, CASL has been the largest social service agency that serves AANHPI (Asian American, Native Hawaiian, and Pacific Islander) and other minority communities in the Midwest.

CASL has continued to uphold Bernie Wong's vision and legacy through their mission, vision, and core values serving nearly 7,000 clients in 2023.

== Services ==
Today CASL has expanded to more than 20 programs and services to meet community needs based on Social Drivers of Health (SDOH) data. The current list of services and programs as of 2024 include:

- Adult Day Services
- Adult Employment and Career Development
- Anti-Hate Action Center
- After School Care
- Alzheimer's Program
- Behavioral Health
- Citizenship and Immigration
- Center for Social Impact
- Change InSight®
- Culinary Training Program
- English Language Classes
- Enhance® Fitness
- Financial Literacy
- Food and Nutrition Services
- Head Start and Early Head Start
- Healthcare and Wellness
- Housing Program
- Illinois Welcome Center
- In-Home Care
- Legal Services
- Pine Tree Senior Council
- Public Benefits
- Small Access Home Repairs for Seniors

== See also ==
- Chinese in Chicago
