= Mecanoo =

Dutch architecture firm

Practice information
- Partners: Francine Houben, Dick van Gameren, Nuno Fontarra, Rick Splinter, Arne Lijbers.
- Founders: Francine Houben, Henk Döll, Roelf Steenhuis, Erick van Egeraat, Chris de Weijer
- Founded: 1984
- Location: Delft, Netherlands
- Coordinates: 52.013315°N 4.354545°E

Significant works and honors
- Buildings: Library of Birmingham; Delft University of Technology Library; Revitalisation Martin Luther King Jr. Memorial Library; Amsterdam University College; Delft Railway Station and Municipal Offices; HOME Arts Centre; La Llotja de Lleida; Montevideo Residential Tower; Hilton Amsterdam Airport Schiphol; National Kaohsiung Center for the Arts; Palace of Justice in Córdoba, Namdaemun Tower in Seoul.

Website
- mecanoo.nl

Mecanoo is an architecture firm based in Delft, Netherlands. Mecanoo was founded in 1984 by Francine Houben, Henk Döll, Roelf Steenhuis, Erick van Egeraat and Chris de Weijer.

== Foundation ==
Houben, Döll and Steenhuis won a competition to design youth housing at Kruisplein in Rotterdam while they were still students at Delft University of Technology. The project marked a turning point in Dutch social housing which was then mainly oriented towards family units. Together with Van Egeraat and De Weijer, Mecanoo was founded in 1984 in Delft.

The name Mecanoo is a combination of three different words: the British model construction kit Meccano, the neoplasticist magazine Mécano drawn up by Theo van Doesburg and the motto 'Ozoo', adopted by the original founding members for the Kruisplein competition entry which was located in the area of Rotterdam's former zoo.

Over the years (1988-2003), four of the five founders of Mecanoo - Steenhuis, Van Egeraat, De Weijer, and Döll - have left the company. Houben, as the creative director, is still involved with the firm.

In 2020, Mecanoo became a partner in the Data and Knowledge Hub for Healthy Urban Living, an independent and open platform of public and private organizations working together for a healthy urban living environment.

== Office location ==
Mecanoo is located on one of the oldest canals of the Netherlands, the Oude Delft, in the historical city centre of Delft. This canal house dating from 1750 was designed by the Italian architect Bollina. The interior has a 40-metre long corridor with a stairwell, ceilings and doors with stucco work and carvings in Louis XIV style. After Oude Delft 203 had been occupied in the nineteenth century by several leading citizens, it was sold in 1886 to the Roman Catholic charity for the poor, later the St. Hippolytus Foundation. Until 1970 it served as lodging for the elderly and later as a hospital. In 1983 Mecanoo rented a part of the canal house and now occupies the entire building.

Mecanoo also has offices in London, New York and Kaohsiung.

== Design philosophy ==
According to the practice each project responds to the philosophy of People, Place and Purpose: to the client’s requirements and the user’s needs (People); the physical context, climate and culture (Place); and the current and predicted potential of a building’s function (Purpose).

The result is unique solutions for each varying situation, in which the disciplines of architecture, urban planning, landscape and interior combine in a non-traditional way. Over the years Mecanoo learned that functions inevitably change. Therefore, they create buildings that are prepared for (un)predictable change.

Sustainability is an inherent aspect of their design approach, feeding into an ambition to create new identity in a world of globalization, resulting in inspiring and authentic places, socially relevant for people and communities.

Preoccupied not by a focus on form, but on process, consultation, context, urban scale and integrated sustainable design strategies, the practice creates culturally significant buildings with a human touch.

== Oeuvre ==
Since 1984, Mecanoo has been working progressively on an extensive and various business. In the early years, the work is mainly consist of social housing projects in urban renewal areas. Currently they are focusing on complex, multifunctional buildings and integral urban developments. Project types include houses, schools, campuses, neighbourhoods, theatres, libraries, sky scrapers, parks, squares, highways, cities, hotels, museums and places of worship.

Mecanoo is a Dutch architecture firm whose staff includes Architects, Interior designers, Urban planner, Landscape architects and Architectural engineering. It has completed projects in the Netherlands, Spain, the United Kingdom, China, Taiwan, South Korea, Norway, Poland and the United States.

Mecanoo has become a prominent Dutch architectural practice with an international and multidisciplinary team of architects, interior designers, urban planners, landscape architects, and architectural engineers who have completed projects in the Netherlands, Spain, the United Kingdom, China, Taiwan, South Korea, Norway, Poland, and the United States.

== Selected works ==
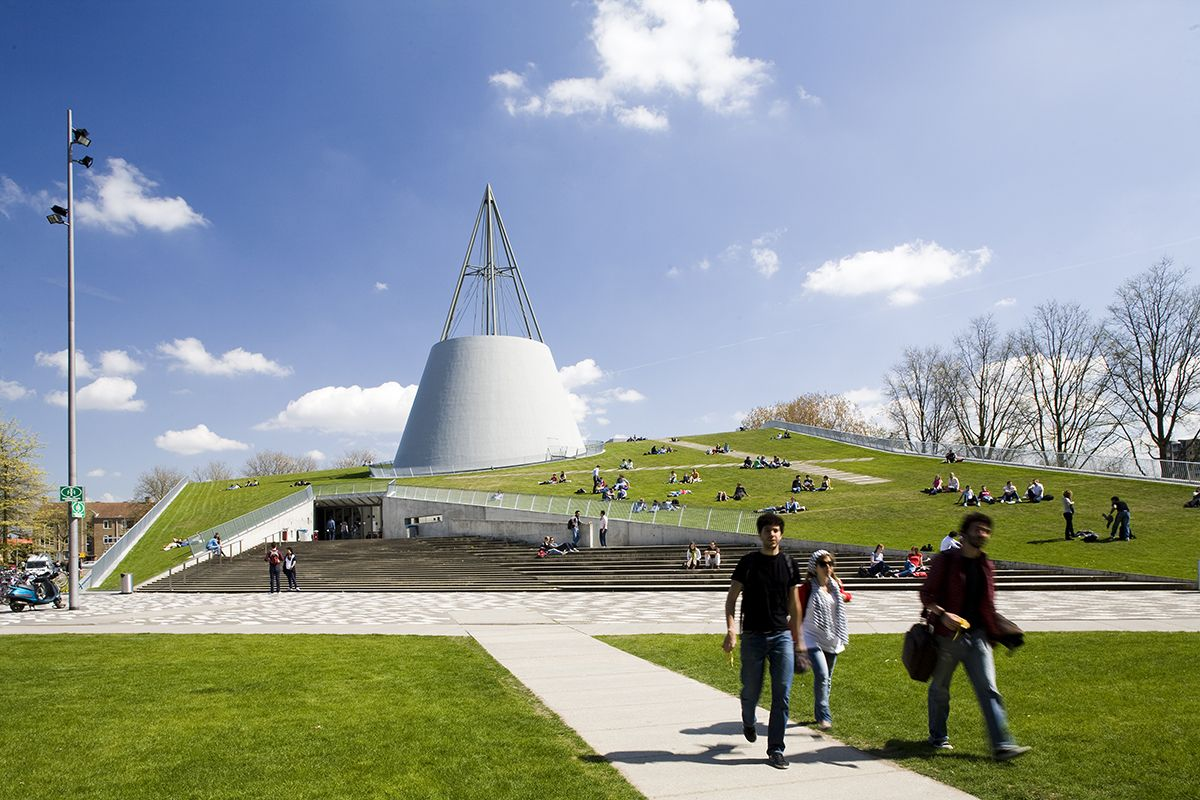
Delft University of Technology Library

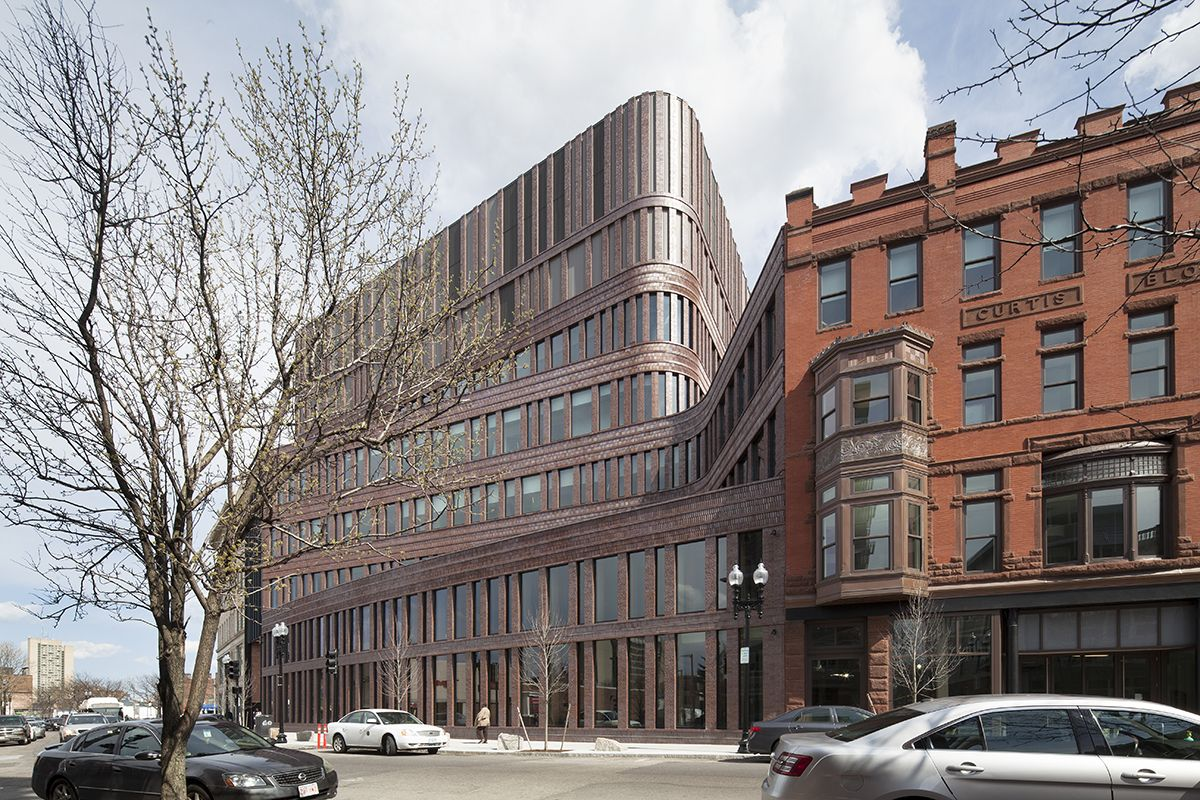
Bruce C. Bolling Municipal Building

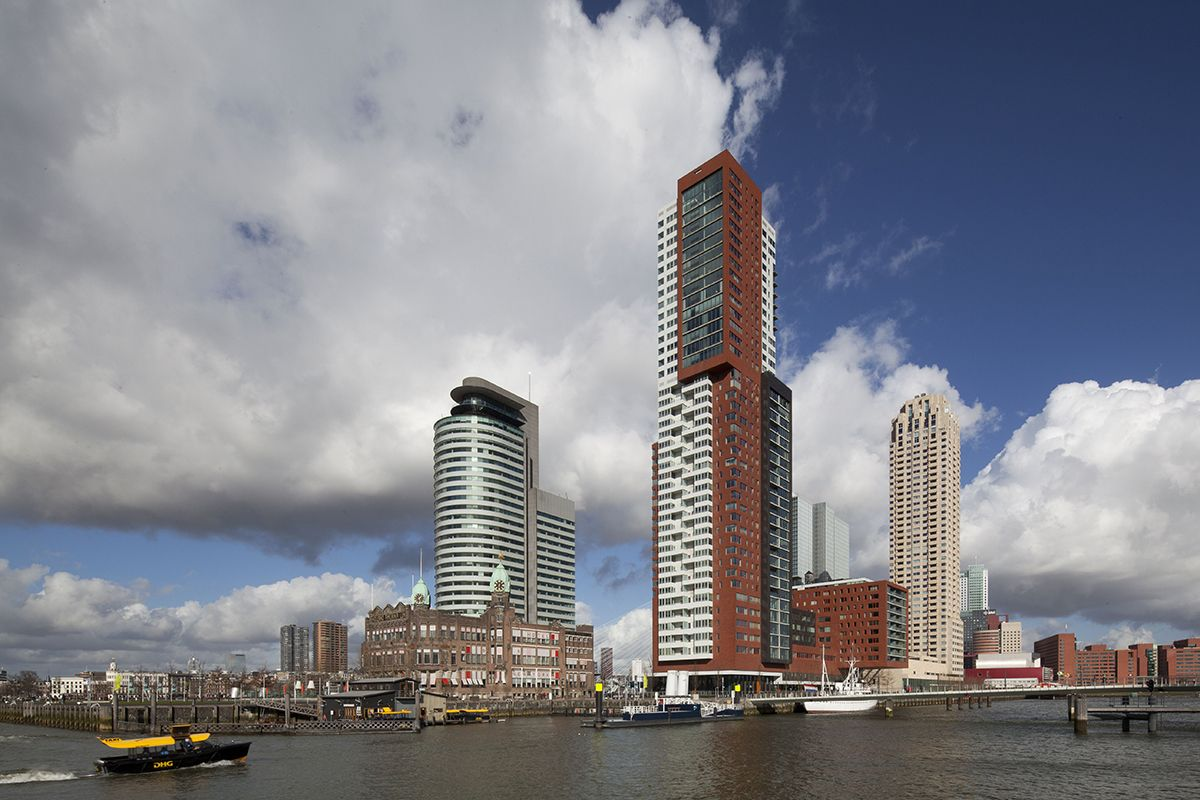
Montevideo Residential Tower

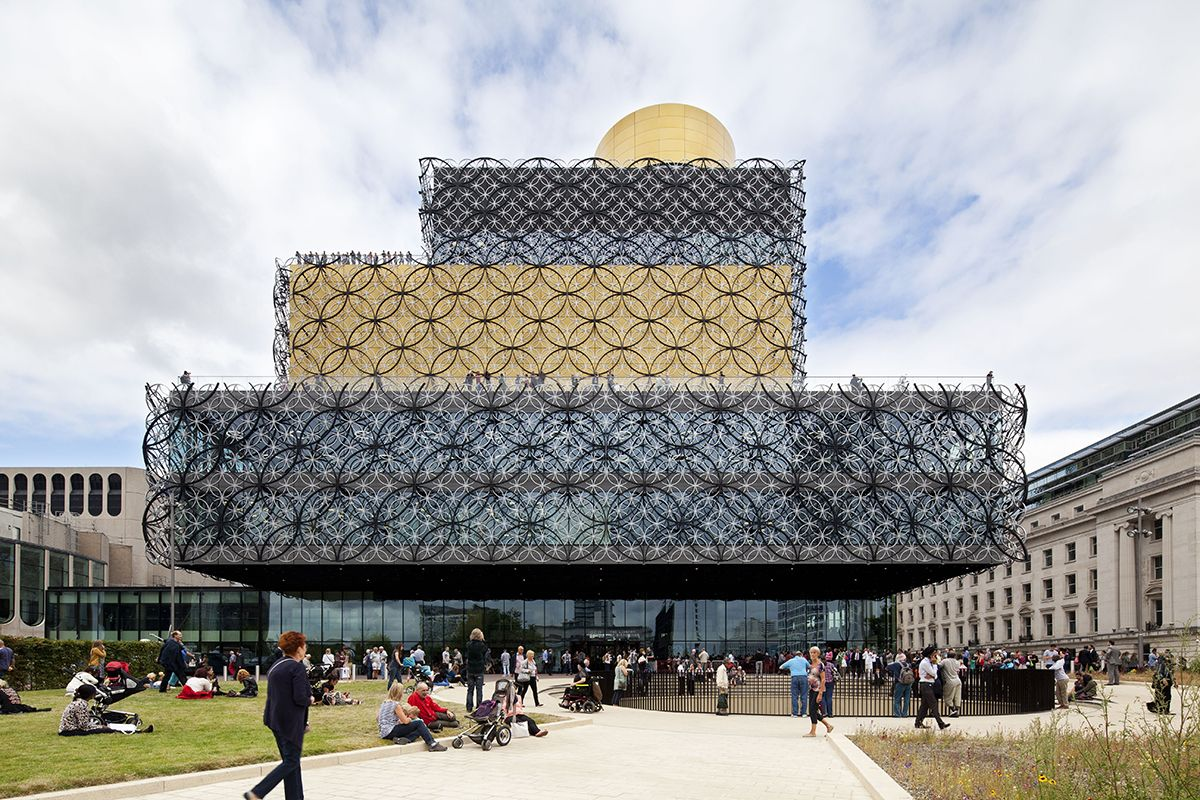
Library of Birmingham

- Faculty of Economics and Management, Utrecht (1995)
- Delft University of Technology Library, Delft (1997)
- Netherlands Open Air Museum, Arnhem (2000)
- Westergasfabriek Terrain, Amsterdam (2001)
- Masterplan Delft University of Technology (2002)
- Montevideo, Rotterdam (2005)
- FiftyTwoDegrees, Nijmegen (2007)
- La Llotja Theatre and Congress Centre, Lleida (2008)
- Amphion Theatre, Doetinchem (2009)
- Kaap Skil, Maritime and Beachcombers Museum, Texel (2011)
- Amsterdam University College, Amsterdam (2012)
- Library of Birmingham integrated with Birmingham Repertory Theatre, Birmingham (2013)
- HOME, Manchester (2015)
- Bruce C. Bolling Municipal Building, Boston (2015)
- Hilton Amsterdam Airport Schiphol, Amsterdam (2015)
- Taekwang Country Club Cafe, Gyeonggi-do, South Korea (2015)
- Municipal Offices and Train Station, Delft, The Netherlands (2015/2017)
- Keukenhof, Lisse, The Netherlands (2017)
- Namdaemun Office Building, Seoul, South Korea (2017)
- Eurojust (EU agency), The Hague, Netherlands (2017)
- Palace of Justice, Córdoba, Spain (2017)
- Shenzhen North Station Urban Design, Shenzhen (2017)
- National Kaohsiung Center for the Arts, Kaohsiung (2018)
- Three Cultural Centers & One Book Mall, Shenzhen (2018)
- LocHal Public Library, Tilburg (2019)
- Martin Luther King Jr. Memorial Library, Washington D.C. (2020)
- Tainan Public Library, Tainan (2021)
- Stavros Niarchos Foundation Library, New York (2021)
- KAMPUS, Manchester (2021)
- Manchester Engineering Campus Development, Manchester (2022)
- Kaohsiung Station, Kaohsiung (2025)
- Natural History Museum, Abu Dhabi (2025)
- New York Public Library Midtown renovation, New York (ongoing)
- European Investment Bank, Luxembourg (ongoing)

== Publications ==
- Houben, F., Vollaard, P., Waaijers, L., Mecanoo architecten, Bibliotheek Technische Universiteit Delft, Rotterdam 1998
- Houben, F., ‘Ingenieurskunst en mobiliteitsesthetiek’, in: Architectuur en de openbare ruimte, de dynamische delta 2, Ministry for Transport, Public Works and Water Management/ Mecanoo architecten, The Hague 1999
- Houben, F., Maliebaan, een huis om in te werken, Andersson Elffers Felix, Utrecht/ Mecanoo architecten, Delft 2000
- Houben, F., Composition, Contrast, Complexity, NAi Publishers, Rotterdam 2001 / Birkhaüser, Basel, Boston, Berlin 2001
- Mecanoo, TU Delft Vastgoed, ING Vastgoed, TU Delft Masterplan, DUP Satellite, Delft 2002
- Houben, F., Calabrese, L. M. (ed.), Mobility, A Room with a View, Rotterdam 2003
- Mecanoo, Holland Avenue, Research Road Atlas; Holland Avenue, Design Road Atlas, Ministry for Transport, Public Works and Water Management, The Hague 2003
- Houben F., Luyn S.D.B., Mgr. A.H. van, Adrichem, J. van, Rooy, M. van, En het eeuwige licht verlichte haar, Kapel Heilige Maria der Engelen, Rotterdam 2004
- Brouwers, R., Betsky, A, Mecanoo, Masters of Architecture Series, Images Publishing Group, Mulgrave, Victoria, Australia, 2008
- Houben, F., Tromp, J., Cock, H., Dutch Mountains, Uitgeverij de Kunst, Wezep, Nederland, 2011
- Mecanoo, A People's Palace, The Library of Birmingham, Aedes Architecture Forum, Berlin, Germany, 2014
- Mecanoo, Houben, F. Mecanoo: People, Place, Purpose, Artifice books on architecture, London, United Kingdom, 2015

== Exhibitions ==
- 1999 Mecanoo, Opere e progretti, Pinacoteca Civica, Como
- 1999 Mecanoo Blue, 4a Bienal Internacional de Arquitectura, São Paulo
- 2001 Mecanoo architects, Composition, Contrast, Complexity, Netherlands Architecture Institute, Rotterdam
- 2002 Next, 8th International Exhibition of Architecture, Venice
- 2002 Works in progress, GA Gallery, Tokyo
- 2003 Grattacieli all’Orizzonte/Skyscrapers on the Skyline, Galleria Vittorio Emanuele, Urban Center of the Municipality of Milan
- 2003 1st International Architecture Biennal Rotterdam, Netherlands Architecture Institute, Rotterdam
- 2006 British Pavilion, 10th International Architecture Biennale, Venice
- 2007 Dutch Mountains, Casa CASLa, Almere
- 2007 3rd International Architecture Biennal Rotterdam, Kunsthal, Rotterdam
- 2007 Dutch Design Expo, International Creative Industry Week, Shanghai
- 2008 Mecanoo: Dutch Mountains, 101 Building, Taipei
- 2008 Pavilion A Piece of Banyan, Interni/Green Energy Design, Milano Capitale del Design 2008, Milan
- 2014 A People’s Palace, Aedes Architecture Forum, Berlin
- 2015 Mecanoo Photo Exhibition, American Institute of Architects, Washington D.C.
- 2016 Mecanoo: People, Place, Purpose Theater De Vest/Architectuur Informatiecentrum Alkmaar, Alkmaar
- 2017 Kaohsiung Station 2023, Kaohsiung, Taiwan
