= Francine Houben =

Dutch architect

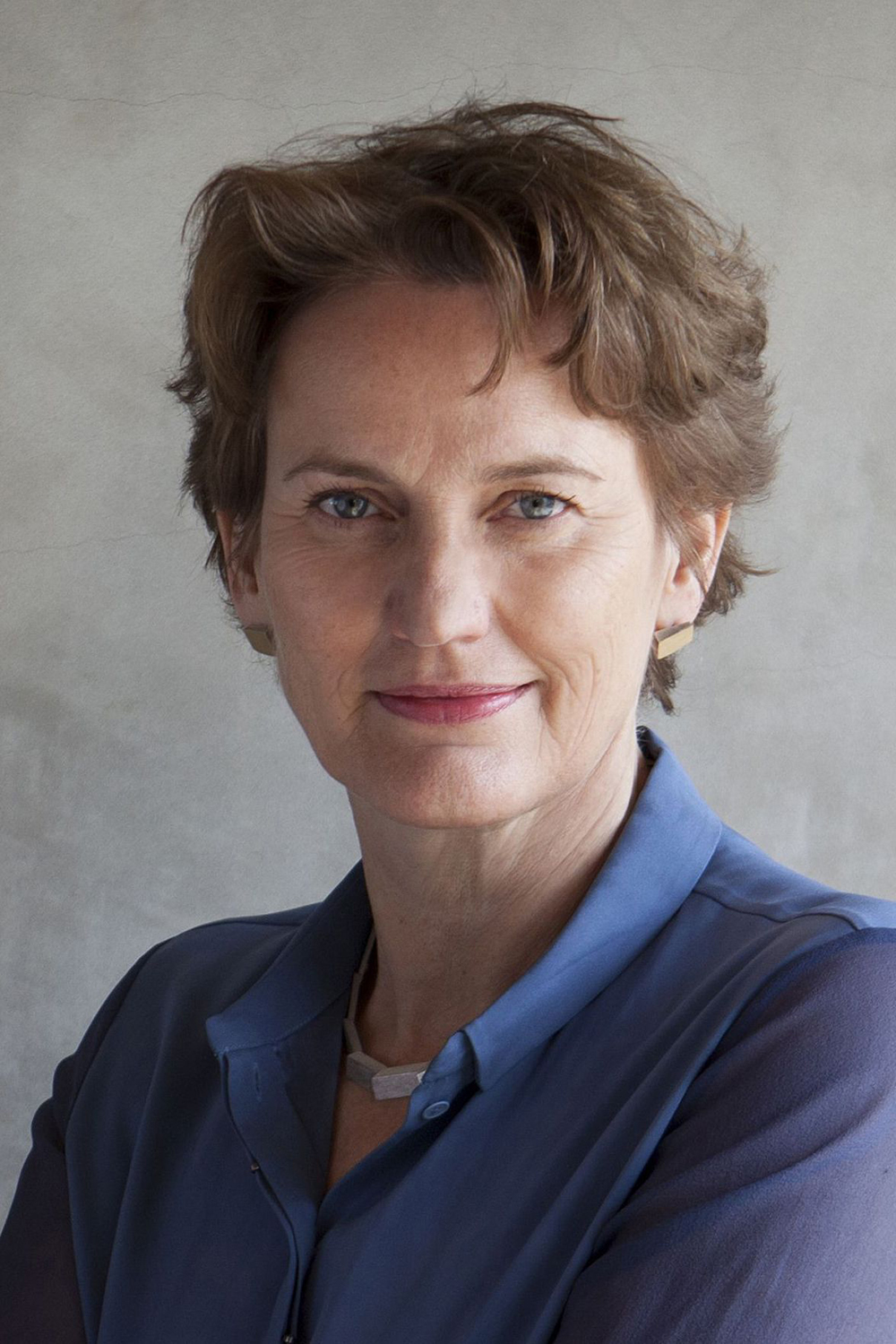
- Francine Houben, 2015.
- Born: Francine Marie Jeanne Houben; 2 July 1955 (age 71); Sittard, Netherlands
- Education: Faculty of Architecture, Delft University of Technology
- Occupation: Architect
- Practice: Mecanoo
- Buildings: Library of Birmingham, Delft University of Technology Library, Revitalisation Martin Luther King Jr. Memorial Library, Amsterdam University College, Delft Railway Station and Municipal Offices, HOME Arts Centre, La Llotja de Lleida, Montevideo Residential Tower, National Kaohsiung Center for the Arts.
- Projects: 1st Edition International Architecture Biennal Rotterdam

Francine Marie Jeanne Houben (Dutch pronunciation: [frɑnˈsinə maːˈri ˈʑɑnə ˈɦʌubə(n)]; born 2 July 1955) is a Dutch architect. She graduated with cum laude honours from the Delft University of Technology. She is a founding partner and creative director of Mecanoo architecten, based in Delft, The Netherlands.

== Work ==
The oeuvre of Houben's architecture is wide-ranging and includes projects such as universities, libraries, theatres, residential areas, museums and hotels. Houben combines the disciplines of architecture, urban planning and landscape architecture. According to her biography on her firm's website, she "bases her work on precise analysis coupled with an intuition built over three decades [by interweaving] social, technical, playful and human aspects of space-making together in order to create a unique solution to each architectural challenge." Francine strives to design architecture that appeals "to all the senses" and states that "[architecture] is never a (purely) intellectual, conceptual or a visual consideration alone. Architecture is about combining all of the individual elements into a single concept. In the end, what counts is the arrangement of form and emotion. Architecture should touch all the senses." Houben focuses on designing wholesome buildings that cover a large variety of project programs.

Her practice is particularly known for the design of libraries. The library at the Delft University of Technology, completed in 1997, led to the Library of Birmingham in 2013, and the current refurbishment of the Martin Luther King Jr. Memorial Library in Washington, D.C., and the New York Public Library Midtown renovation (Mid-Manhattan Library and the Stephen A. Schwarzman Building), New York. She has spoken extensively on libraries and public buildings, stating that "libraries are the most important public buildings, like cathedrals were many years ago". She has gained international acclaim for her works, both architecture and written. Her most recent building being the Library of Birmingham (2013), which was one of six buildings shortlisted for the 2014 Stirling Prize awarded by the Royal Institute of British Architects (RIBA). When Architects' Journal named her as 2014 Woman Architect of the Year, Houben stated: "It was a great privilege to design the Library of Birmingham. Architecture is about teamwork, about being supportive and visionary at the same time. Women are especially good at that."

Francine Houben has held professorships in the Netherlands and abroad, and in 2007 was visiting professor at Harvard University. From 2002 to 2006 she was City Architect of Almere. In 2001, she published her seminal manifesto about architecture: 'Composition, Contrast, Complexity' and brought as curator of the First International Architecture Biennale Rotterdam in 2003, the theme of the aesthetics of mobility to the forefront of international design consciousness. In 2010 Francine Houben was granted lifelong membership to the Akademie der Künste, Architecture Department, in Berlin. In November 2015 Queen Máxima of the Netherlands presented the Prins Bernhard Cultuurfonds Prize to Houben for her oeuvre. Francine has published books and traveled to numerous universities giving lectures on her studies and practice. Her most recent synopsis is "People, place, purpose, poetry: through these four words Francine Houben illustrates her practice's unique, humanistic approach to architecture."

== Selected projects ==
- Faculty of Economics and Management, Utrecht (1995)
- TU Delft Library, Delft (1997)
- Netherlands Open Air Museum, Arnhem (2000)
- Westergasfabriek Terrain, Amsterdam (2001)
- Masterplan Delft University of Technology (2002)
- Montevideo, Rotterdam (2005)
- FiftyTwoDegrees, Nijmegen (2007)
- La Llotja Theatre and Congress Centre, Lleida (2008)
- Amphion Theatre, Doetinchem (2009)
- Kaap Skil, Maritime and Beachcombers Museum, Texel (2012)
- Amsterdam University College, Amsterdam (2012)
- Library of Birmingham integrated with Birmingham Repertory Theatre, Birmingham (2013)
- HOME, Manchester (2015)
- Bruce C. Bolling Municipal Building, Boston (2015)
- Hilton Amsterdam Airport Schiphol, Amsterdam (2015)
- Taekwang Country Club Cafe, Gyeonggi-do, South Korea (2015)
- Municipal Offices and Train Station, Delft, The Netherlands (2015/2017)
- Keukenhof, Lisse, The Netherlands (2017)
- Namdaemun Office Building, Seoul, South Korea (2017)
- Eurojust (EU agency), The Hague, Netherlands (2017)
- Palace of Justice, Córdoba, Spain (2017)
- National Kaohsiung Center for the Arts, Kaohsiung (2018)
- Three Cultural Centers & One Book Mall, Shenzhen (2018)
- Manchester Engineering Campus Development, Manchester (ongoing)
- Martin Luther King Jr. Memorial Library renovation, Washington, D.C. (ongoing)
- European Investment Bank, Luxembourg (ongoing)
- Kaohsiung Station, Kaohsiung (ongoing)
- New York Public Library Midtown renovation, New York (ongoing)
- Shenzhen North Station Urban Design, Shenzhen (ongoing)
- Tainan Public Library, Tainan (ongoing)
- Natural History Museum, Abu Dhabi (ongoing)

== Gallery ==
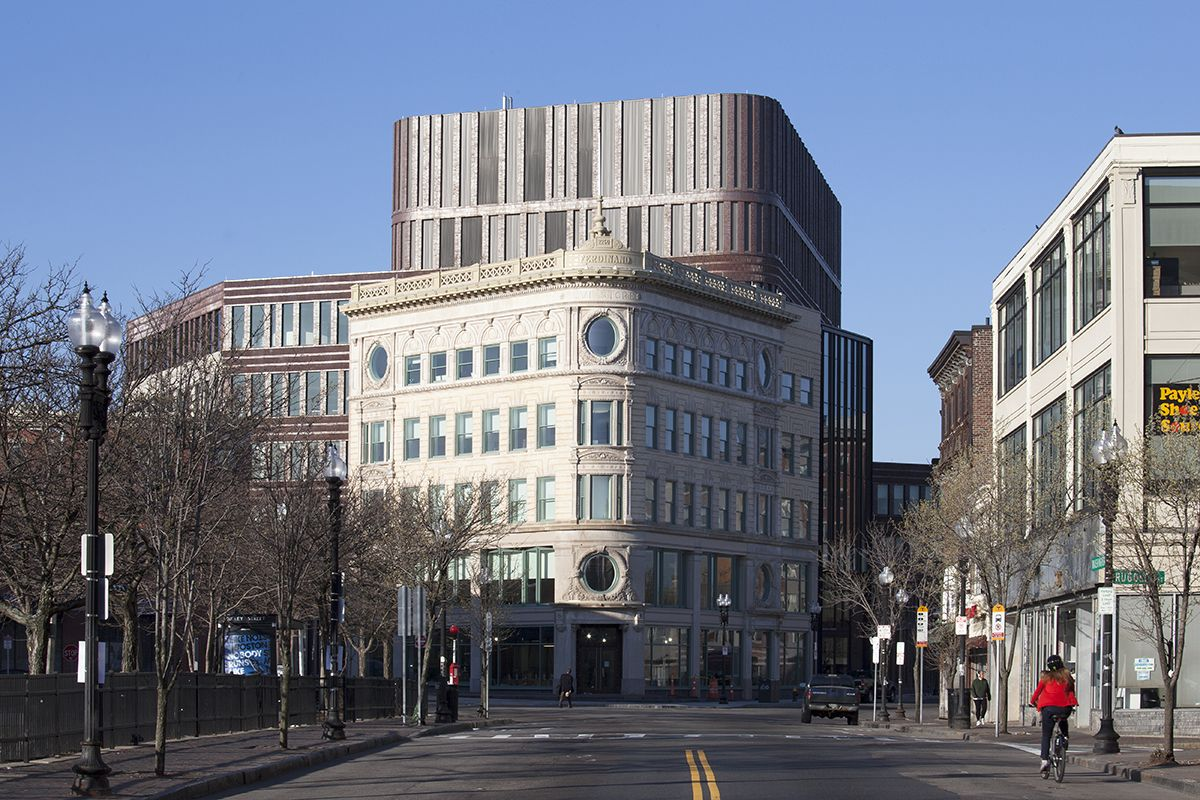
Bruce C. Bolling Municipal Building
Boston, US

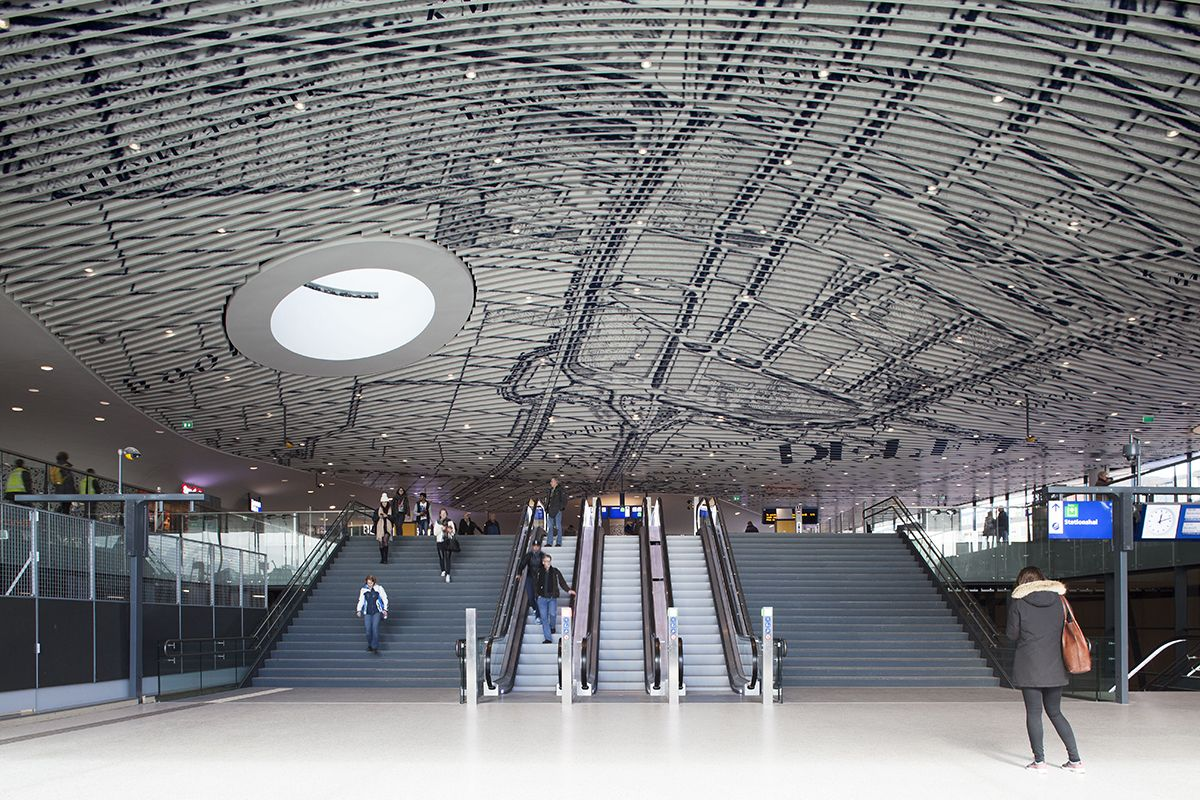
Municipal Offices and Train Station
Delft, Netherlands

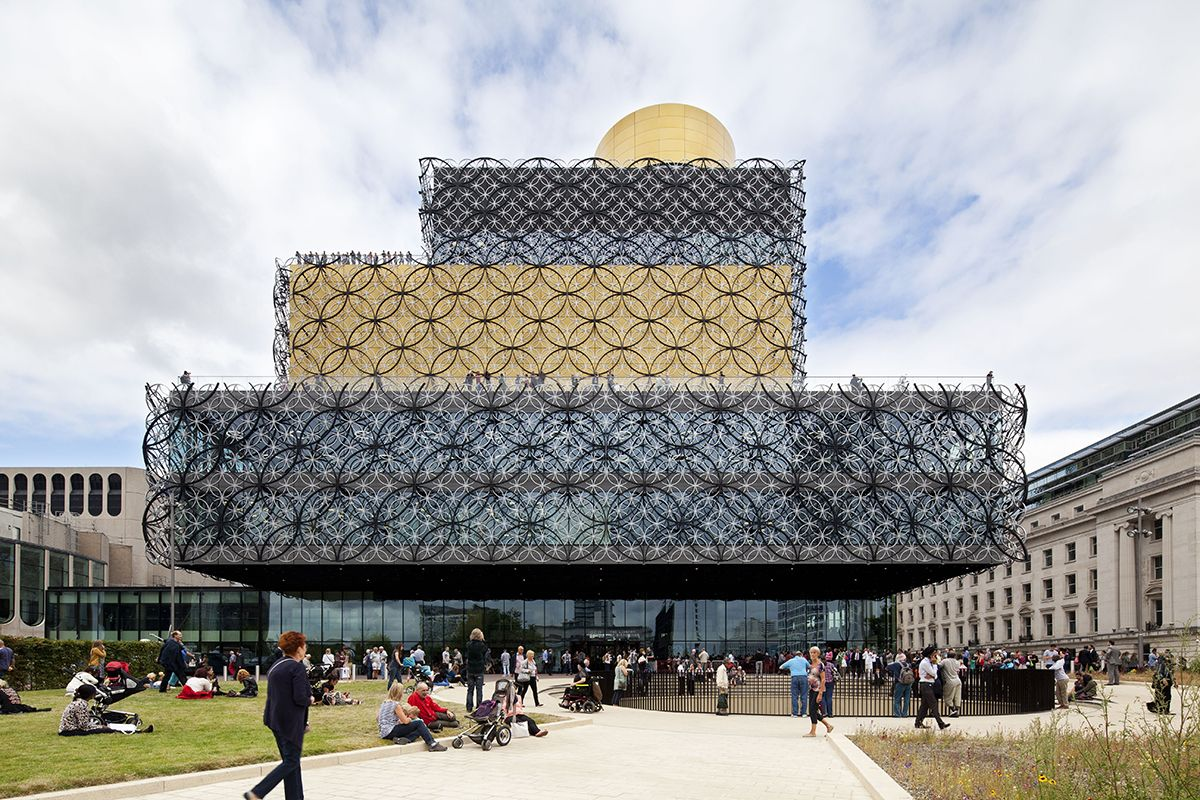
Library of Birmingham
Birmingham, UK

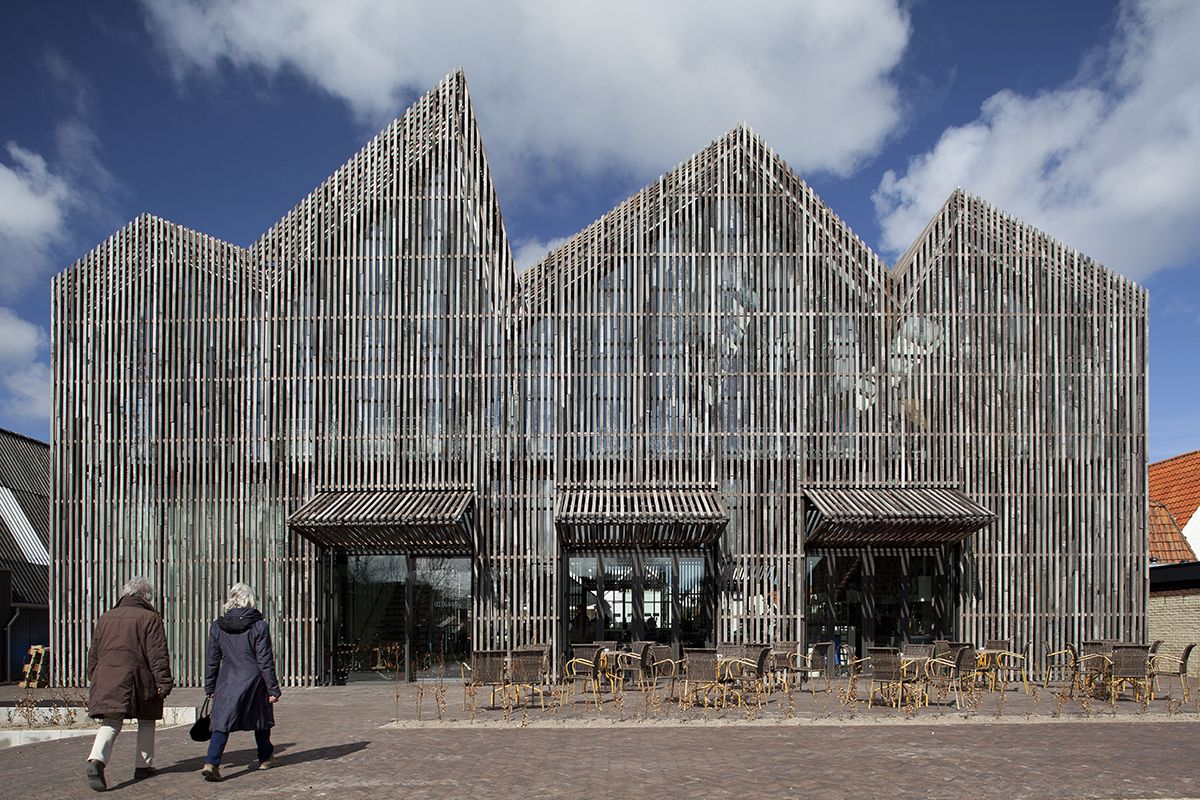
Kaap Skil, Maritime and Beachcombers Museum
Oudeschild, Netherlands

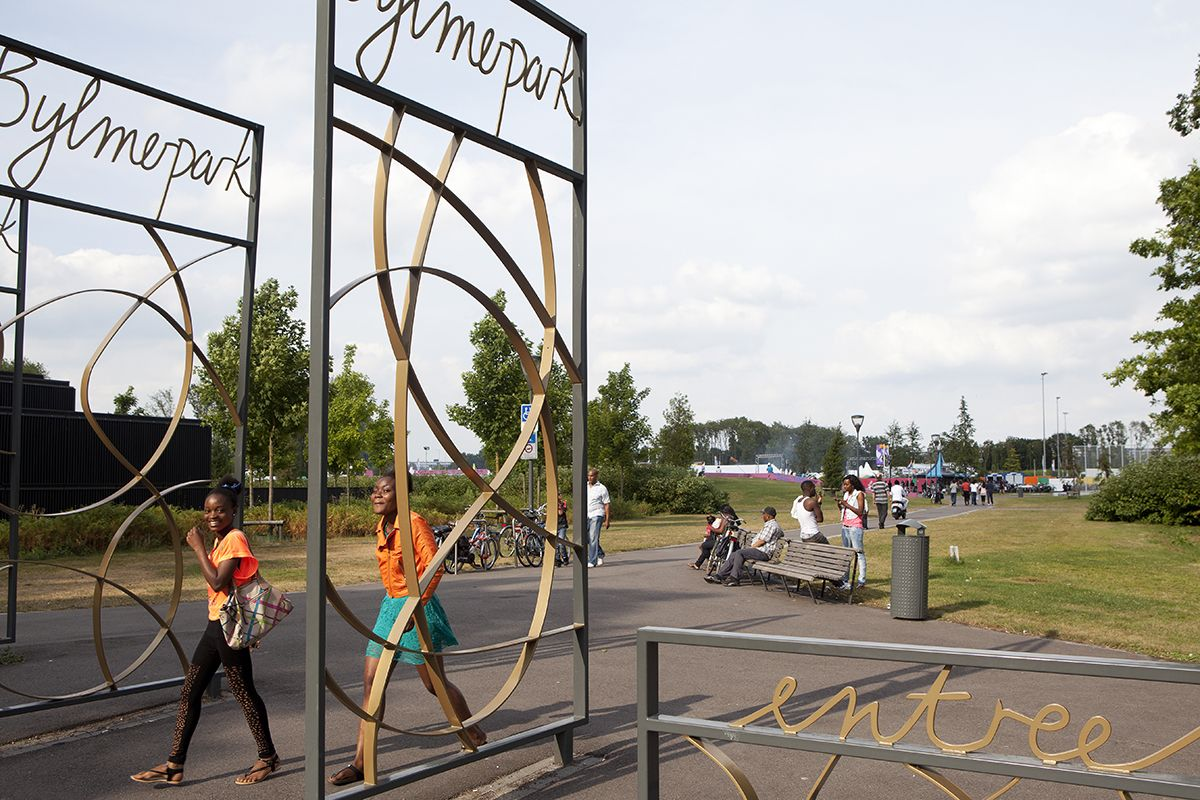
Nelson Mandela Park
Amsterdam-Zuidoost, Netherlands

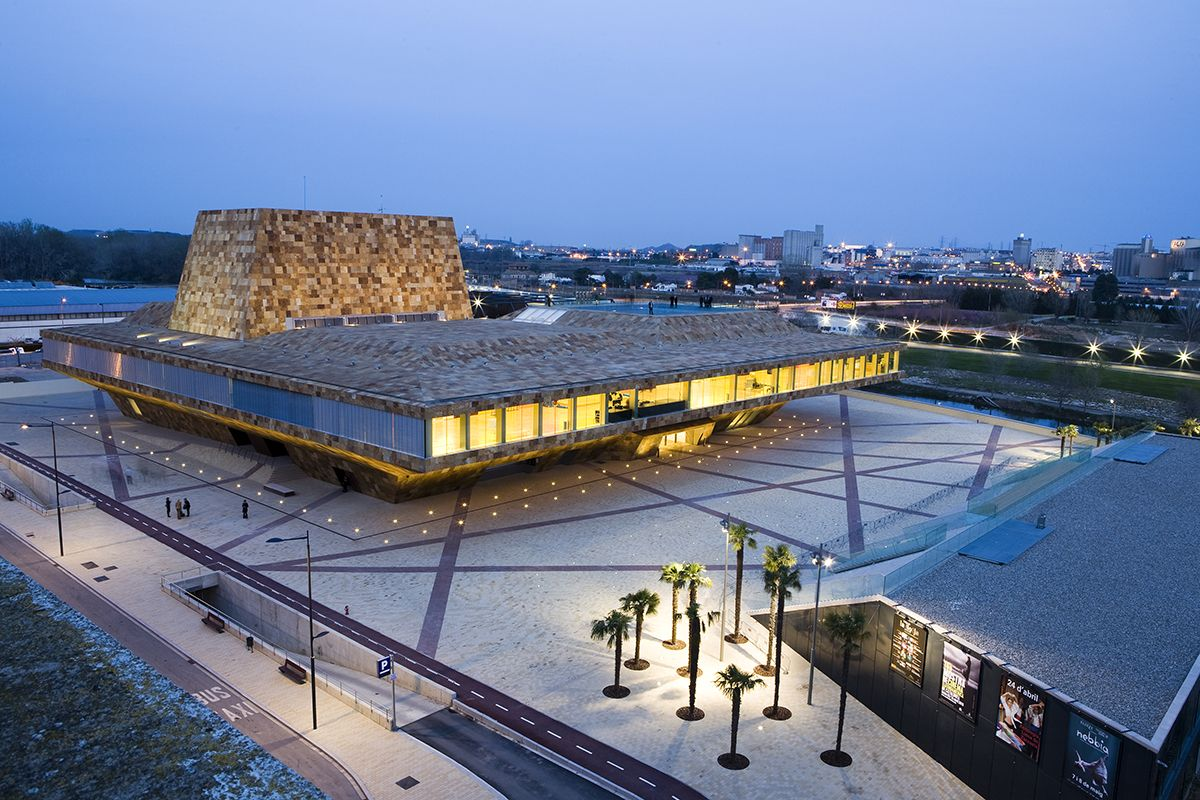
La Llotja Theatre and Conference Centre
Lleida, Spain

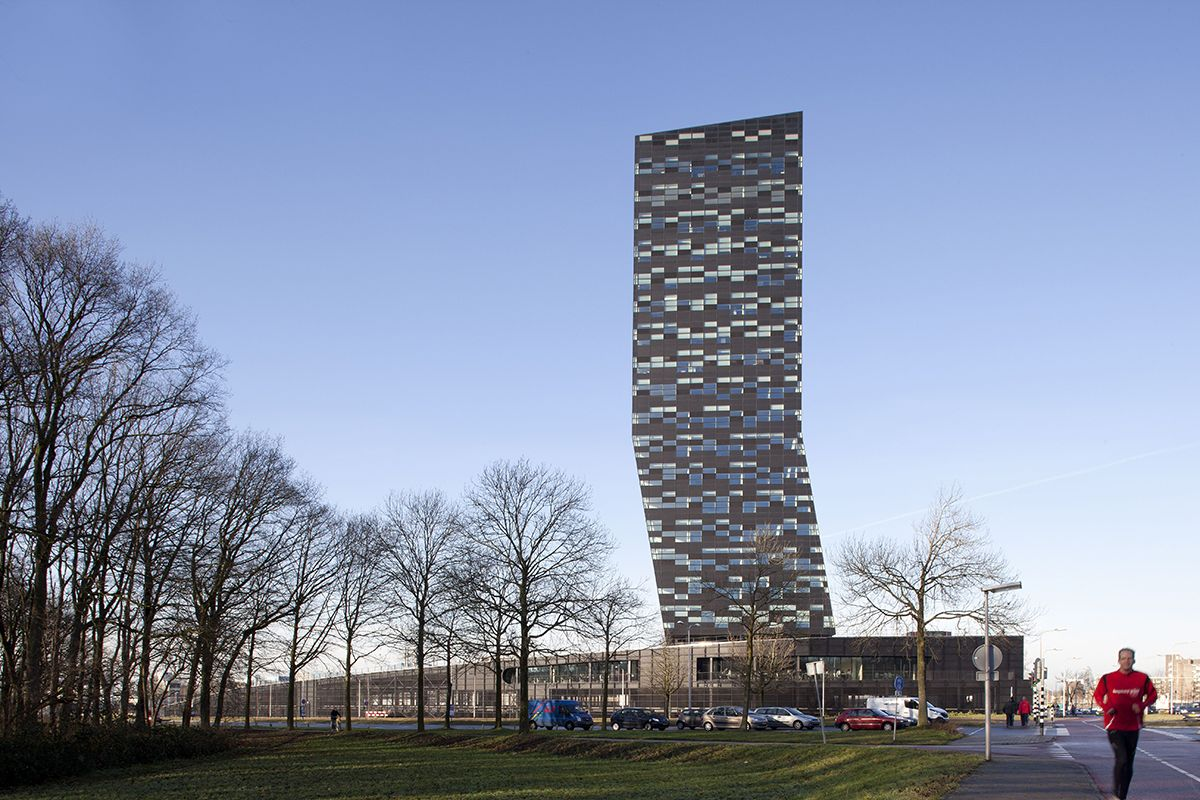
FiftyTwoDegrees
Nijmegen, Netherlands

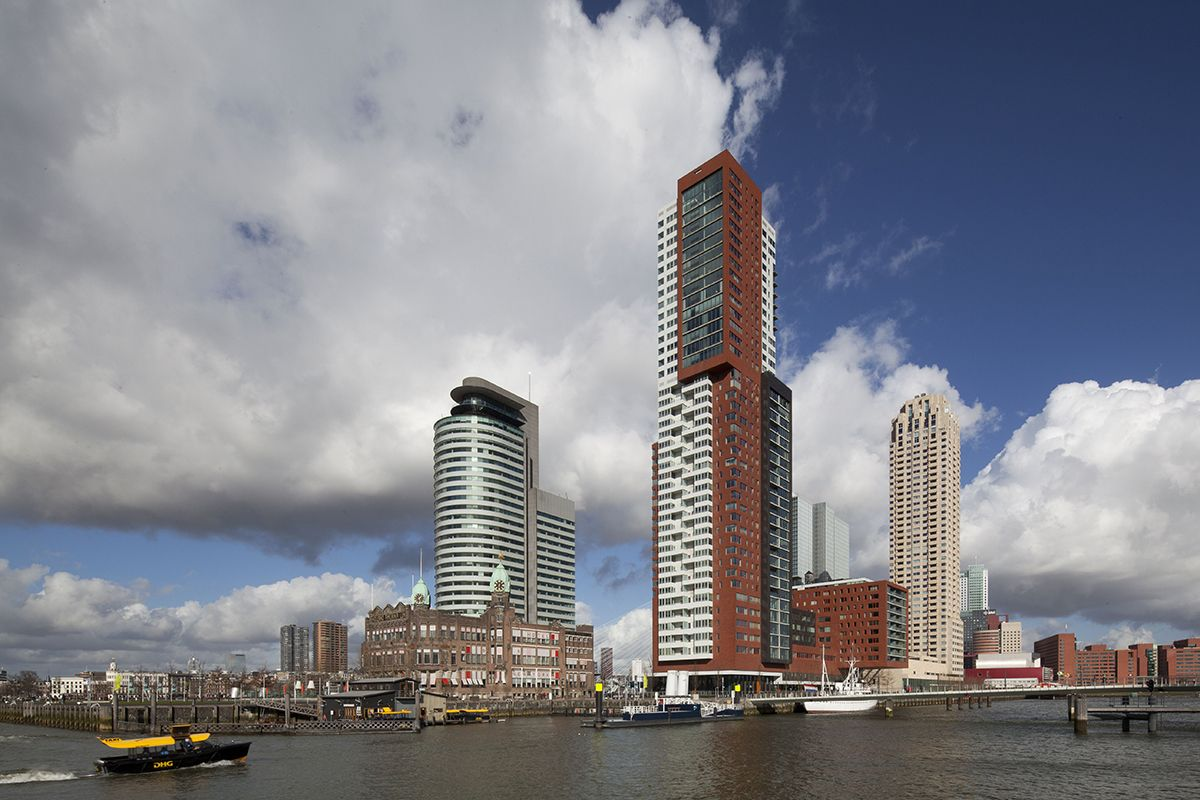
Montevideo Residential Tower
Rotterdam, Netherlands

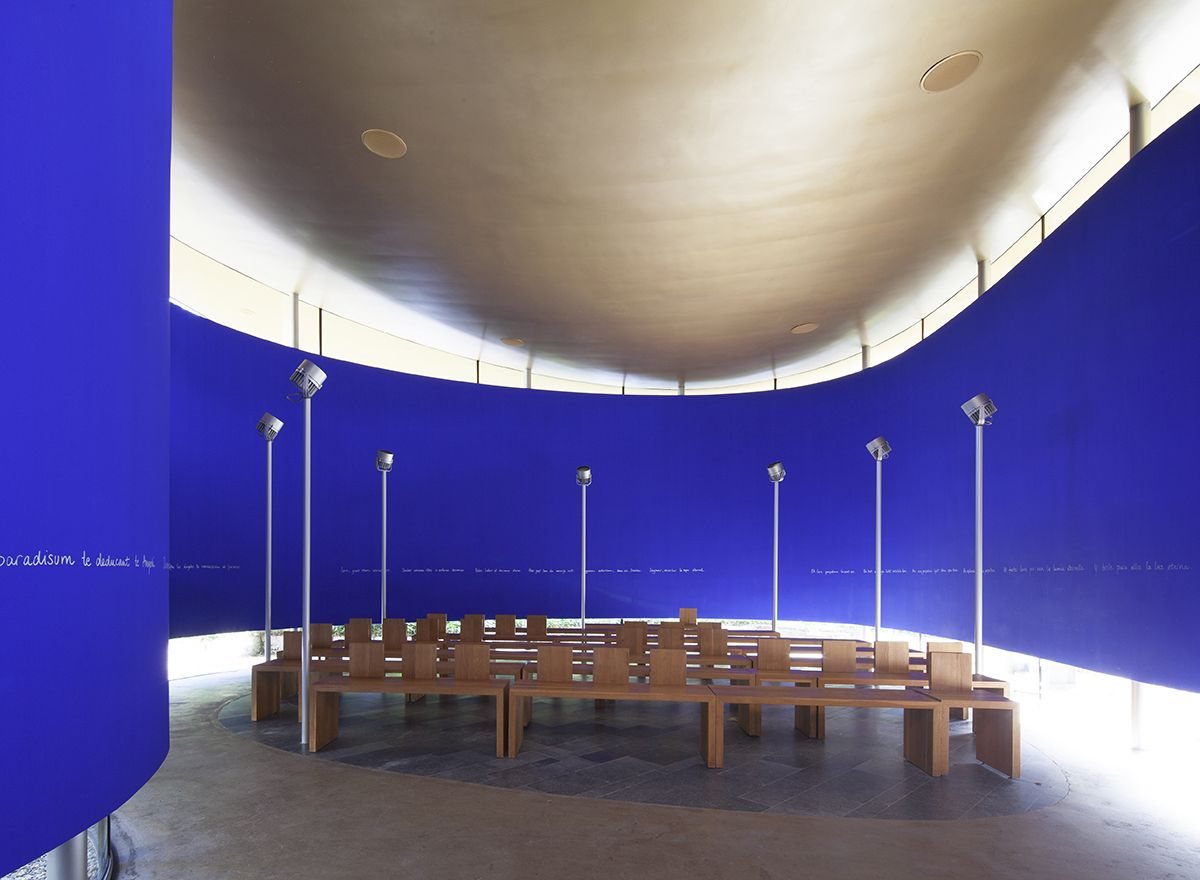
Chapel Saint Mary of the Angels
Rotterdam, Netherlands

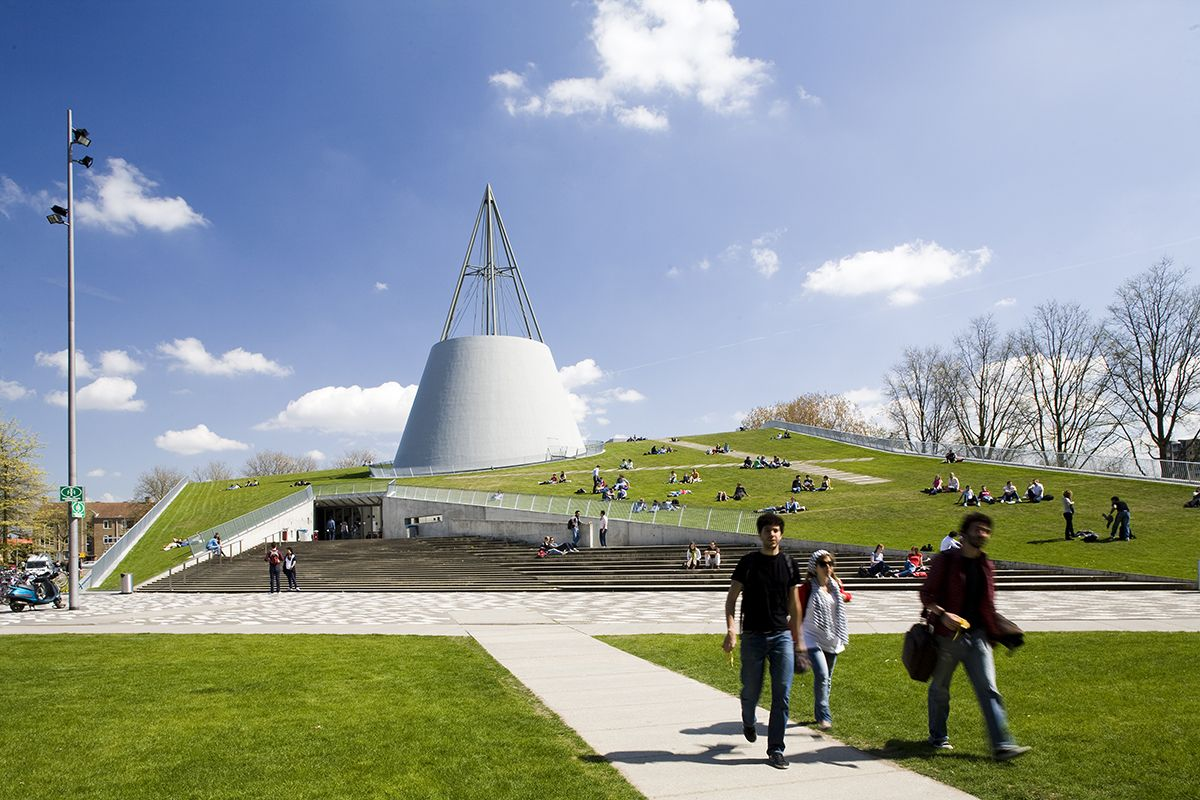
Delft University of Technology Library
Delft, Netherlands

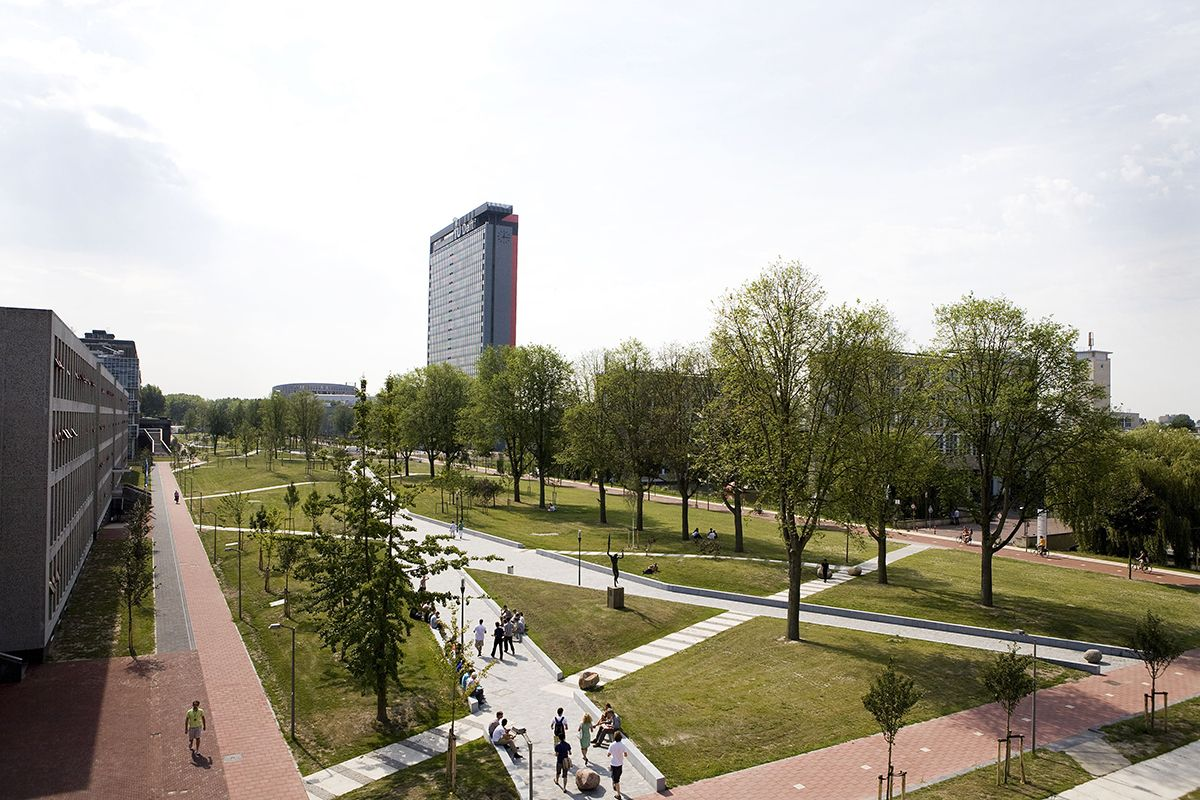
Mekel Park, Delft University of Technology
Delft, Netherlands

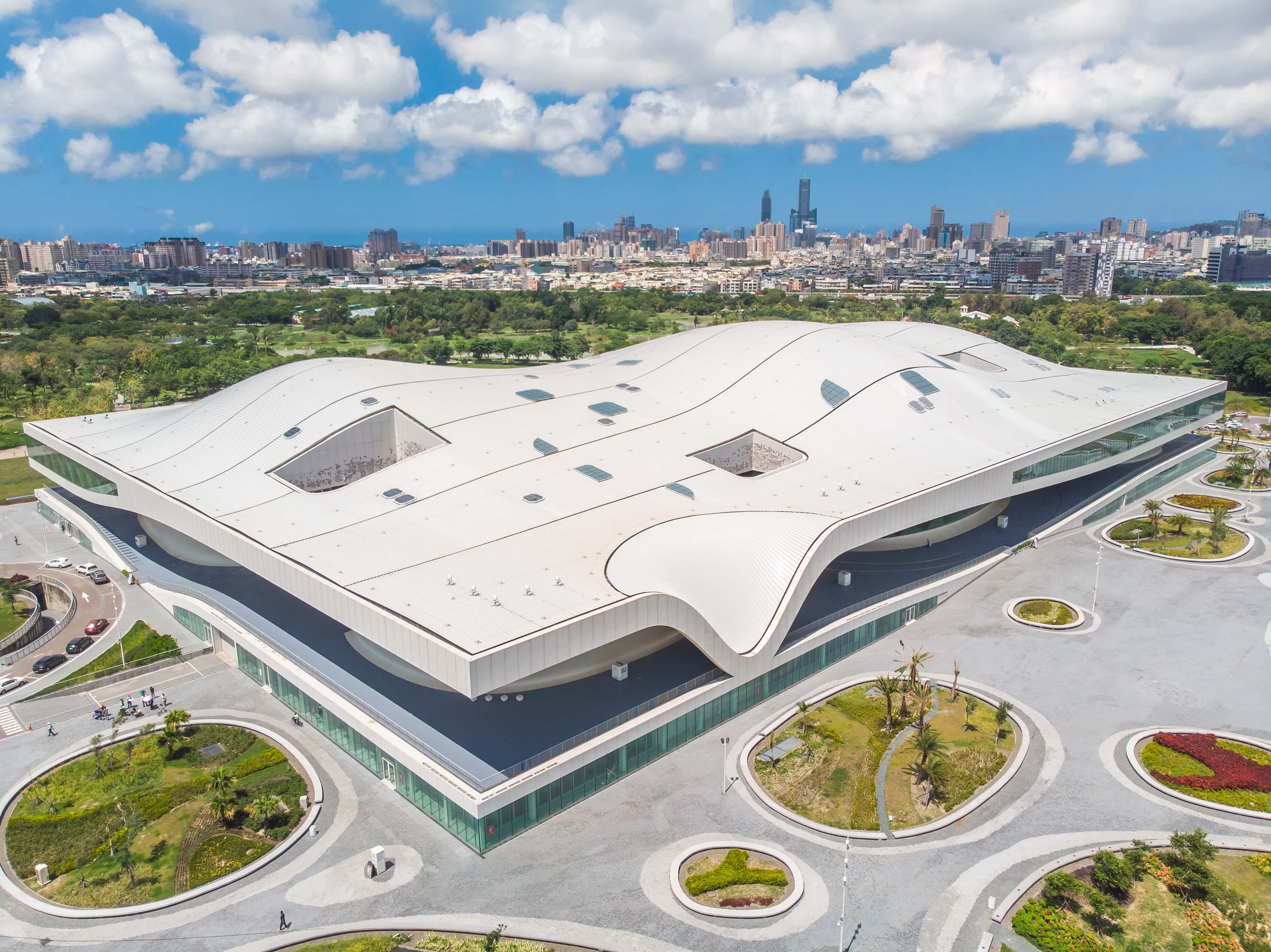
National Kaohsiung Center for the Arts (Weiwuying)
Kaohsiung, Taiwan

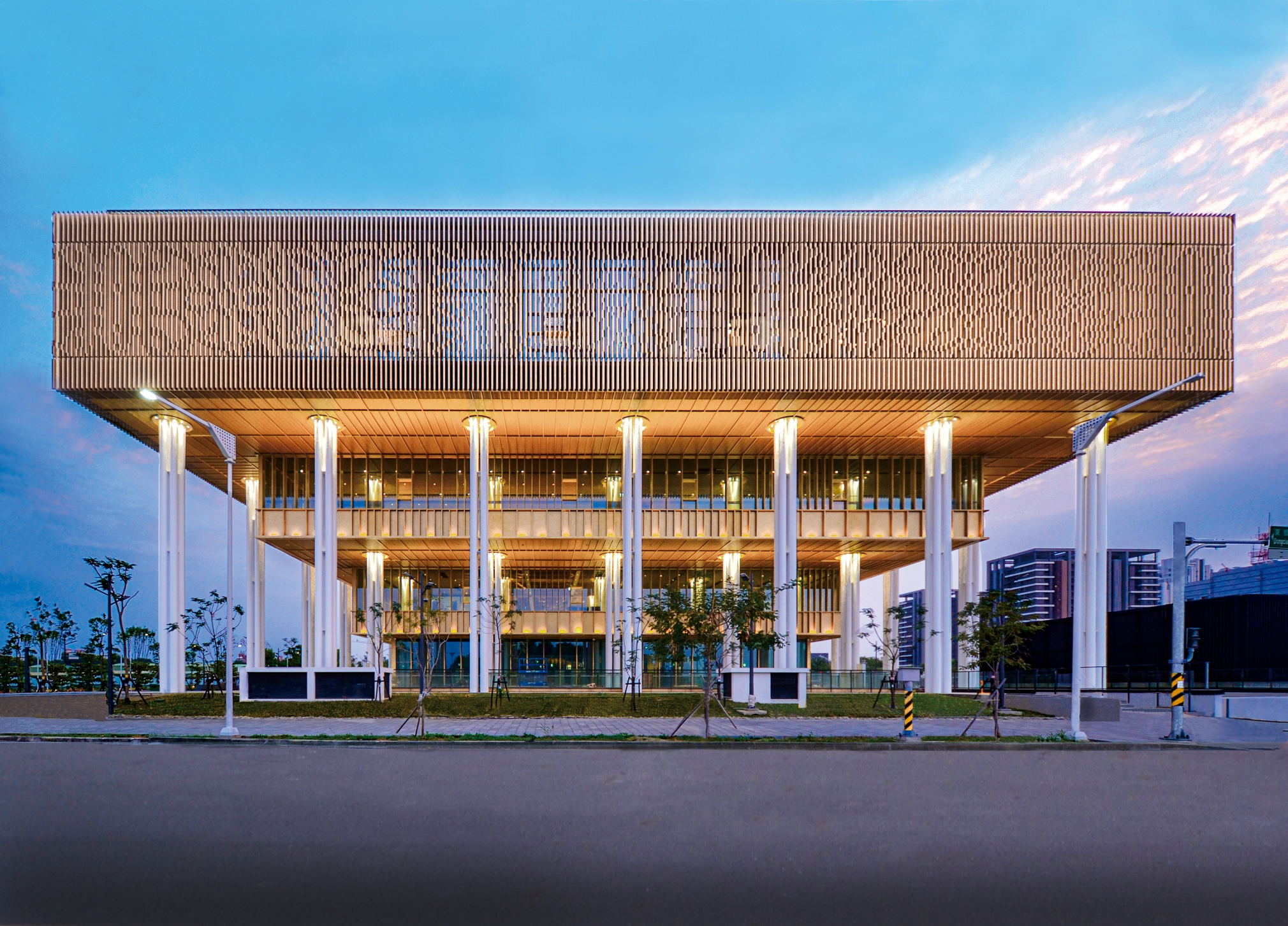
Tainan Public Library
Tainan, Taiwan

== Selected awards and honours ==
- 2001 Honorary Fellowship, Royal Institute of British Architects
- 2007 Honorary Fellowship, Royal Architectural Institute of Canada
- 2007 Honorary Fellowship, American Institute of Architects
- 2008 Veuve Cliquot Business Women of the Year award
- 2014 Woman Architect of the Year, Architects' Journal
- 2015 Prins Bernhard Cultuurfonds Prize
- 2016 Honorary Doctorate, Utrecht University
- 2018 International Honorary Fellow Award, Architecture Institute of Taiwan

== Other functions ==
- 2015–present Board Member Society of Arts at Royal Netherlands Academy of Arts and Sciences
- 2015–present Member Van Alen Institute
- 2010–present Member Akademie der Künste, Architecture Department
- 2008–present Board Member Carnegie Foundation
- 2005–present Supervisory board Kröller-Müller Museum, Otterlo

== Bibliography ==
- People Place Purpose, Francine Houben. London: Black Dog Publishing, 2015 ISBN 978-1-908967-61-9
- Dutch Mountains, Francine Houben, Jan Tromp, Harry Cock. Wezep: Uitgeverij de Kunst, 2011 ISBN 978-94-91196-00-3
- Masters of Architecture Series, Mecanoo, Ruud Brouwer, Aaron Betsky, Francine Houben. Mulgrave, Vic.: Images Publishing Group, 2008 ISBN 978-1-86470-142-5
- En het eeuwige licht verlichte haar, Kapel Heilige Maria der Engelen, Francine Houben, Mgr. A.H. van Luyn S.D.B., Jan van Adrichem, Max van Rooy. Rotterdam, 2004
- Mobility, A Room with a View, Francine Houben, Louisa Maria Calabrese (ed.). Rotterdam: NAi Publishers, 2003 ISBN 90-5662-257-9
- Composition, Contrast, Complexity, Francine Houben. Basel, Boston, Berlin: Birkhäuser, 2001 ISBN 3-7643-6452-1 translated from Dutch Compositie, Contrast, Complexiteit, Francine Houben. Rotterdam: NAi Publishers, 2001 ISBN 90-5662-190-4
- Maliebaan, een huis om in te werken, Francine Houben. Utrecht: Andersson Elffers Felix/Delft: Mecanoo architecten, 2000 ISBN 90-90-13900-1
- Ingenieurskunst en mobiliteitsesthetiek, Francine Houben in: Architectuur en de openbare ruimte, de dynamische delta 2, Ministry for Transport, Public Works and Water Management/Mecanoo architecten. The Hague, 1999, OCLC 67757398
- Bibliotheek Technische Universiteit Delft, Leo Waaijers, Piet Vollaart, Francine Houben. Rotterdam: 010 Publishers, 1998 ISBN 90-6450-335-4
