= Montevideo (Rotterdam) =

43-storey, 139.5 m (458 ft) residential skyscraper in Rotterdam, The Netherlands

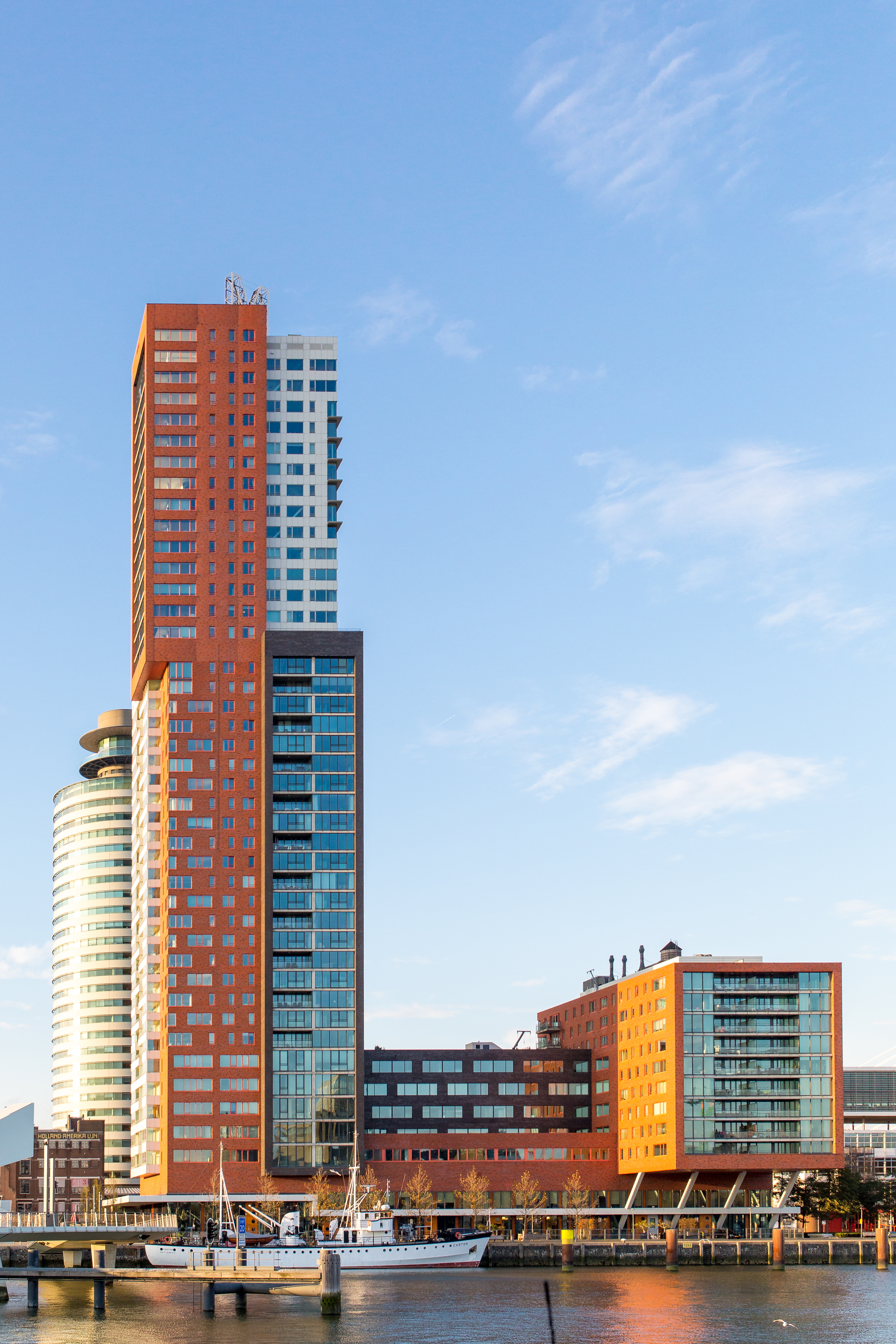
- Interactive map of the Montevideo area

General information
- Status: Completed
- Type: Residential
- Architectural style: Modernism
- Location: Landverhuizersplein 1-152; Rotterdam, Netherlands
- Coordinates: 51.90361°N 4.48556°E
- Completed: 2003 – 2005

Height
- Antenna spire: 152.3 m (500 ft)
- Roof: 139.5 m (458 ft)

Technical details
- Floor count: 43
- Floor area: 57,530 m^{2} (619,200 sq ft)
- Lifts/elevators: 7

Design and construction
- Architect: Mecanoo
- Developer: ING Real Estate Development
- Engineer: ABT Delft
- Main contractor: Besix

Other information
- Number of units: 192

Montevideo is a 43-storey, 139.5 m (458 ft) residential skyscraper on the river Nieuwe Maas in Rotterdam, The Netherlands. The Montevideo logo on the roof is an 8 by 8 m (26 by 26 ft) letter "M" which brings the tower's total height to 152.3 m (500 ft). The logo is also designed to be a giant wind vane. Designed by Mecanoo architecture firm principal, Francine Houben, the building is one of the tallest woman-designed buildings in the world. The tower was opened 19 December 2005, featuring 192 apartment units, 6,050 m^{2} (65,122 sq ft) of office space, and 1,933 m^{2} (20,807 sq ft) of retail space. The building is named after the Uruguay capital city, Montevideo.

== Awards ==
The building received a commendation award by the International Highrise Award 2006, and it has been awarded the Dedallo Minosse Prize. In addition it finished in third place in the 2005 Emporis Skyscraper Award selection.

== Gallery ==
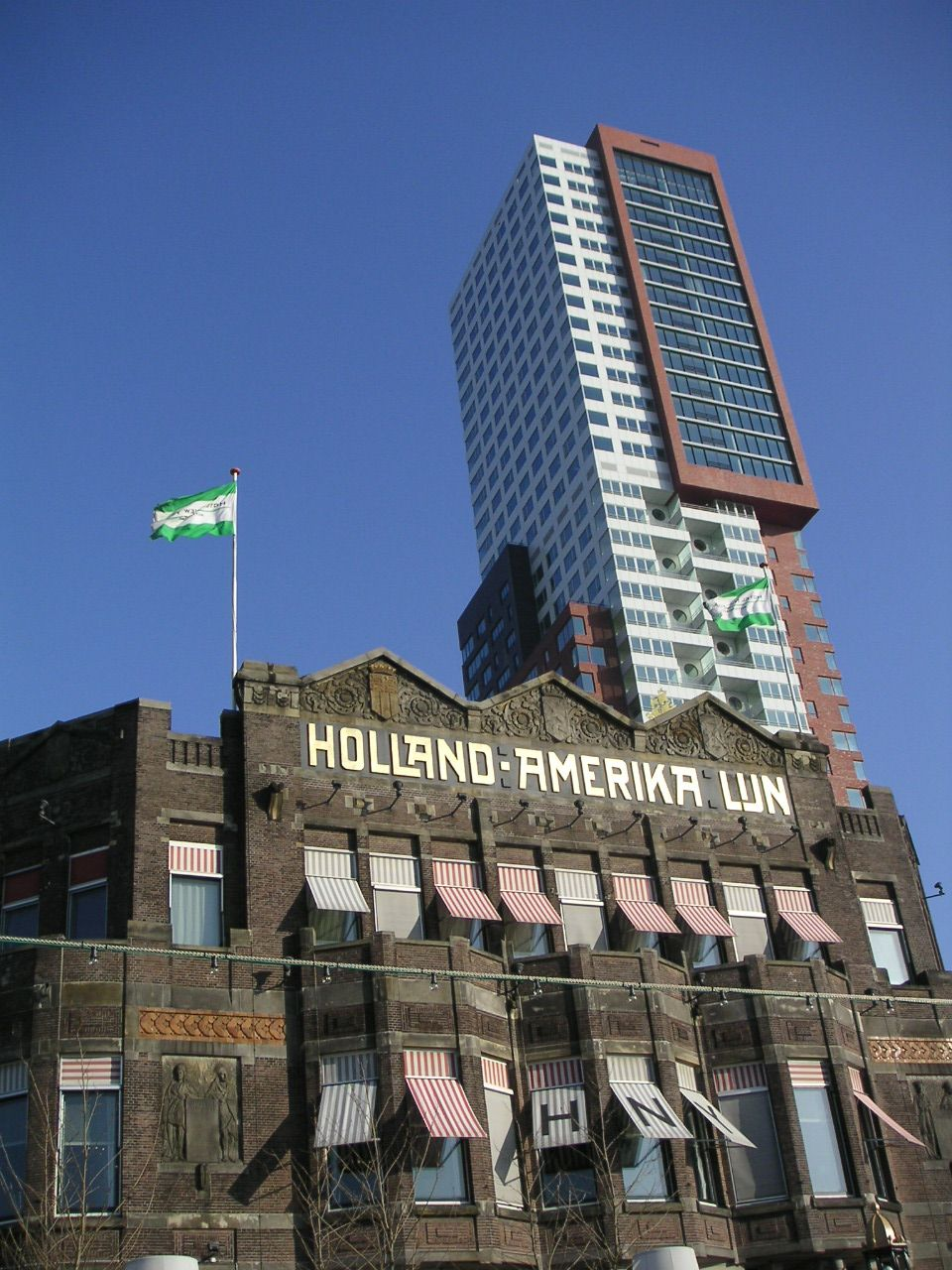
Montevideo behind the Holland America Line Hotel New York

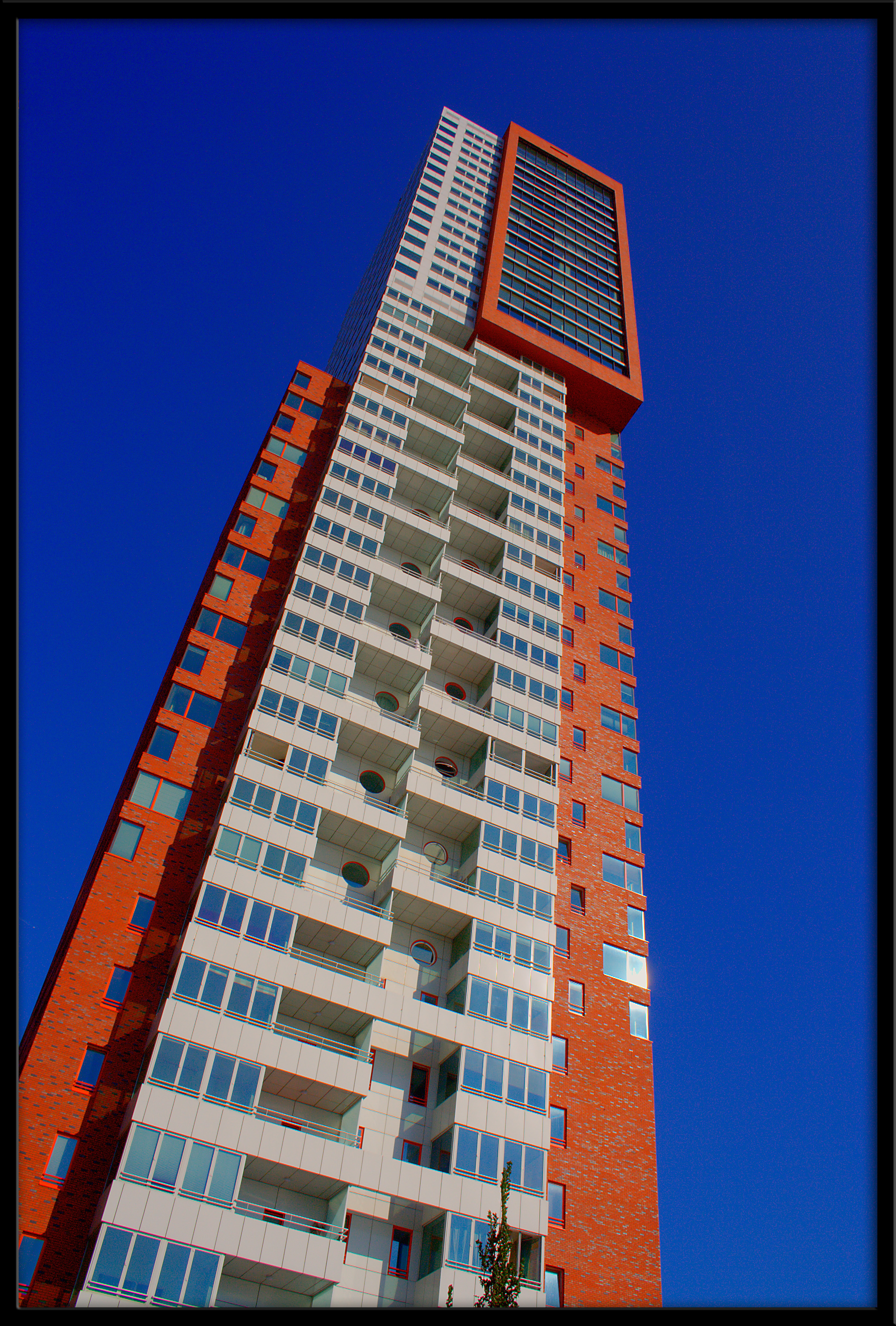
Montevideo

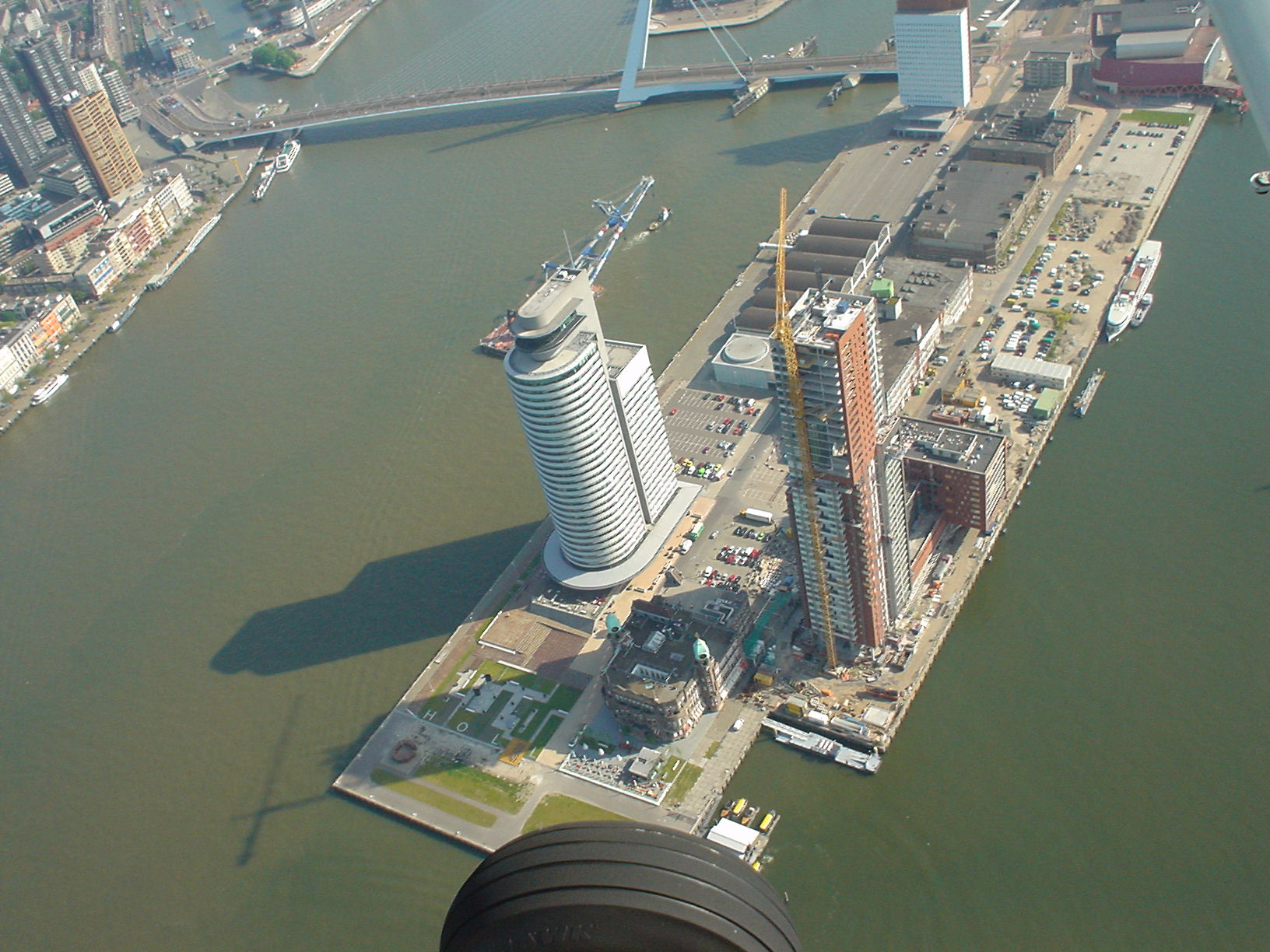
Montevideo Tower & World Port Center

== See also ==
Media related to Montevideo skyscraper at Wikimedia Commons
