= TU Delft Library =

Library in Delft, Netherlands

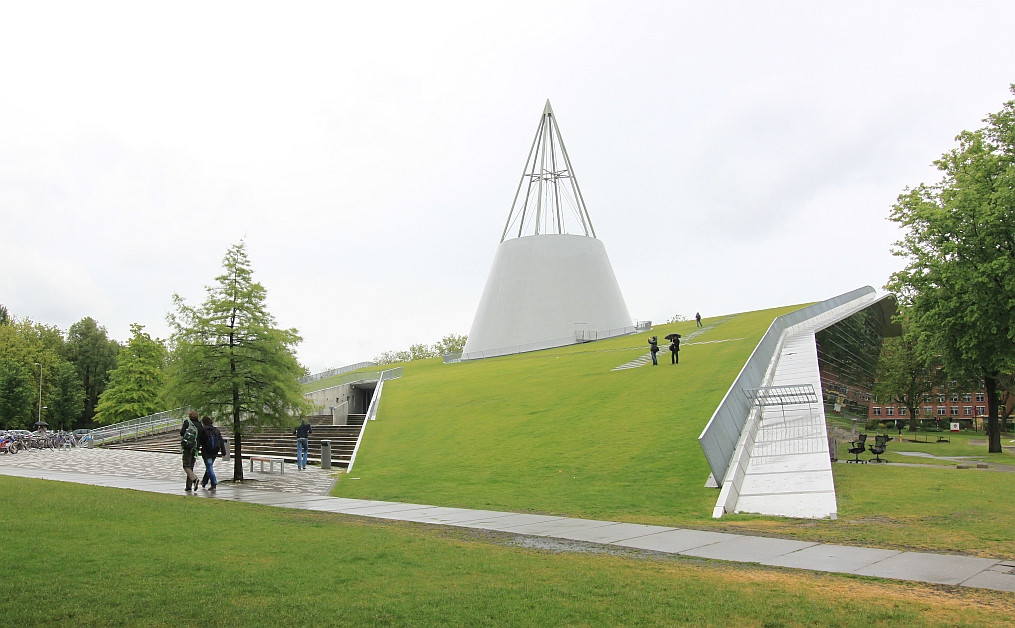

- Location within Netherlands

General information
- Type: Library
- Architectural style: Modernist
- Location: Prometheusplein 1, Delft, Netherlands
- Coordinates: 52°00′10″N 04°22′32″E
- Completed: 1997
- Owner: Delft University of Technology

Technical details
- Floor area: 15,000 square metres (160,000 sq ft)

Design and construction
- Architects: Erick van Egeraat; Francine Houben
- Structural engineer: Abt
- Awards: National Steel Construction Prize; Dutch Steel Building Institute 1998; Award for the Millennium; Corus Construction 2000

Website
- https://www.tudelft.nl/library/

The TU Delft Library is the main library of the Delft University of Technology (TU Delft), located in Delft, Netherlands. It was designed by the Dutch architecture firm Mecanoo and built in 1997. It is the largest technical scientific library in the Netherlands.

== Building ==
The library was designed in the early years of Mecanoo, whose founding members, Erick van Egeraat, Henk Döll, Francine Houben, Roelf Steenhuis and Chris de Weijer, were graduates of TU Delft. An example of a building that acts as landscape, the library is partially underground with a 15% sloped plane and a grass-covered green roof on top. Protruding from the artificial hill there is a 40 metres (130 ft) steel cone which acts as a source of daylight and is meant to symbolize technical engineering. Although a successful exterior element, the cone was more unsatisfactory in the interior and received some criticism in architectural reviews. A series of columns distribute heat and light throughout the interior. The green roof system by ZinCo Benelux uses a cellular glass insulation and a 15-centimetre (6 in) substrate. Together with the green roof and the insulation it provides, a reduced external wall surface improves the building's energy efficiency. The roof is walkable and the students use it to sit and socialize during the summer, or as a sledding hill during the winter.

In the central hall the lending desk occupies the space at the bottom of the cone, surrounded by steel struts, with the east wall covered by suspended steel-frame bookcases going up four floor and accessible via stairs. The edge of the building is used for staff offices, with a fully glazed exterior window wall. The library is located in the center of the campus next to the brutalist-style auditorium Aula, by Jo van den Broek and Jaap Bakema, providing a new spatial context to that building. The building received awards such as the Award for the Millennium, Corus Construction (2000), and has been selected as one of the most original and beautiful libraries in the world by Condé Nast Traveler and CNN Travel respectively.

== Collections and activities ==
The library is the university's central library and also includes a learning center, student workspace rooms, a bookshop and a café. As of 2017 it had a collection of more than 862,000 books, and 16,000 magazine subscriptions. The TU Delft Library is a founding partner of DataCite, a global network established to "improve access to research data on the Internet". In 2017 the library started a data stewardship project focused on research data management.

== Gallery ==
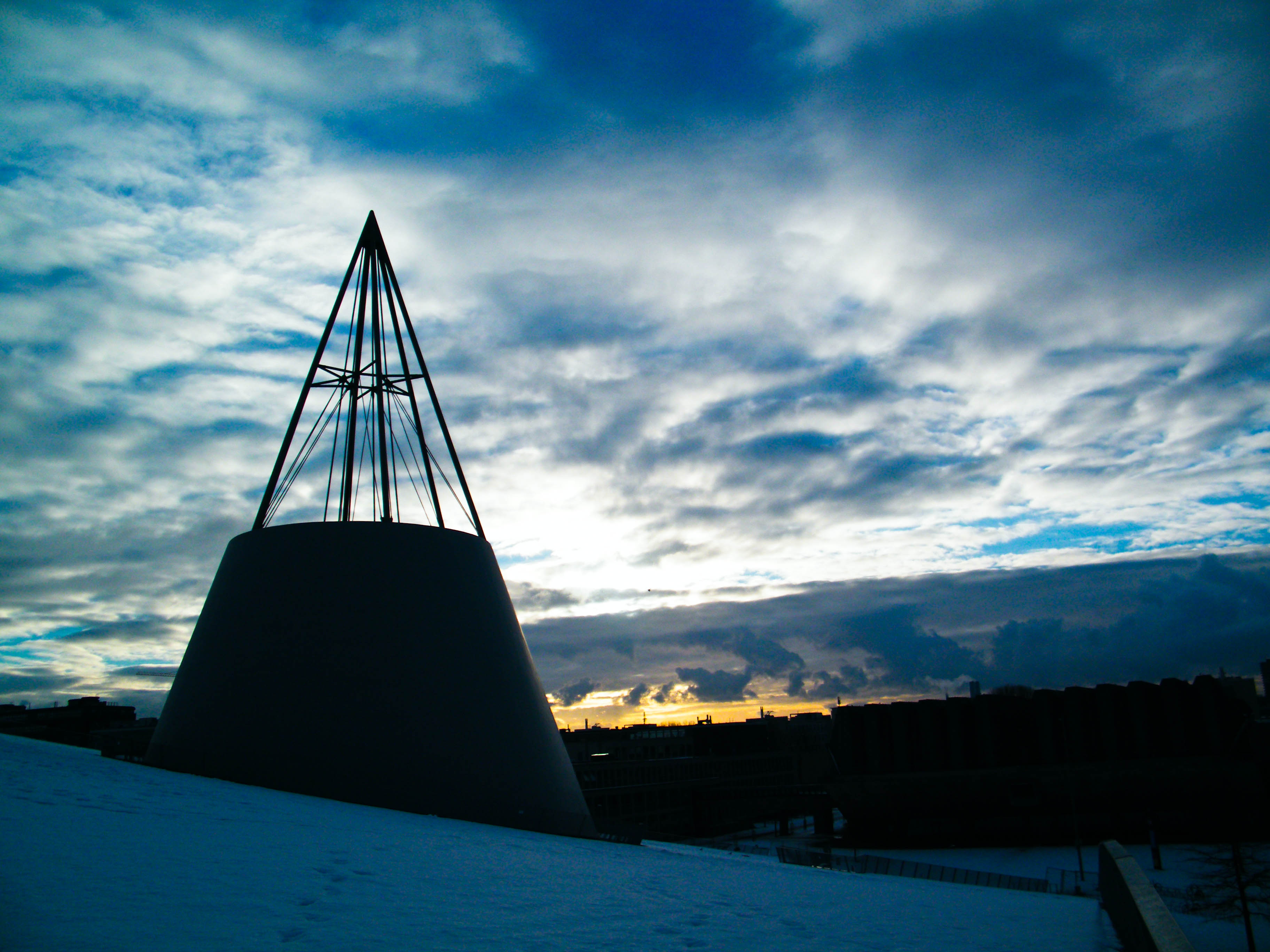
Cone during a winter sunset

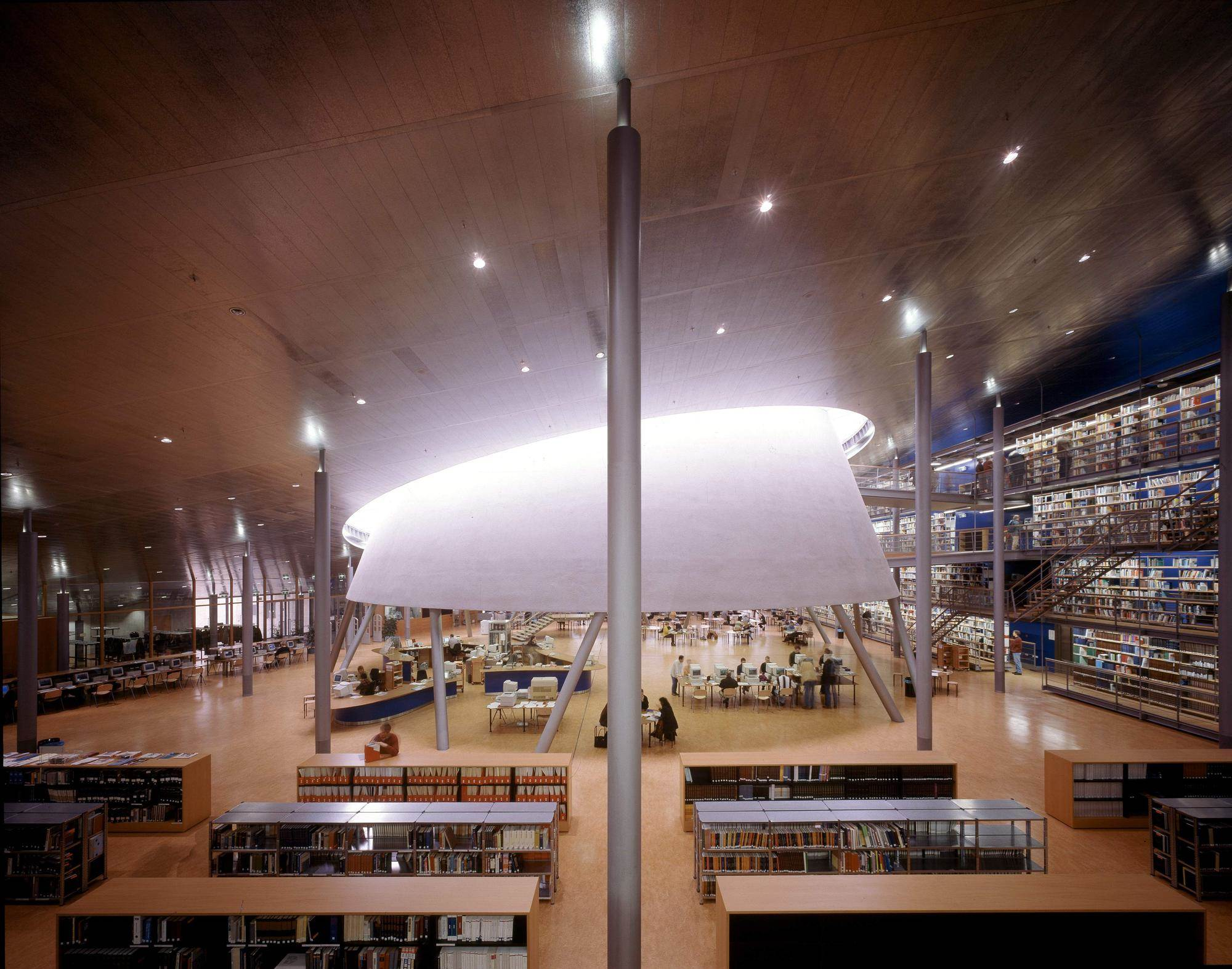
Cone inside the library

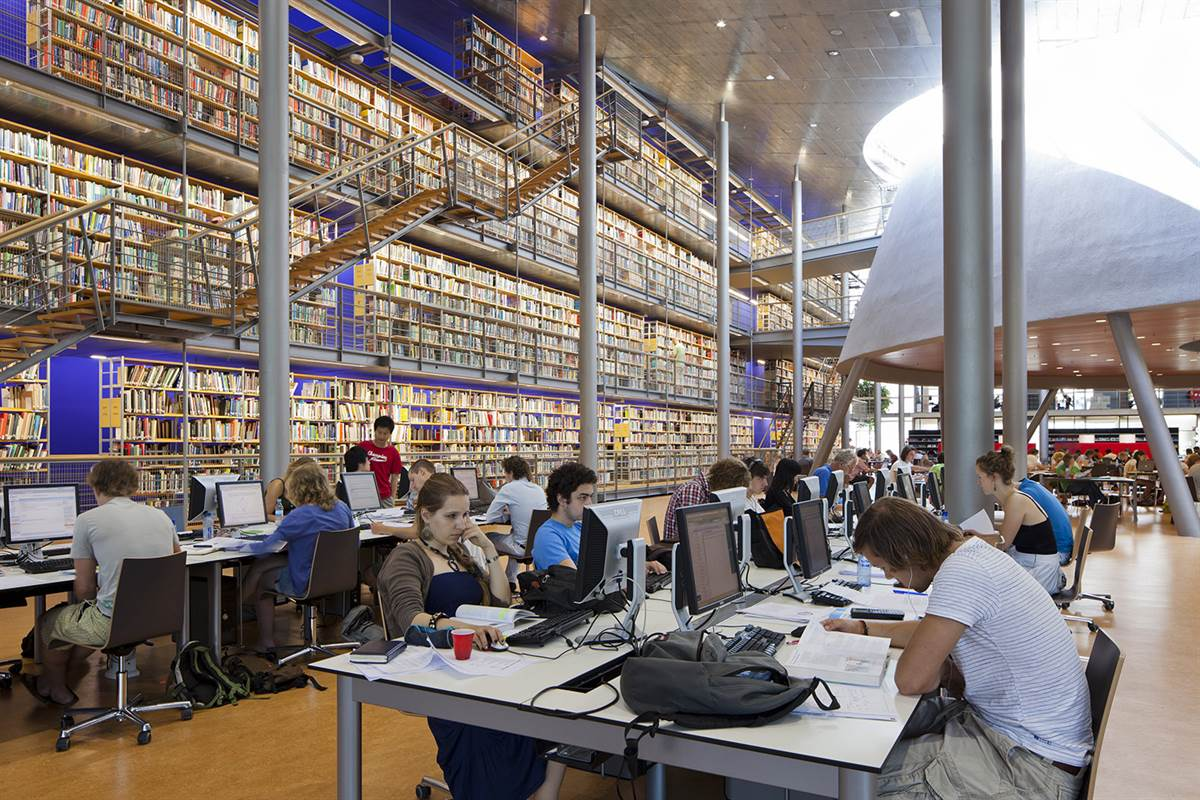
Book wall and study desks

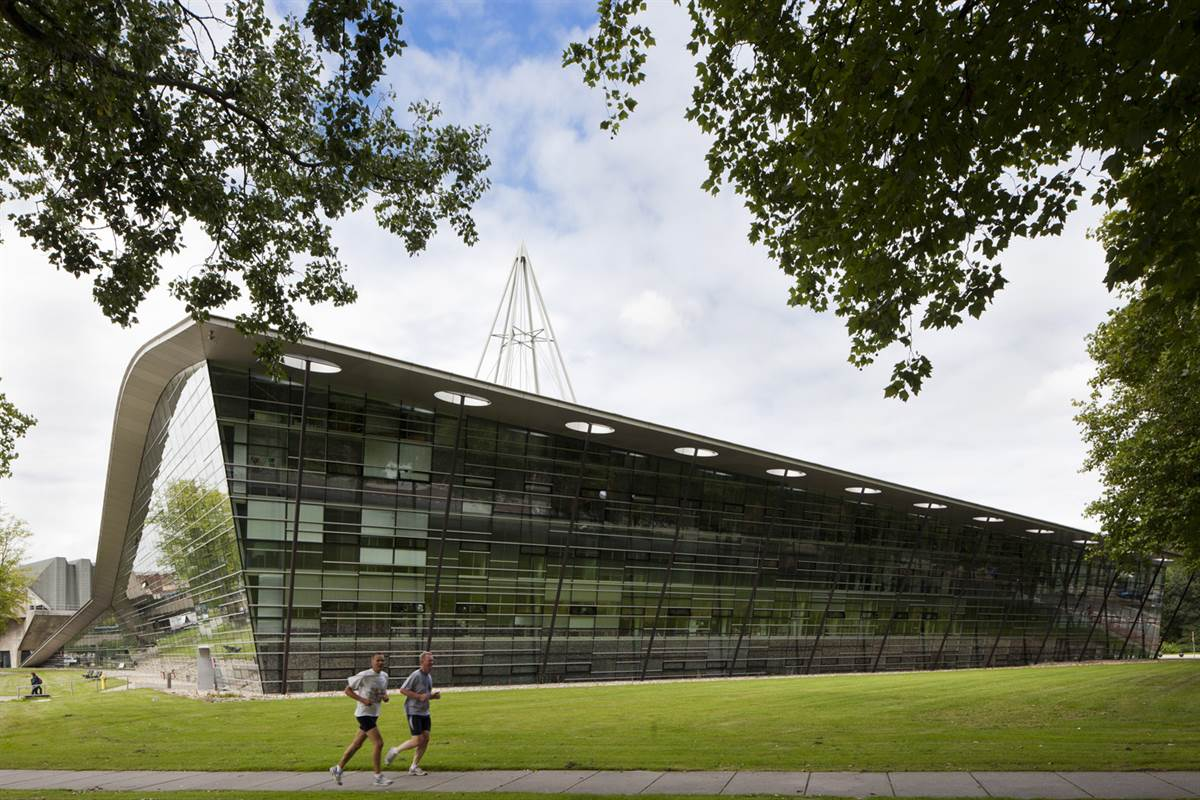
Outside of the library
