= Library of Birmingham =

Public library in Birmingham, England

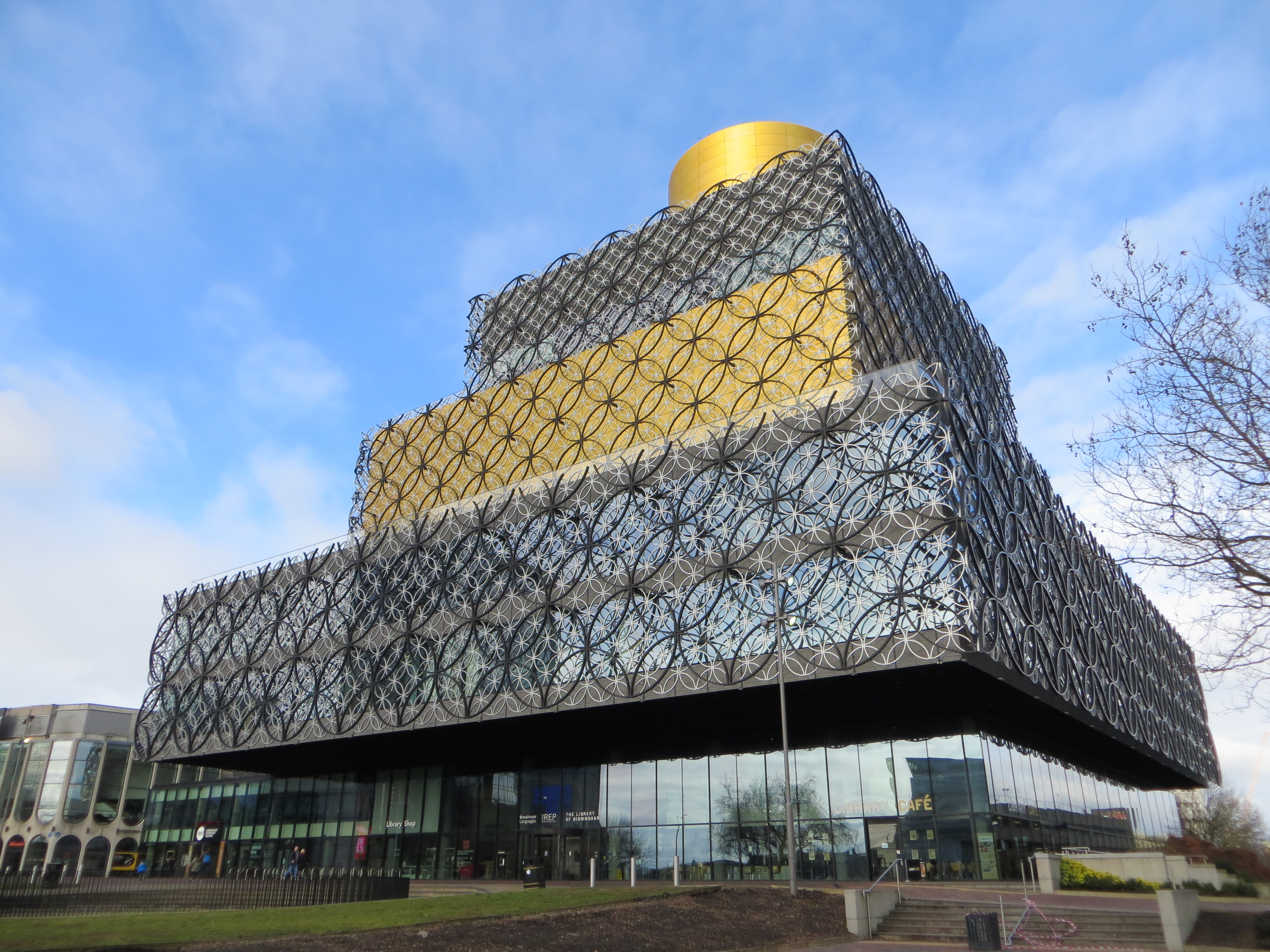

General information
- Type: Public library
- Architectural style: Postmodern; High-Tech
- Location: Centenary Square, Broad Street, Birmingham, England
- Coordinates: 52°28′47″N 1°54′30″W
- Elevation: 144 m (472 ft) AOD
- Construction started: 7 January 2010
- Completed: April 2013
- Opened: 3 September 2013; 13 years ago
- Cost: £188.8 million
- Client: Birmingham City Council
- Owner: Birmingham City Council

Height
- Height: 60 metres (200 ft)

Technical details
- Floor count: 10 (OG) 1 (UG)
- Floor area: 20,798m^{2} (plus 6,804m^{2} shared with the REP)

Design and construction
- Architect: Francine Houben
- Architecture firm: Mecanoo architecten
- Structural engineer: Buro Happold
- Services engineer: Buro Happold/Capita
- Civil engineer: Buro Happold
- Main contractor: Carillion; Capita Symonds (Project Managers)
- Awards: Architects' Journal Building of the Year 2013; RIBA West Midlands Regional Awards Building of the Year 2014; 2014 Stirling Prize (nominee)

Collection
- Items collected: Books, journals, newspapers, magazines, official publications, photographs, BFI Mediatheque, sound and music recordings, maps, postage stamps, prints, drawings, manuscripts and media.
- Size: 800,000 (Books)

Access and use
- Circulation: 316,000 (2014)

Other information
- Budget: £8.5 million (2015-16)
- Director: Brian Gambles
- Employees: 100 (2015)
- Website: www.birmingham.gov.uk/libraryofbirmingham

The Library of Birmingham is a public library in Birmingham, England. It is situated on the west side of the city centre at Centenary Square, beside the Birmingham Rep (to which it connects, and with which it shares some facilities) and Baskerville House. Upon opening on 3 September 2013, it replaced Birmingham Central Library. The library, which is estimated to have cost £188.8 million, is viewed by the Birmingham City Council as a flagship project for the city's redevelopment. It has been described as the largest public library in the United Kingdom, the largest public cultural space in Europe, and the largest regional library in Europe. 2,414,860 visitors came to the library in 2014 making it the 10th most popular visitor attraction in the UK.

== History ==
=== Background ===
Birmingham City Council looked into relocating the library for many years. The original plan was to build a new library in the emerging Eastside district, which had been opened up to the city centre following the demolition of Masshouse Circus. A library was designed by Richard Rogers on a site in the area. However, for financial reasons and reservations about the location this plan was shelved. The Council suggested that the Library be split between a new building built between the Rep Theatre and Baskerville House at Centenary Square, which until 2009 was a public car park (to house the main lending library) and a building at Millennium Point in "Eastside" (to house the archives and special collections).

In August 2006, the Council confirmed the area between the Rep Theatre and Baskerville House as the future site for the library. Capita Symonds were appointed as project managers. The council's intention was to create a "world class" landmark civic building in Centenary Square. Not long after this, the two-sites idea was scrapped and the archives and special collections will move to the site at Centenary Square.

After an international design competition, run by the Royal Institute of British Architects, a shortlist of seven architects was announced on 27 March 2008. They were chosen from a list of over 100 architects. The architects chosen were: Foreign Office Architects, Foster and Partners, Hopkins Architects, Mecanoo, OMA, Schmidt hammer lassen and Wilkinson Eyre.

In early August 2008, Mecanoo and multi-discipline engineers, Buro Happold, were announced as the winner of the design competition. More detailed plans for the library were revealed at a launch event held on 2 April 2009.

The previous Central Library failed for the second time to gain status as a listed building and was demolished in 2016, to make way for the redevelopment of Paradise Circus.

=== Reception ===
Reaction to the planned library was generally positive. Then-Poet Laureate Andrew Motion said that "These plans are properly ambitious to preserve the best traditional practice, while also opening the building to new ideas about what a library should be — the heart of the community, fulfilling all manner of social needs as well as scholarly, research-based and pleasurable ones." Philip Pullman said "The new Library of Birmingham sounds as if it will be lovely and should attract even more users than the present one with its impressive visitor total of 5,000 a day." Sir Alan Ayckbourn said "I wholeheartedly support the proposed exciting new plans to develop the new Birmingham library" and Irvine Welsh said "[It's] an audacious and compelling initiative which promises to redefine and modernise the entire notion of public library services, and in the process create the greatest public information resource in Europe ... Writers will love it, and so will readers." Architect of the Birmingham Central Library, John Madin, criticised the building as not fit for purpose in 2011. Madin said "They are spending all this money on a new library which is no better than the existing one. Eighty per cent of it will not have natural light and does not meet the standards of the existing building." In the first year of opening 2.7 million visitors passed through the doors of the library. In 2015 visitor numbers dropped to 1.8 million visits; this still made the library the 11th most popular visitor attraction in the UK and the most popular outside of London.

=== Construction ===
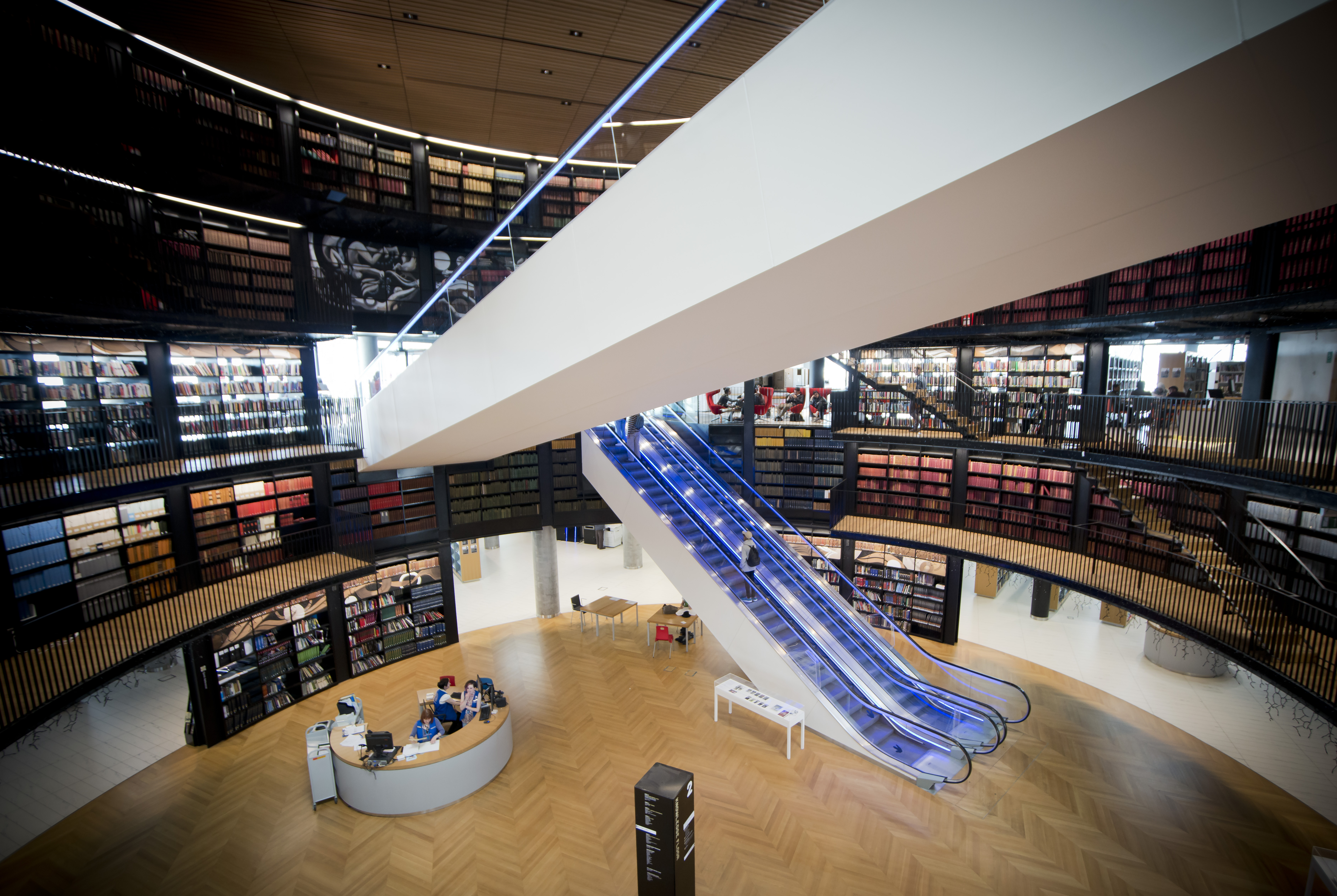
The book rotunda from Level 3

Preparation of the ground for building, and archaeological work between Baskerville House and The Rep had begun before planning permission had been granted. Planning permission was finally granted and approved by Birmingham City Council in December 2009. Building work, which was undertaken by Carillion, commenced in January 2010, with a completion schedule for 3 September 2013. A topping out ceremony to mark the completion of the highest part of the building took place on 14 September 2011.

=== Opening ===
The formal opening on 3 September 2013 was conducted by Malala Yousafzai, the Pakistani schoolgirl who survived a Taliban assassination attempt, and who now lives in Birmingham. Before unveiling a plaque, she said "Let us not forget that even one book, one pen, one teacher can change the world".

=== Awards ===
At the 2014 RIBA West Midlands Awards, the Library of Birmingham was named overall West Midlands building of the year, Mecanoo architect Patrick Arends won emerging architect of the year and Birmingham City Council won client of the year.

In the June 2014 birthday honours, the library's director, Brian Gambles, was made MBE "for services to libraries".

On 17 July 2014 the Library of Birmingham was nominated as one of the six short-listed buildings for the 2014 Stirling Prize, awarded for excellence in architecture.

=== Operations ===
In December 2014 Birmingham City Council proposed reducing the opening hours of the library because of a council funding shortfall, and in February 2015 confirmed opening hours would be reduced from 73 hours per week to 40 hours per week, saving £1.3 million per year on running costs and involving making about half of the 188 library staff redundant. From 20 April 2015 the library is open from 11 am to 7 pm Monday and Tuesday, from 11 am to 5 pm Wednesday to Saturday and closed on Sundays.

== Air-conditioning ==
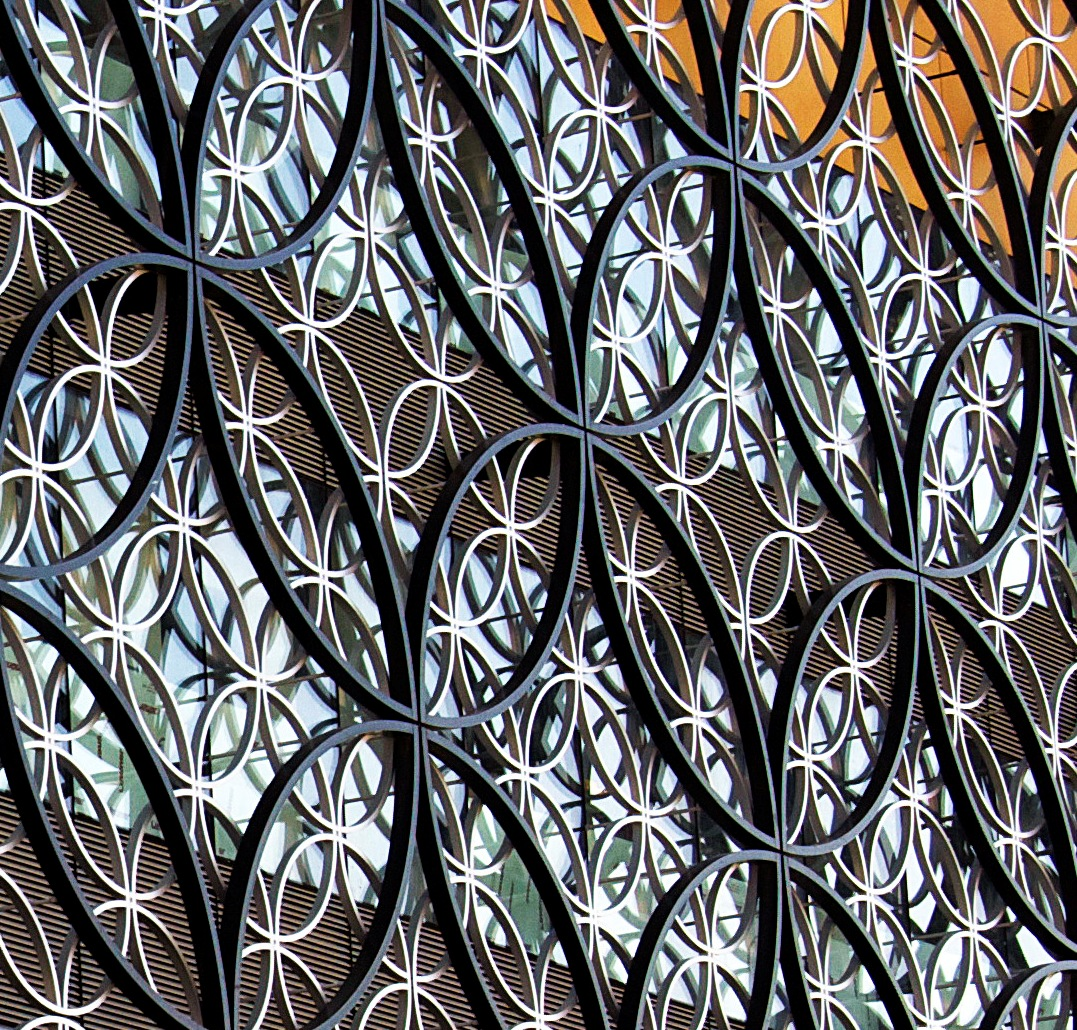
Decoration on the exterior of the building

The library uses an aquifer ground source system to reduce energy consumption. Cold groundwater is pumped up from within the earth and used in the air conditioning system. The water flows back into the ground via another drilled well. The use of groundwater as a source of renewable energy lowers the library's carbon dioxide emissions.

== Collections ==
The library has nationally and internationally significant collections, including the Boulton and Watt archives, the Bournville Village Trust Archive, the Charles Parker Archive, the Parker collection of children's books, the Wingate Bett transport ticket collection, the Railway and Canal Historical Society Library; and the photographic archives of the Warwickshire photographic survey, Sir Benjamin Stone, John Blakemore and Val Williams; and starting in 2009, continuing through 2014, acquired that of Daniel Meadows. The Daniel Meadows collection moved to the Bodleian Library in March 2018.

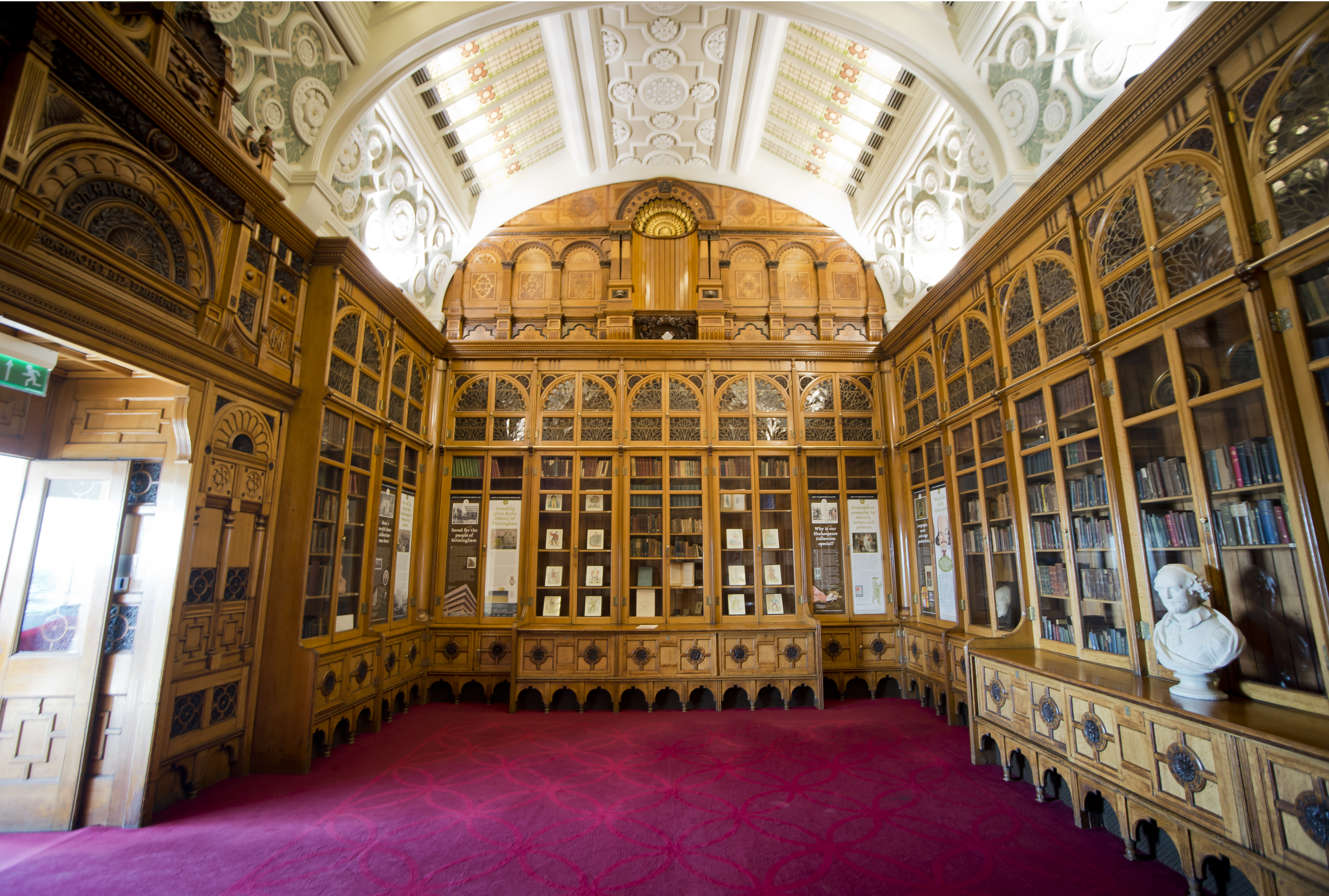
Shakespeare Memorial Room

The specialist Shakespeare Memorial Room was designed in 1882 by John Henry Chamberlain for the first Central Library. When the old building was demolished in 1974 Chamberlain's room was dismantled and later fitted into the new concrete shell of the new library complex. When the Library of Birmingham was built, it was again moved, to the top floor. It houses Britain's most important Shakespeare collection, and one of the two most important Shakespeare collections in the world; the other being held by the Folger Shakespeare Library. The collection contains 43,000 books including rare items such as a copy of the First Folio 1623; copies of the four earliest Folio editions; over 70 editions of separate plays printed before 1709 including three "Pavier" quartos published in 1619 but falsely dated. There are significant collections from the 18th, 19th and 20th centuries, a near complete collection of Collected Works, significant numbers of adaptations, anthologies and individual editions.

The Boulton and Watt Collection is the archive of the steam engine partnership of Matthew Boulton and James Watt, dating from its formation in 1774 until the firm's closure in the 1890s. The archive comprises about 550 volumes of letters, books, order books and account books, approximately 29,000 engine drawings and upwards of 20,000 letters received from customers. Boulton and Watt manufactured the screw engines for Brunel's SS Great Eastern and the archive includes a portfolio of 13 albumen prints by Robert Howlett documenting the construction of the Great Eastern, including a rare variant of the Brunel portrait of 1857.

Also displayed in the Library are two large coade stone medallions, made in the 1770s and removed from the front of the city's Theatre Royal when it was demolished in 1956. These depict David Garrick and William Shakespeare.

== Partnerships and funding ==
In July 2014 a collaboration with the British Library launched the Library of Birmingham's Business and IP Centre which offered support services for small businesses and entrepreneurs. The Business and IP Centre offers wide-ranging support, such as a weekly free Employment Law Advice clinic for small businesses, run in conjunction with Aston University.

In 2016 the library worked on a cultural collaboration with the British Library. As part of this a project around the 400th anniversary of the death of William Shakespeare took place. The collaboration was funded by the British Library Trust and tested a new way of working collaborations between the British Library and public libraries in the UK.

From July 2015 until 2016, Google took over part of the first floor for training businesses in its Digital Garage initiative.

In early 2016 the library extended weekday opening hours to 9 am to 9 pm after an agreement was made with the Council run Brasshouse Language Centre to occupy space in the building. The opening hours increased from 40 hours to 66 but still short of the original 73 hours and on remains closed on Sundays. The Brasshouse Language Centre moved into the first floor in September 2016 from their previous location on Sheepcote Street.

== See also ==
- Pete James
- List of libraries in Birmingham, West Midlands
