= FiftyTwoDegrees =

Coordinates: 51°49′28.75″N 5°49′29.97″E

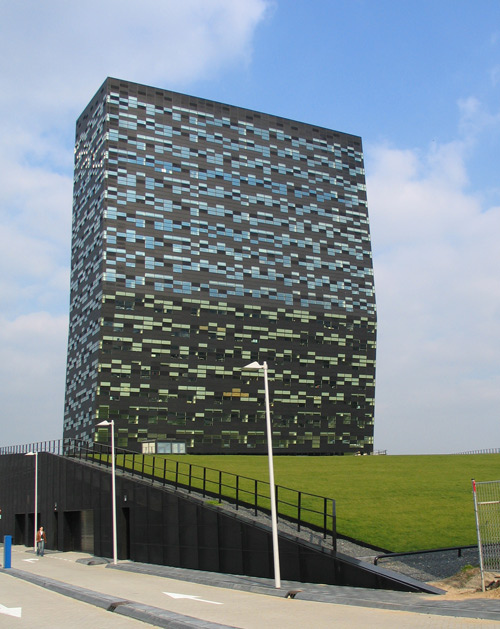
- Interactive map of the FiftyTwoDegrees area

General information
- Status: Completed
- Location: Nijmegen, Netherlands
- Completed: 2007

Design and construction
- Architects: Francine Houben and Francesco Veenstra

FiftyTwoDegrees is an 86-metre-tall (282 ft) high-rise building in Nijmegen, Netherlands. It is from a special design. Its lower floors are built as an inclined tower, while its upper sections are from conventional design. FiftyTwoDegrees was completed in 2007.

== See also ==
- Mecanoo
