= International Architecture Biennale Rotterdam =

Biannual architecture festival

The International Architecture Biennale Rotterdam (IABR) is a bi-annual international event bringing together international knowledge and experience in various design disciplines (architecture, urban planning, and landscape architecture), and presenting this knowledge and experience to a broader audience.

Unlike other events such as the Venice Biennale of Architecture, the IABR is a thematically designed research biennale; each edition addresses a pressing issue, from the perspective of current (Dutch) practices within an international context, and always with a focus on the future of the city.

The IABR implements its agenda by means of international research projects, exhibitions, master classes, workshops, conferences, lectures, debates, essays, a website, blogs, a catalogue, book, brochures, film, DVD, etc. Since the fourth edition, in 2009, the IABR has increasingly combined its research projects with concrete urban planning assignments. Particularly in the cities of Rotterdam, Istanbul and São Paulo, the biennale is actively involved in the actual development of the city.

== Editions ==
- 2003 – Mobility: A Room with a View, curator Francine Houben (Mecanoo)
- 2005 – The Flood, curator Adriaan Geuze (West8)
- 2007 – Power: Producing the Contemporary City, curator Berlage instituut, Vedran Mimica
- 2009 – Open City: Designing Coexistence, curator Kees Christiaanse (KCAP, ETH Zürich)
- 2012 – Making City, curator team Joachim Declerck, Henk Ovink, ZUS (Kristian Koreman, Elma van Boxel), Asu Aksoy, MMBB/Fernando de Mello Franco and George Brugmans
- 2014 – Urban by Nature, curator Dirk Sijmons (H+N+S, TU-Delft)
- 2016 – The Next Economy, chief curator Maarten Hajer (University of Amsterdam, PBL Netherlands Environmental Assessment Agency)
- 2018 – The Missing Link, curator team Floris Alkemade, Leo van Broeck and Joachim Declerck
- 2020–2021 – Down to Earth, chief curator George Brugmans, co-curators Thijs van Spaandonk, Rianne Makkink and Jurgen Bey
