= Martin Luther King Jr. Memorial Library =

Main public library of Washington, D.C.

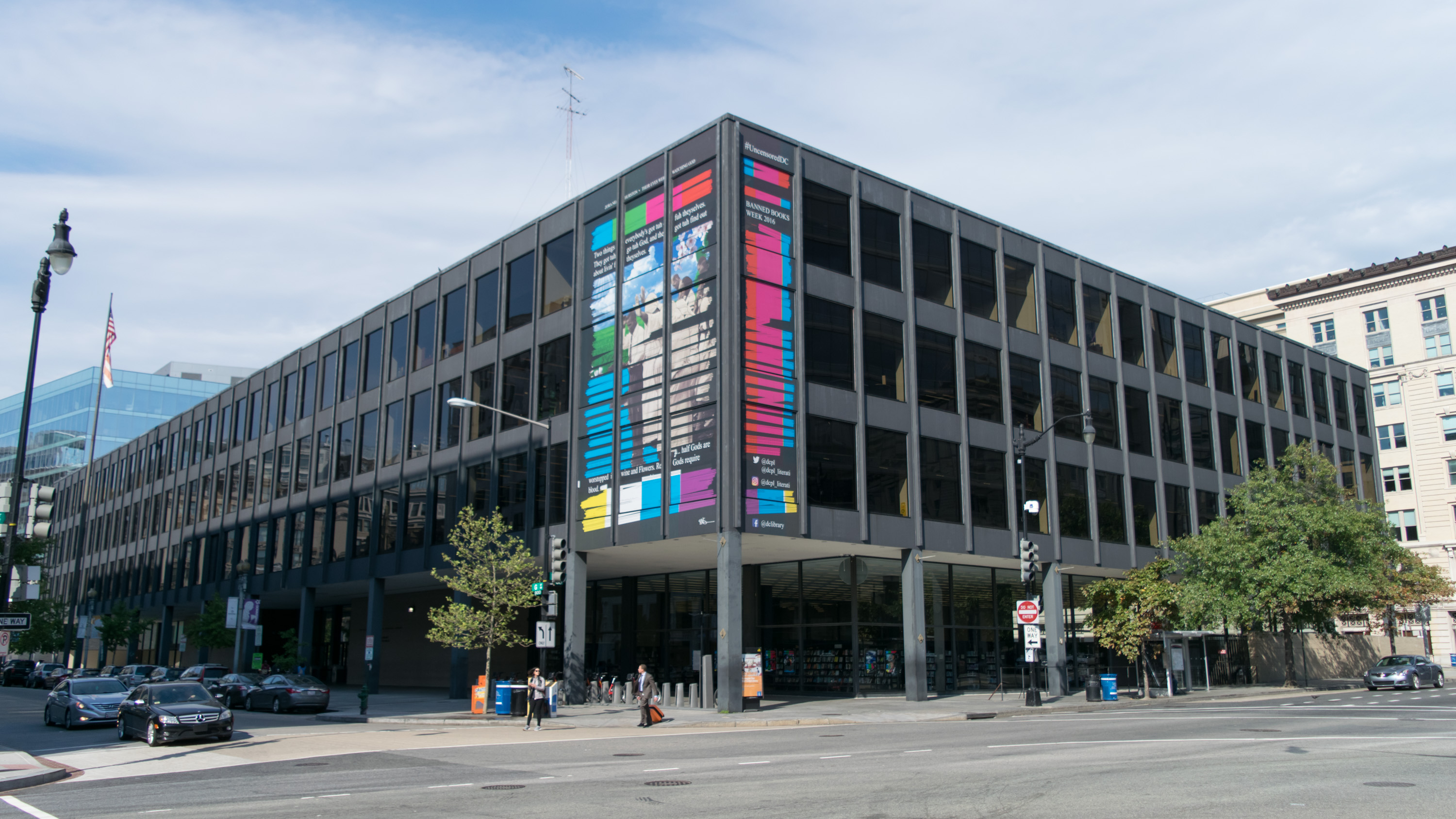
- The library in October 2016
- 38°53′55″N 77°1′29″W
- Location: 901 G St. NW; Washington, D.C., U.S.
- Type: Public library
- Established: 1972
- Architects: Ludwig Mies van der Rohe, Mecanoo
- Branch of: District of Columbia Public Library

Collection
- Items collected: artifacts, photographs, and records detailing the history, culture, and grassroots movements of the District
- Size: 1.3 million
- Criteria for collection: Modern functionality, historic preservation, and community inclusivity

Access and use
- Access requirements: General entry requires no membership
- Circulation: 6.2 million (2025)
- Population served: 727,000 (2024)

Other information
- Budget: US$7,840,000 (2025)
- Employees: 625
- Website: dclibrary.org/mlk
- King, Martin Luther, Memorial Library
- U.S. National Register of Historic Places
- NRHP reference No.: 07001102
- Added to NRHP: October 22, 2007

The Martin Luther King Jr. Memorial Library (MLKML) is the central facility of the District of Columbia Public Library (DCPL), named in honor of the American civil rights leader Martin Luther King Jr. Designed by Ludwig Mies van der Rohe, it is situated at 901 G St. NW in Downtown Washington, D.C., with its main entrance between 9th and 10th St. on the opposite corner to Gallery Place station, and the Smithsonian American Art Museum. The library is located in and around the Chinatown, Mount Vernon Square, and Penn Quarter neighborhoods. It is listed on the National Register of Historic Places.

== History ==
The city's previous central library, in Mount Vernon Square, was donated by industrialist Andrew Carnegie and dedicated in 1903.

A 1961 Booz Allen Hamilton report sponsored by the city government found that the library had become inadequate in size and technology, was located in what was now the city's "worst slum", and that "At any hour of the day or night, a collection of derelicts loaf around the Library and sleep on the curved bench in front." It called for a new library downtown, at an estimated cost of $12 million ($98.8 million in 2025).

=== Construction ===
Architect Ludwig Mies van der Rohe designed the four story, 400,000 square foot (37,000 m^{2}), steel, brick, and glass structure, an example of modern architecture, in Washington, D.C. This library was Mies's only public library, and his only building constructed in Washington, D.C.. The library was the first modern design for a building within Washington, D.C which was constituted by the Fine Arts Commission. The building was completed in 1972 at a cost of $18 million ($105 million in 2025).

By the early 2000s, years of deferred facility maintenance had become widely apparent. On June 28, 2007, the District of Columbia's Historic Preservation Review Board designated the building a historic landmark. The designation, which applies to the exterior as well as interior spaces, seeks to preserve Mies's original design while allowing the library the necessary flexibility to operate. It was listed on the National Register of Historic Places in 2007.

Performers in front of the library's entrance as part of the 2009 Music Al Fresco Series

The building's lobby includes a large mural of Martin Luther King Jr. created by artist Don Miller.

=== Renovation ===
The architecture firm Mecanoo was selected to renovate the library, starting on March 4, 2017. The renovation cost $211 million ($272 million in 2025), and the library reopened in 2020 after 3½ years. The entire interior was completely redone, and included a new auditorium, dance studio, recording studios, tool library, offices, and a rooftop garden.

=== COVID-19 ===
When the library reopened, with limited services, after the renovation, the COVID-19 pandemic was affecting the United States. The library closed again following a phased management of the pandemic. It was a center for COVID-19 testing and distribution of masks as a contribution in the city's management of COVID-19, while providing some library services.

== Accessibility ==
The library follows accessibility regulations in accordance with Americans with Disabilities Act of 1990 (ADA):

- Doors and elevators wheelchair accessible on every floor.
- One Topaz HD magnifier that allow users with impaired vision to read documents with fonts in the size most convenient from them. It includes a brightness dial, a magnification dial, a color dial, and its ergonomic design allows the screen's height and orientation. A tray allows smooth movement of the texts, and the lock button can be used to read, hold or write documents.
- ADA computers for persons with visual impairment or physical disabilities.
- Four wide elevators for patrons, and elevators for staff use.
- One public toilet for each gender on the 2nd, 3rd, 4th and 5th floors, and two family restrooms with baby changing stations located in the 5th floor.
- Air conditioning to cool the library in summer, heat pumps to warm it in winter, and ventilation on every floor.
- Lighting designed for reading.
- Two sets of stairs at the front of the building, and two at the back, for routine use and as fire exits.

=== Special collections and exhibitions ===
The Washingtoniana collection includes books, newspaper archives, maps, census records, and oral histories related to the city's history, with 1.3 million photographs from the Washington Star newspaper and the theatrical video collections of the Washington Area Performing Arts Video Archive.

The Black Studies Center was established along with the MLK Library in 1972 to collect documents related to the African diaspora focusing on African American culture.

=== Special exhibits ===
In the summer of 2023, the library showed 12 original drawings by Leonardo da Vinci from the 1400s and 1500s until August 20, 2023, in a free exhibit entitled Imagining the future – Leonardo da Vinci: In the mind of an Italian genius.

=== Auditorium ===
A 291-person state-of-the art auditorium on the fifth floor is used for hosting live performances, lectures, and film screenings, including performances by the National Museum of the United States Navy's band, and Wolf Trap Opera's world premiere of BORN FREE by Edward W. Hardy.

In 2021, the DC Public Library Foundation (DCPLF) received a $2.7 million donation from Jeff Bezos to support Beyond the Book, a library literacy program for children transitioning to elementary school. Bezos's donation was the largest ever received by the foundation. Library trustees voted to name the auditorium after Bezos, but this was criticised by city officials, including Councilmember Charles Allen and Shadow Representative Oye Owolewa, residents, and even library staff members. In response to the controversy, which included multiple letter-writing campaigns and petitions, including from two different Friends of the Library groups, Bezos himself proposed naming the auditorium after Toni Morrison, who attended Howard University in DC and had taught and mentored Bezos' ex-wife MacKenzie Scott. In the end, the space became simply "The Auditorium".

=== Terrace and garden ===
The terrace and gardens are on the fifth floor, surrounding the Auditorium. There is a garden with a view of a section of Chinatown and G, H and 9th streets. There are covered seating areas for use even in inclement weather.

== Landmark designations ==
In June 2007 the DC Historic Preservation Review Board (HPRB) designated the building exterior, enclosure, and the interior public spaces on the ground floor as a historic landmark; it is in the DC Inventory of Historic Sites. In the same year, it was listed in the National Register of Historic Places.

== See also ==
- District of Columbia Public Library
- Martin Luther King Jr.
- Library of Congress
- List of memorials to Martin Luther King Jr.
- Dr. Martin Luther King Jr. Library
- Martin Luther King Jr. Memorial
