= Lincoln Park Zoo =

Zoo in Chicago, Illinois, United States

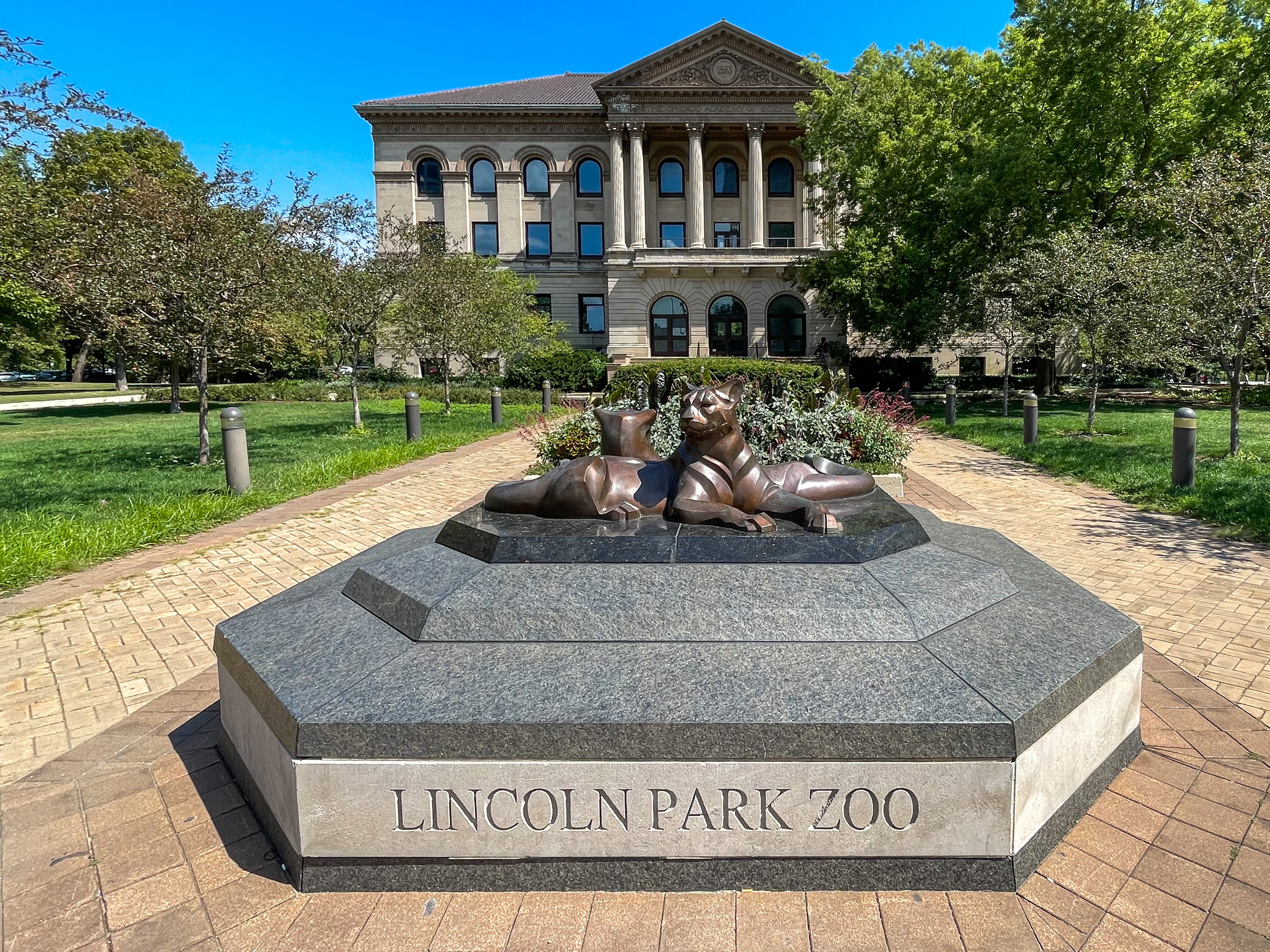
- Zoo administration building
- Interactive map of Lincoln Park Zoo
- 41°55′17″N 87°38′02″W
- Date opened: 1868
- Location: 2204 N. Cannon Drive, Chicago, Illinois, United States
- Land area: 35 acres (14 ha)
- No. of animals: 1,100
- No. of species: 200
- Annual visitors: 3.42 million
- Memberships: AZA
- Major exhibits: Farm-in-the-Zoo, Helen Brach Primate House, Pepper Family Wildlife Center, Kovler Seal Pool, McCormick Bird House, Nature Boardwalk, Pritzker Family Children's Zoo, Regenstein African Journey, Regenstein Center for African Apes, Regenstein Small Mammal-Reptile House
- Public transit: CTA; Brown Purple at Armitage
- Website: www.lpzoo.org

Lincoln Park Zoo, also known as Lincoln Park Zoological Gardens, is a 35-acre (14 ha) zoo in Lincoln Park in Chicago, Illinois. The zoo was founded in 1868 and is one of the oldest zoos in the United States. It is also one of a small number of zoos to offer free admission. The zoo is an accredited member of the Association of Zoos and Aquariums (AZA). In 2019, it also became an accredited arboretum.

Lincoln Park Zoo is home to a wide variety of animals. The zoo's exhibits include big cats, bears, penguins, apes, reptiles, monkeys, and other species totaling about 1,100 animals from some 200 species.

The Lincoln Park Zoo was long home to a burr oak tree which was estimated to more than 250 years old. The tree was cut down on May 2, 2023, due to poor health. Thirty-six scions of the tree were grafted onto root stock and are growing at the Morton Arboretum.

== History ==
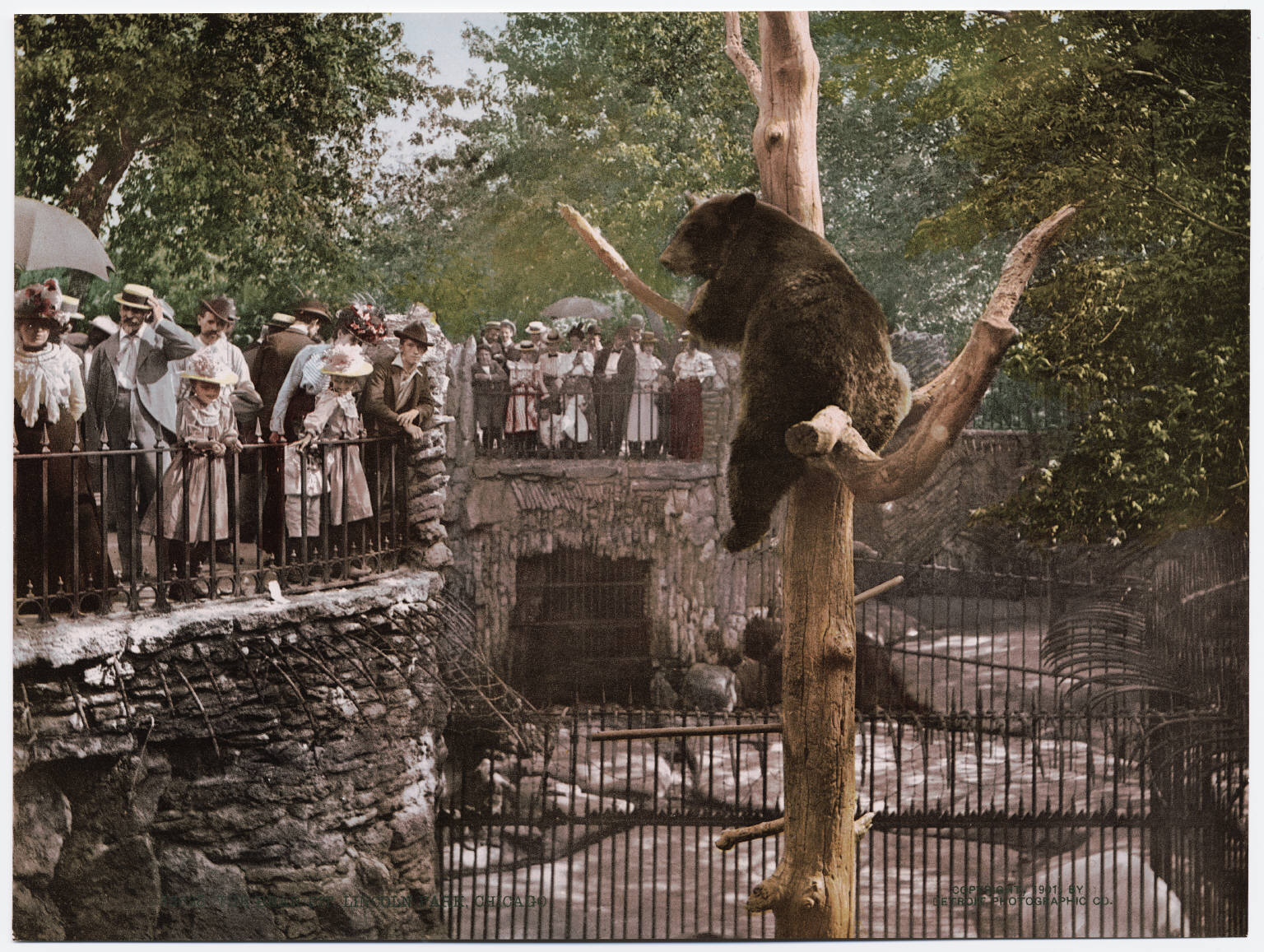
Photochrom of the bear exhibit of the Lincoln Park Zoo, c. 1897–1901

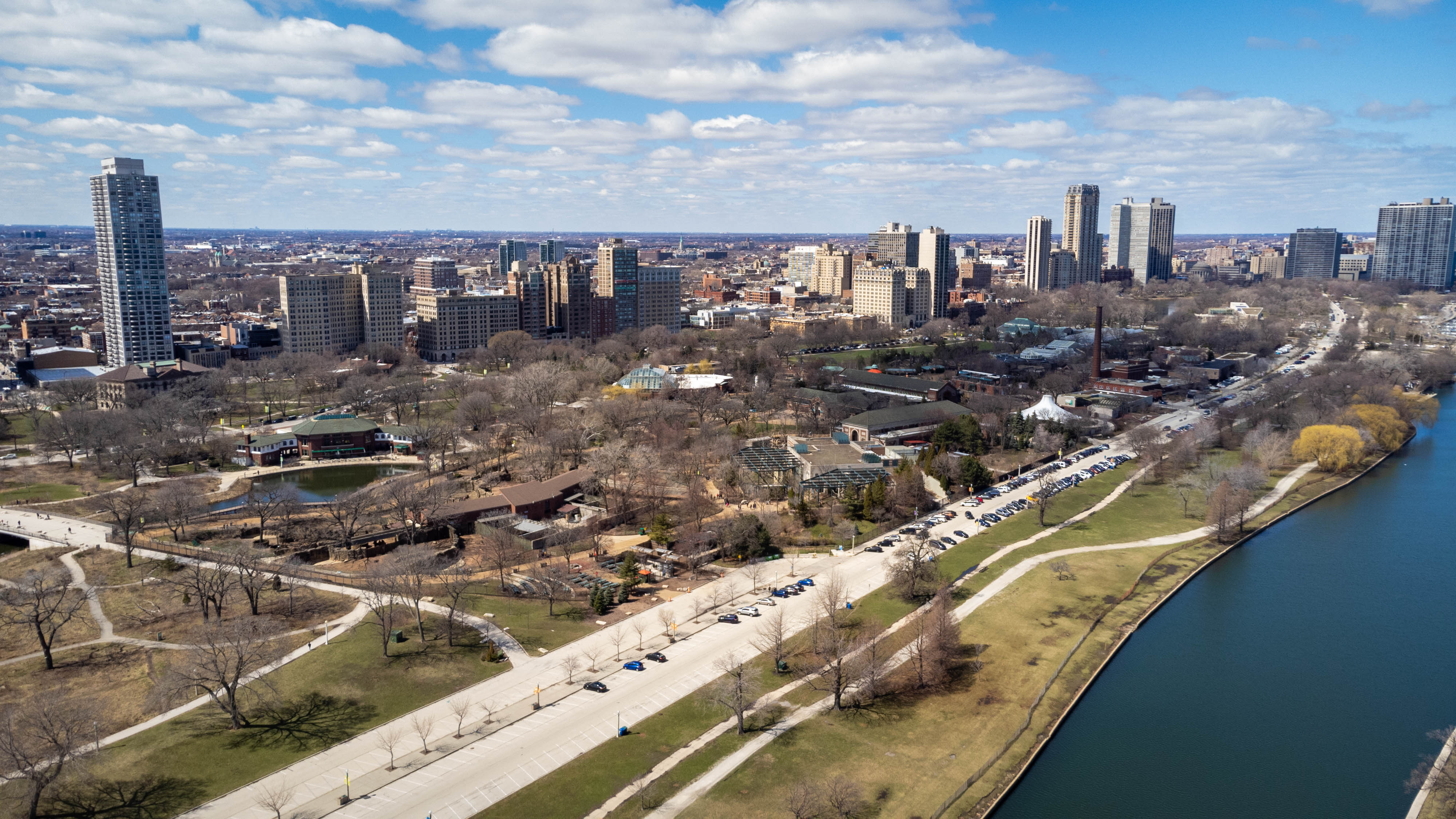
Aerial view of the zoo

News report from Voice of America of the 150th anniversary of the Lincoln Park Zoo

The zoo was founded in 1868, when the Lincoln Park Commissioners were given a gift of two pairs of swans by Central Park's Board of Commissioners in New York City. Other animals were soon donated to the park, including, a puma, two elk, three wolves, four eagles, and eight peacock. In 1874, a bear cub from the Philadelphia Zoo was the first animal purchased by the zoo, for US$10. The bear became quite adept at escaping from its home and could frequently be found roaming Lincoln Park at night. In 1884, an American bison was born at the zoo, reportedly the first of its species to be born in captivity. At this time, the species had been hunted almost to extinction in the wild—in 1896, the United States government purchased one bull and seven cows from the Zoo's bison herd to send to Yellowstone National Park to assist in the species' revival.

From 1888 to 1919 the director of the Lincoln Park Zoo was the flamboyant Cy DeVry, who organized the collection, built many new structures, and obtained the zoo's first elephant and monkeys. A new Lion House opened in 1912. It was later renovated and reopened in 1990. The Primate House opened in 1927, and it was known for housing a popular gorilla named Bushman (1931–1951), one of the only gorillas in a U. S. zoo at the time. From 1920 until a Zoo expansion in 1994, the 1893 World's Fair Viking ship was located at the zoo. The zoo's great apes were moved to the Lester E. Fisher Great Ape House in 1976, named for the zoo's outgoing director, and the original Primate House was later renovated and reopened in 1992 as the Helen Brach Primate House, featuring more naturalistic settings.

Marlin Perkins, who gained fame as the host of the television program Zoo Parade, and later Wild Kingdom, was director of the zoo from 1944 until 1962. He created and recruited a citizens group, the Lincoln Park Zoological Society, to support the Zoo's mission. The facility underwent a dramatic transformation in the 1970s and 1980s, with the additions of many new, naturalistic exhibits. In 1995, the Zoological Society assumed management of the zoo from the Chicago Park District, which is the land owner and became lessee of the Zoo in charge of administration and improvements. Zoo administration is currently housed in the nearby building previously used by the Chicago Academy of Sciences, which moved to a new facility in 1999. The Kovler Sea Lion Pool opened the same year after an extensive renovation, and it is now home to the zoo's harbor seals.

Regenstein African Journey, a renovation of the zoo's former Large Mammal House, opened in 2003, turning the zoo's largest building from concrete showcases for a few large mammals into a series of naturalistic settings that tell the story of the wildlife of the African continent, welcoming the return of the zoo's African elephants and giraffes as well as new additions such as the aardvark, ostrich, and African wild dog. Two years later, the zoo renovated its Great Ape House, opening the Regenstein Center for African Apes, which focused on the zoo's troops of common chimpanzees and western lowland gorillas, putting a special emphasis on researching the behaviors of both species and creating new, naturalistic habitats.

In 2003, the book The Ark in the Park: The Story of Lincoln Park Zoo was also published by the University of Illinois Press. The book was written by Mark Rosenthal, Carol Tauber, and Edward Uhlir.

In 2010, Lincoln Park Zoo transformed the adjacent South Pond to create the Nature Boardwalk, an ecological habitat designed by Studio Gang Architects that features native wetlands plants and wildlife.

In December 2011, the Kovler Penguin-Seabird House, which had previously been home to rockhopper, king penguins, common murres and puffins closed down after thirty years at the zoo due to worries about the deteriorating condition of the building, prompting outcry from some Chicago residents. It was soon announced it would be replaced with a newly renovated West Gate, featuring a children's train and an all-new exhibit, Regenstein Macaque Forest, featuring Japanese macaques, or "snow monkeys", in a state-of-the-art exhibit with a hot spring, set to open in fall 2014.

It was announced in March 2014 that the zoo's Robert R. McCormick Bear Habitat, or "Bear Line", would be torn down and rebuilt with a large and significantly improved habitat for the zoo's lone polar bear, with much more land area for the bears and a behind-the-scenes den for breeding. The new exhibit would also feature a new African penguin habitat, a new species for the zoo from the tropical coasts of Africa, enabling them to stand the zoo's harsh summers as well as its cold winters. This exhibit would also be fully outdoors and equipped for over a dozen penguins with a behind-the-scenes breeding area. Construction began after the opening of Regenstein Macaque Forest in fall 2014, with Robert and Mayari Pritzker Penguin Cove opening in late 2016.

In 2016, the Zoo announced the Pride of Chicago fundraising campaign, which sought $125 million in funding, and led to the construction of Regenstein Macaque Forest, Robert and Mayari Pritzker Penguin Cove and Walter Family Arctic Tundra, would conclude with a long-awaited $30 million renovation of the aging Kovler Lion House as part of the Pride of Chicago fundraising campaign, acknowledging the public perception problems with the exhibit, which had been constrained by its Historic Landmark status during previous renovations, most recently in 1992. The new exhibit opened in late 2021 and focuses squarely on lions as opposed to other big cat species it had previously held, such as tigers .

=== Programming ===
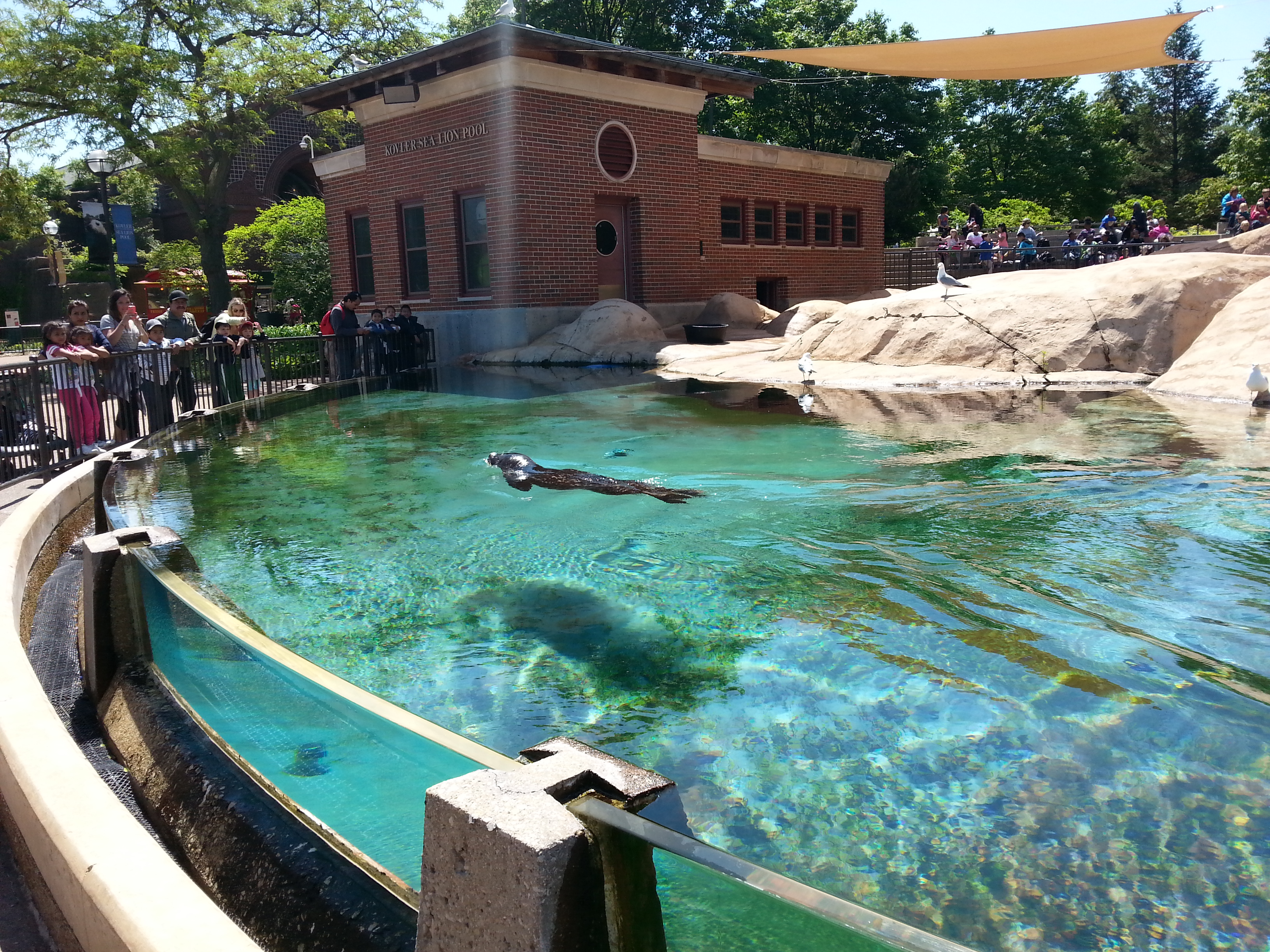
School field trip to the zoo, at the Kovler Seal Pool

The zoo together with technological help from the Adler Planetarium is aiming to expand its survey of Chicago area wildlife with public assistance at an interactive website, Zooniverse. The zoo has positioned motion sensing cameras in the Chicago area to catch images of wildlife, and the public is asked to help identify the animals.

The Zoo operates a number of youth-focused programs including a number of year-round camps, facilitated school program field trips, and a number of community engagement initiatives that prioritize the Little Village and North Lawndale communities. Both the Little Village and North Lawndale outreach programs include community gardening programs that focus on creating green spaces in Chicago and on promoting healthy eating habits.

Like many other zoos and aquariums nationally, Lincoln Park Zoo adapted many of its programs to a digital format during the COVID-19 pandemic. This included creating modified versions of its local program offerings, such as running their Artecito program, which connects Little Village families with nature through the arts, in conjunction with the OPEN Center for the Arts through free biweekly programs.

== Exhibits ==
The zoo's collection totals nearly 1,100 animals.

=== Walter Family Arctic Tundra ===
Redeveloped from the former Robert R. McCormick Bear Habitat in the zoo's northeast corner, Walter Family Arctic Tundra is a new exhibit for the zoo's grizzly and polar bears, larger than the previous habitat with more land for the bears to roam on; instead of strict rockwork, there is natural grass, a new underwater viewing area, a maternity den, and enough space to support a small breeding family of bears.

List of animals
- Grizzly bear
- Polar bear

=== Robert and Mayari Pritzker Penguin Cove ===
Linked to the nearby Regenstein African Journey, Penguin Cove is a new outdoor African penguin exhibit, where visitors can watch as these tropical penguins dive into the water, with a behind-the-scenes area for hatching chicks and breeding the species. The zoo also offers indoor Penguin Encounters. The exhibit opened to the public in October 2016.

List of animals
- African penguin

=== Regenstein Macaque Forest ===
Opened in 2014, Macaque Forest is an exhibit allowing guests to connect with a troop of 10–15 Japanese macaques in a camouflaged forest scene with views from both above and eye-level with the animals. The exhibit features a "hot spring", a trademark favorite of the species, which allows them to warm up in the winter and amuse guests. It also functions as a dedicated research station for the macaques. It is the zoo's third exhibit to house primates.

List of animals
- Japanese macaque

=== Regenstein African Journey ===
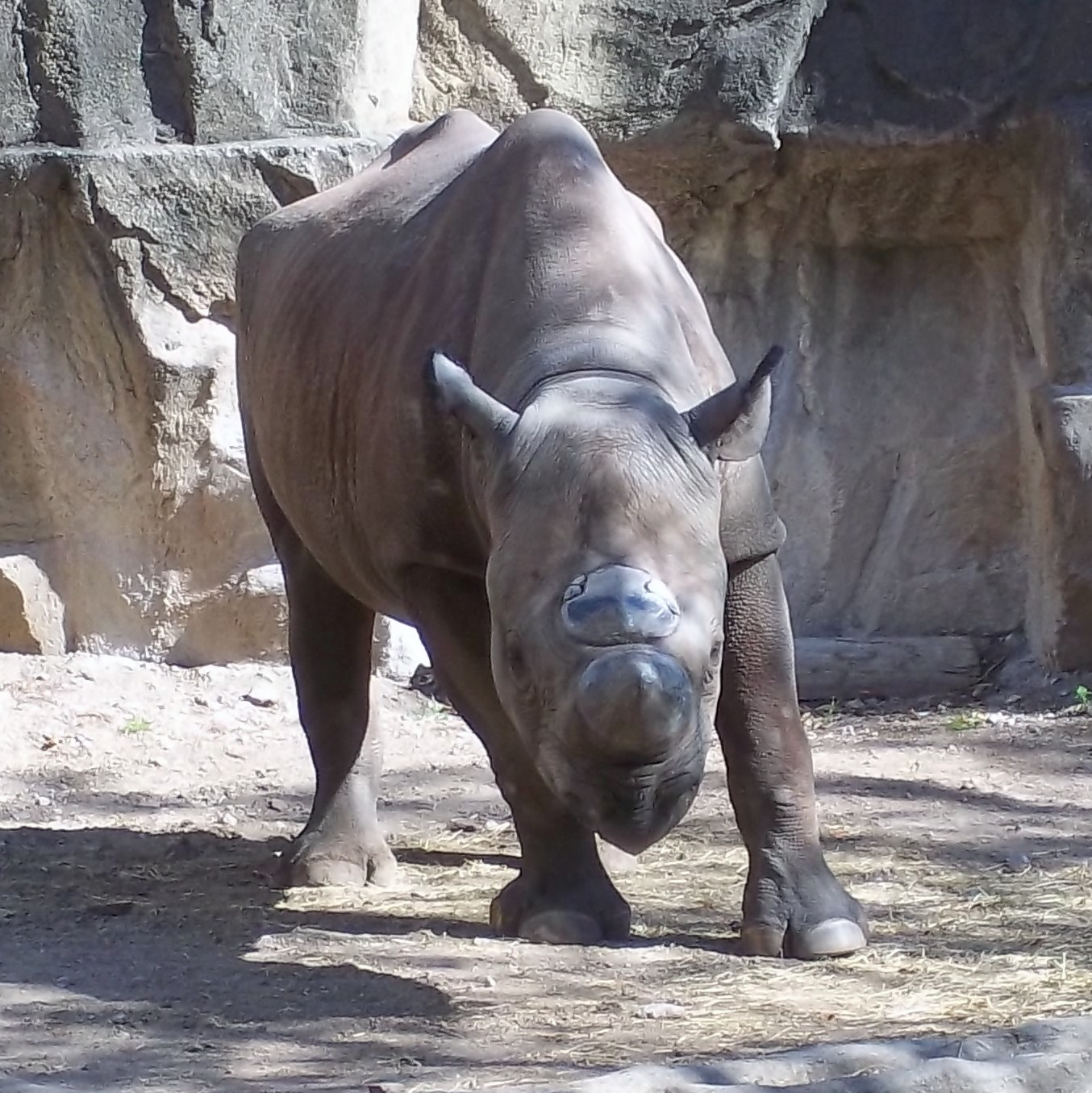
Black rhinoceros at Lincoln Park Zoo

The Regenstein African Journey exhibit is a 60,000-square-foot indoor-and-outdoor exhibit which opened in May 2003 on the site of the zoo's former Regenstein Large Mammal House. It simulates four distinct habitats from the African continent. Large skylights permit natural light into the indoor area, and guests are greeted quickly by monkeys in a rainforest setting as they enter Africa. The second section focuses on African rivers, with massive glass panels for hybrid land/water exhibits for West African dwarf crocodiles, pygmy hippos, and a Lake Malawi cichlid tank with an 11,000-lb., 7-in.-thick glass panel. The third section, focused on the African savanna, featured habitats for a large group of meerkats, a space for the zoo's aardvarks, and an indoor habitat for the giraffes. The fourth and final section simulates African kopje habitats, with klipspringer antelopes hopping along the way.

The main outdoor exhibit is a large, expansive African savanna setting just outside the indoor exhibit exit that primarily houses the zoo's giraffes. There is also a large yard for a family of African painted dogs, a hog yard that has been used by both common warthogs and currently red river hogs, and multiple yards for the zoo's black rhinos. While many of these animals cannot be viewed indoors, they have access to indoor habitats year-round.

When the exhibit opened, it was also home to three African bush elephants acquired from the San Diego Zoo Safari Park in April 2003, but all three died within two years, the last one dying while in transit to the Hogle Zoo in 2005, sparking concerns about the exhibit. It later briefly held Bactrian camels, but it is currently an additional home for the zoo's rhinos.

One noted resident of the exhibit was R1 (or Reptile One) the dwarf crocodile, who was seventy years old when he died in 2010, having lived within the zoo's Reptile House (now Park Place Café), the Regenstein Small Mammal-Reptile House, and finally, Regenstein African Journey throughout his life.

List of animals

Mammals

- Aardvark
- African wild dog
- Diana monkey
- Eastern black rhinoceros
- Grant's zebra
- Klipspringer
- Meerkat
- Pygmy hippopotamus
- Red river hog
- Reticulated giraffe

Reptiles

- Dwarf crocodile

Birds

- African spoonbill
- Abdim's stork
- Blue-bellied roller
- Blue-billed teal
- Crested guineafowl
- Hadada ibis
- Northern red-billed hornbill

Invertebrates

- Golden silk spider
- Madagascar hissing cockroach

Fish

- Lake Malawi cichlid

=== Regenstein Center for African Apes ===
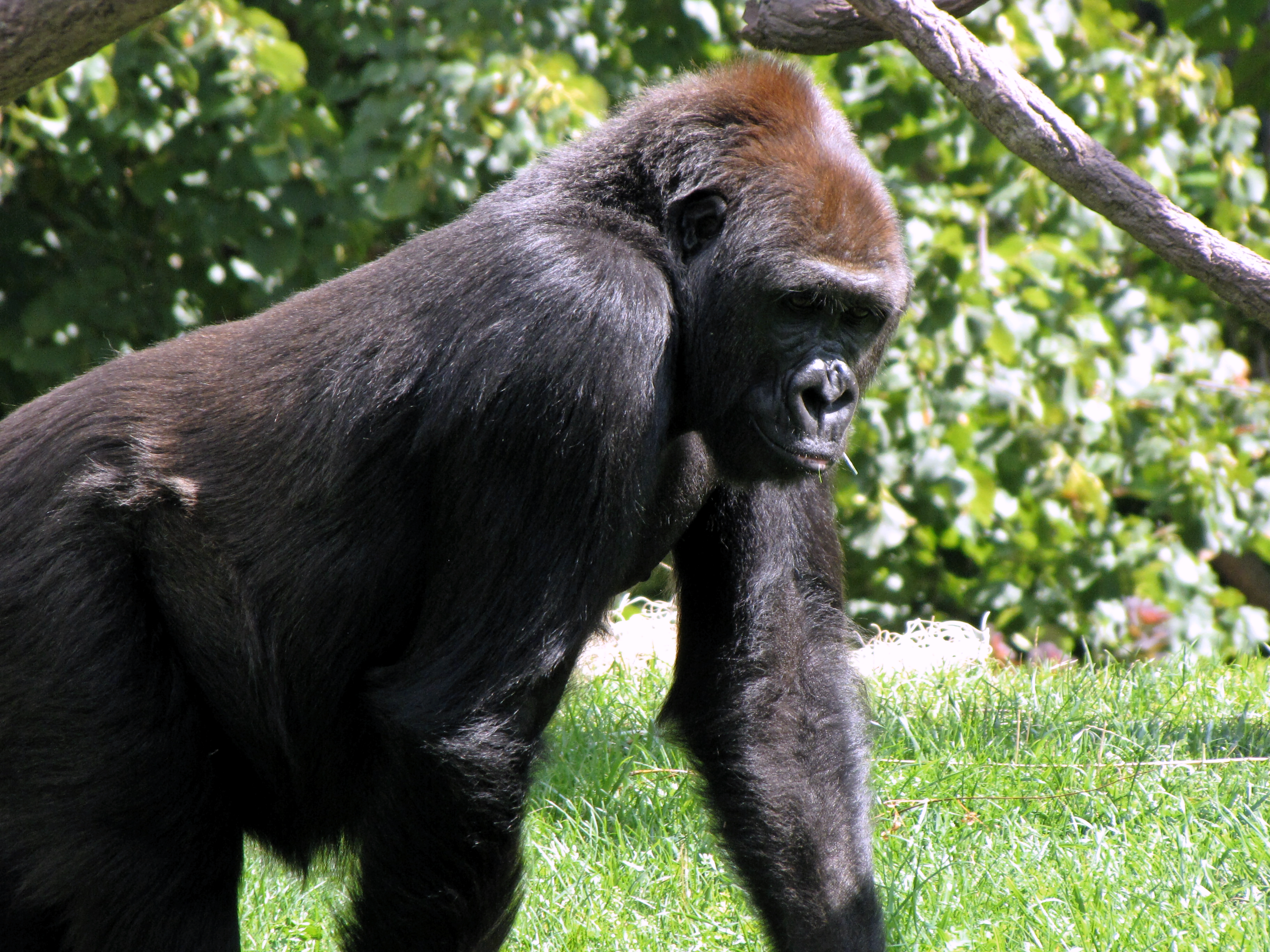
A gorilla walks around at the zoo.

Lincoln Park Zoo's dedication to primate research continued when the Lester E. Fisher Great Ape House was closed and rebuilt with a new focus on the two African ape species, the chimpanzee and western lowland gorilla. The new center, opened in 2005, has over 29,000 square feet of indoor and outdoor living space for three ape troops, featuring dozens of trees, artificial vines, real and simulated bamboo, as well as skylights, waterfalls, moats, heated logs, and termite mounds for chimpanzees to illustrate their knowledge of tools to 'fish' for termites in their mounds.

The exhibit has three spacious habitats—the 12,000-square-foot Kovler Gorilla Bamboo Forest, an open-air habitat with a moat around it, dedicated to the zoo's main gorilla troop. Two additional exhibits—the Strangler Fig Forest and Dry Riverbed Valley—each with mesh netting to secure the animals, can accommodate either chimpanzees or gorillas. Huge glass panels give guests nose-to-nose access with the zoo's apes both in the trees and on the ground. The exhibit also contains the Lester E. Fisher Center for the Study and Conservation of Apes, which encourages zoo guests to engage in research and scientific development to conserve apes in the wild.

Notable residents of this exhibit include Kwan, the current silverback in the zoo's gorilla troupe who appeared in the film Return to Me as Sidney, a chimpanzee named Optimus Prime, after the fictional character of the same name, and formerly Keo, the oldest male chimpanzee in a North American zoo at the time of his death in September 2013 at fifty-five. Custom-made stuffed animals of Kwan and Optimus in their likenesses are available in the zoo's Wild Things gift shop.

List of animals
- Chimpanzee
- Western lowland gorilla

=== Pritzker Family Children's Zoo ===
The new Pritzker Family Children's Zoo, which opened in 2004, features a number of native eastern American wildlife, and lets visitors of all ages connect with the wild creatures in our own backyard and engages them to think about how species survive in the wilderness. Small amphibians and reptiles are featured in a small indoor exhibit, along with a leaf-themed climber play area for youngsters designed by Tom Luckey, with slightly larger indoor exhibits for birds and reptiles and large glass windows on each end so guests young and old can watch American beavers and the popular North American river otters swim gracefully underwater at eye-level in their outdoor habitats, with educational displays about how beavers build dams. Outside the building there are many areas where local birds nest. The building is surrounded by small outdoor viewing areas for the same otter and beaver habitats.

There are two significantly larger exhibits surrounding the path around the building for the American black bear and the endangered red wolf featuring heavy foliage and a naturalistic stream, allowing visitors to go eye-to-eye with the animals or for the animals to hide in the foliage. Statues of gray wolves and signs encourage guests to practice howling and teach them about wolf pack dynamics.

List of animals

Mammals

- American black bear
- North American beaver
- North American river otter
- Red wolf

Reptiles

- Blanding's turtle
- Ornate box turtle
- Spotted turtle
- Three-toed box turtle
- Wood turtle

Birds

- Eastern screech owl
- Hooded merganser

=== Kovler Seal Pool ===
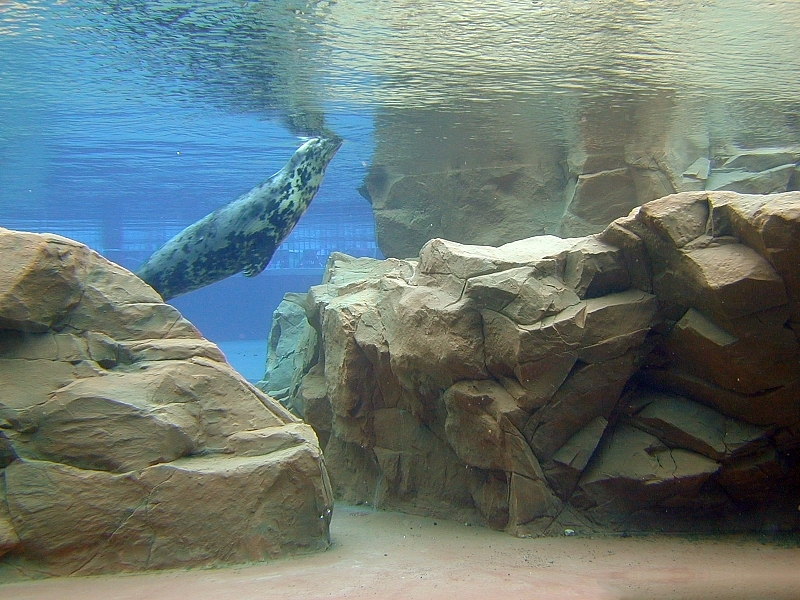
Kovler Seal Pool

One of the zoo's most popular exhibits since its first iteration in 1879, the Kovler Seal Pool is one of oldest exhibits at Lincoln Park Zoo. It was renovated most recently in May 1999 in hopes of creating a habitat that most resembles their natural environment in the wild.

There are three main viewing areas—from behind a fence in front of the tank on the main zoo path, an amphitheater-style seating area above the tank on the opposite end, and an underwater viewing gallery where visitors can watch the seals glide through the water. The zoo's pinnipeds are trained voluntarily twice a day, and given fish treats as rewards. Though multiple species of seal and sea lion have lived in the pool together in the past, since May 2013 it has been home only to gray and harbor seals.

List of animals
- Gray seal
- Harbor seal

=== Regenstein Small Mammal-Reptile House ===
The Regenstein Small Mammal-Reptile House is a 32,000-square-foot (3,000 m^{2}) indoor exhibit that opened in 1997 and houses small animals in two main areas: the Gallery and the Ecosystem. The Gallery begins with a large room ringed with terrariums exhibiting reptiles and amphibians. The next part of the Gallery features small mammals in and around a man-made baobab tree trunk. The building continues in the Ecosystem, a geodesic dome 45 feet (14 m) in height that simulates the world's tropical rainforests. The Ecosystem begins with a series of stream exhibits for caimans and otters, and continues with mixed-species exhibits for arboreal species like primates,.

List of animals

Mammals

- Asian small-clawed otter
- Brush-tailed bettong
- Cactus mouse
- Common dwarf mongoose
- Egyptian fruit bat
- Hoffmann's two-toed sloth
- Mohol bushbaby
- Naked mole-rat
- Northern treeshrew
- Prehensile-tailed porcupine
- Pygmy slow loris
- Southern three-banded armadillo
- White-faced saki

Reptiles

- African rock python
- Aruba island rattlesnake
- Black tree monitor
- Eastern massasauga
- Green tree python
- Iranian fat-tailed gecko
- Jamaican iguana
- Northern blue-tongued skink
- Oriente knight anole
- Prehensile-tailed skink
- Red-footed tortoise
- Rio Fuerte beaded lizard
- Spectacled caiman
- Virginia islands boa
- West African Gaboon viper
- Yellow-spotted river turtle

Amphibians

- Amazon milk frog
- Anthony's poison dart frog
- Axolotl
- Dyeing poison dart frog
- Emperor newt
- Oriental fire-bellied toad
- Solomon Islands leaf frog

Fish

- White blotched river stingray

Birds

- Puerto Rican parrot

Invertebrates

- Carlsbad green tarantula
- Common walkingstick

=== Regenstein Birds of Prey Exhibit ===
This popular outdoor exhibit near McCormick Bird House allows visitors to observe powerful birds-of-prey through stunning outdoor aviaries that give them plenty of room to spread their wings or to perch on rocks or tree branches in their enclosures. These exhibits emphasize how birds-of-prey play a role as "nature's clean-up crew". One large, lush outdoor habitat contains multiple specimens, including breeding pairs of cinereous vultures and white stork, while two adjacent aviaries contain the zoo's resident bald eagle and the next features a snowy owl next door. A baby vulture was born at the zoo in June 2013 but was abandoned by its parents and had to be hand-reared and reintroduced gradually.

List of animals
- Bald eagle
- Cinereous vulture
- Snowy owl
- White stork

=== Helen Brach Primate House ===
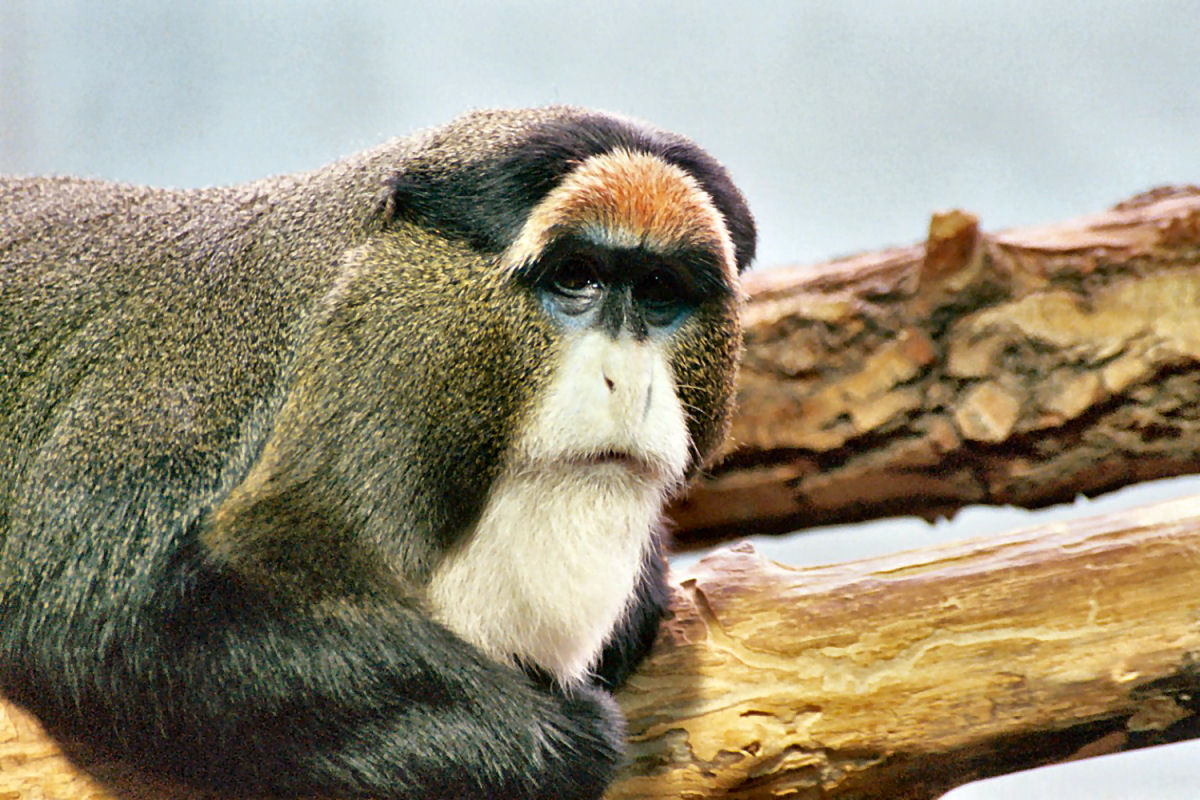
De Brazza's monkey (Cercopithecus neglectus) at the zoo

The zoo's historic Primate House first opened in 1927, featuring apes and monkeys from different locations and habitats in a series of small, identical barred cages typical of most early zoo exhibits. It became famous for its apes, including a gorilla named Bushman, until the Great Ape House opened. The Primate House's interior was heavily renovated in the early 1990s and it was re-opened as the Helen Brach Primate House in 1992 with eight diorama-style naturalistic exhibits simulating the swamps and rainforests of the animals' natural habitats in the wild. Perhaps its most notable residents are a family of white-cheeked gibbons that have a spacious room inside as well as an outdoor habitat for playing in the warm winter months. The zoo's male and female gibbons gave birth to baby Daxin on August 16, 2013.

Crowned lemurs joined the exhibit in October 2013 from the Indianapolis Zoo and a baby lemur was born at the zoo on April 14, 2014.

List of animals
- Allen's swamp monkey
- Black-and-white colobus monkey
- Bolivian gray titi monkey
- Callimico
- Crowned lemur
- De Brazza's monkey
- François' langur
- Hoffmann's two-toed sloth
- Northern white-cheeked gibbon
- Pied tamarin
- Southern black howler monkey

=== McCormick Bird House ===
One of the zoo's most historic buildings, the McCormick Bird House was first designed in 1904 under Cyrus DeVry, the zoo's original director. It has been redesigned multiple times, most recently in 1991, and is currently home to multiple habitats recreating the tropics, savanna, sea shore, desert, wetlands, and other biomes, with a tropical free-flight aviary allowing guests to become immersed with perching and aquatic birds without fences or glass. Some of the zoo's most notable birds include the famous laughing kookaburra in the scrub display, multiple scarlet ibis specimens in its swamp display and the Bali myna, a critically endangered bird that Lincoln Park Zoo breeds, while also maintaining the species' studbook. Thirty-one mynahs have been born at the zoo since 1972, with the most recent set of chicks being born in mid-2012.

List of animals
- Abdim's stork
- American avocet
- Baer's pochard
- Bali myna
- Black-necked stilt
- Blue-crowned laughingthrush
- Blue-crowned motmot
- Blue-faced honeyeater
- Blue-grey tanager
- Bourke's parrot
- Chinese hwamei
- Collared finchbill
- Crested wood partridge
- Emerald starling
- Golden-breasted starling
- Green broadbill
- Guam kingfisher
- Guam rail
- Guira cuckoo
- Hamerkop
- Helmeted curassow
- Inca tern
- Jambu fruit dove
- Kagu
- Laughing kookaburra
- Luzon bleeding-heart
- Mandarin duck
- Masked lapwing
- Nicobar pigeon
- Red-billed leiothrix
- Red-capped cardinal
- Scarlet ibis
- Snowy-crowned robin-chat
- Snowy egret
- Spotted thick-knee
- Sunbittern
- Taveta weaver
- Tawny frogmouth
- Violet turaco
- White-headed buffalo weaver
- White-rumped shama

=== South Loop ===
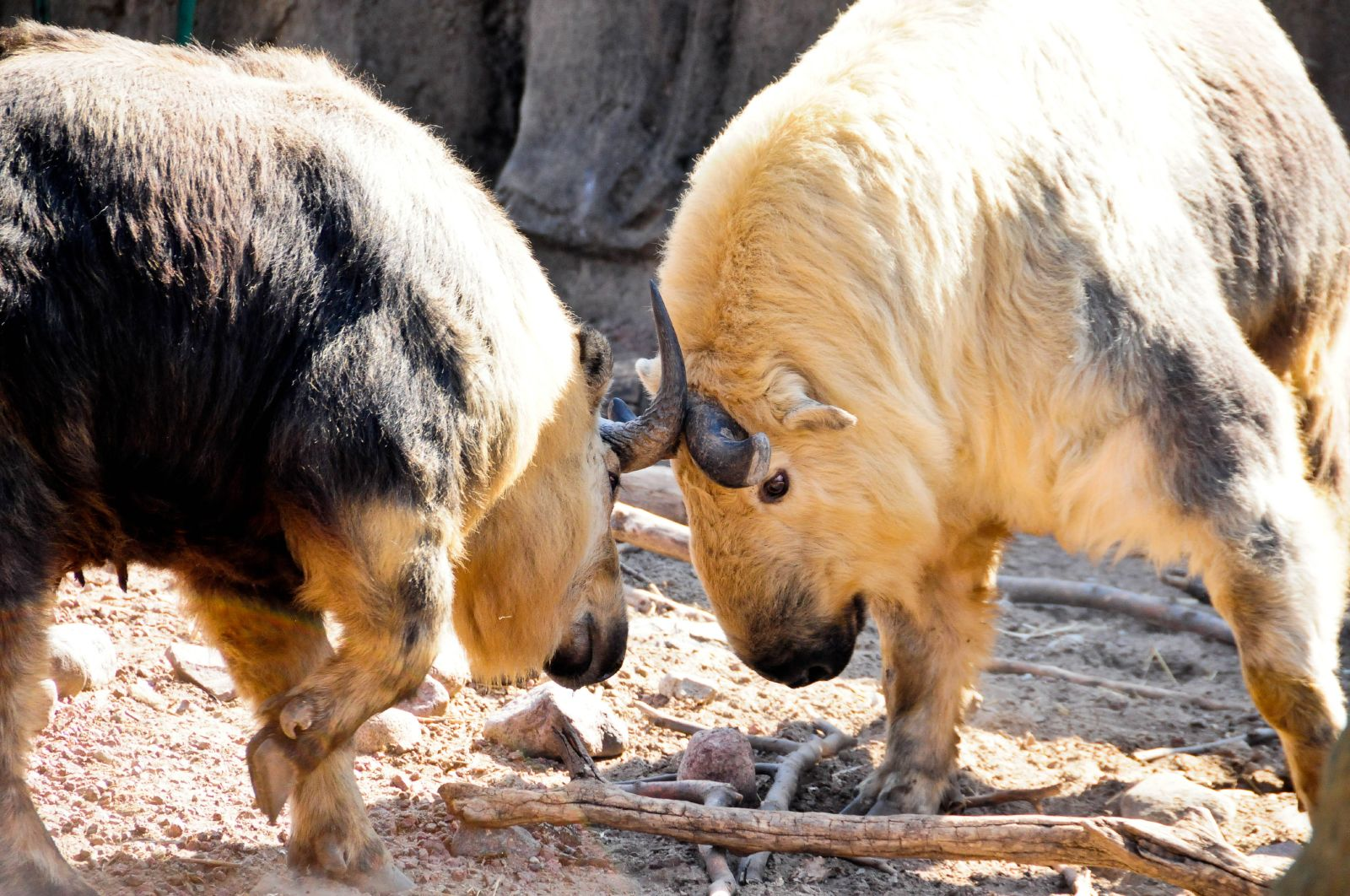
Sichuan takin (Budorcas taxicolor tibetana)

The zoo's 2.5 acre South Loop, built in 1982 on the south end of the main zoo, is an oval-shaped series of large grassland exhibits that house the zoo's diverse hoofstock and miscellaneous animals. During construction on Regenstein African Journey, it held the zoo's future Grant's gazelle collection. The South Loop has historically held several species, including the Arabian oryx, as part of the animals' complex Species Survival Plan, and briefly a pair of sable antelope in 2011. The most recent additions, however, are the waterbuck from Africa and a rarity in an American zoo, the endangered Sichuan takin.

The zoo has been successful with breeding the Sichuan takin—two baby takin were born together at the zoo in January and February 2013 and were named Xing Fu ("happy good fortune") and Mengyao ("superior handsomeness") after a poll on the Lincoln Park Zoo website. A baby kangaroo was born December 9, 2013, and later named Jack by nine-year-old Olivia Holness of Chicago.

List of animals
- Bactrian camel
- Chacoan peccary
- Common ostrich
- Grévy's zebra
- Père David's deer
- Red kangaroo
- Sichuan takin

=== Waterfowl Lagoon ===
A lagoon for waterfowl features the zoo's familiar flock of almost fifty Chilean flamingos, who use the exhibit's mudflaps to build nests and use the indoor Flamingo Habitat, sometimes referred to as the Flamingo Dome, during the winter to hide from the cold. It is also home to swan geese.

List of animals
- Chilean flamingo
- Swan goose

=== Hope B. McCormick Swan Pond ===
Lincoln Park Zoo began with the gift of a pair of swans, and to commemorate its founding and that special moment in history, a pair of trumpeter swans have continued to make their home at the zoo, now in the Hope B. McCormick Swan Pond, as a reminder of the zoo's long history. Several diverse species of waterfowl call this pond home.

List of animals
- Barrow's goldeneye
- Hooded merganser
- Northern pintail
- Ruddy duck
- Trumpeter swan

=== Farm-in-the-Zoo ===
The Farm-in-the-Zoo Presented by John Deere is across the South Pond from the rest of the zoo, and is designed to "give Chicago Kids a chance to experience a bit of the country in the city." Opened in 1964, it exhibits pigs, cows, horses and other domestic animals. Visitors can pet and feed the animals and roam vegetable gardens. Each day, the cows are milked in public and staff are on hand to explain other elements of farm life. Interactive exhibits allow guests to "hatch" from an egg, learn about farm weather, and about gardening.

List of animals
- Chicken
- Cattle
- Domestic rabbit
- Goat
- Pig
- Pony
- Western honey bee

=== Pepper Family Wildlife Center ===
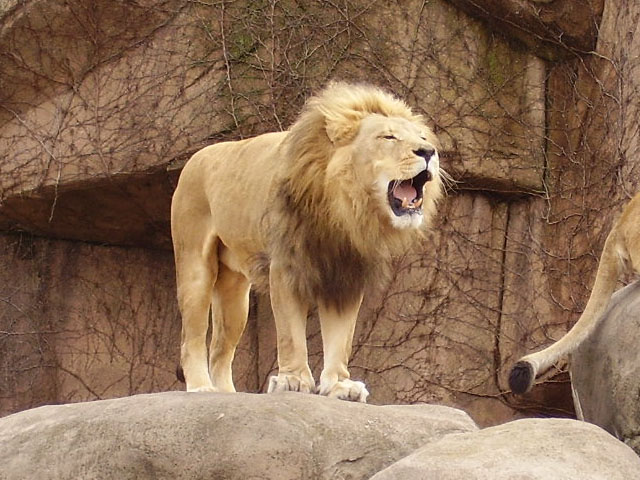
Adelor, a male African lion in the Lincoln Park Zoo

A historic zoo landmark first built in 1912, the Kovler Lion House building stands at the heart of the zoo near its entrance, and has housed a variety of big cat species over the years, most notably many lions as well as Siberian tigers, which inhabited two grottos on the northern exterior of the building, each having access to multiple indoor areas alongside the interior main hall, and a glass window viewing areas on the end of each grotto for guests to get a closer view. Other big cats, such as the jaguar, were allowed rotating access to two to three indoor window exhibits at a time. The southern exterior included five lush habitats that housed a variety of different cat species over the years. In addition, they also held a pair of red pandas, which were part of the Species Survival Plan. The indoor area also has a large gift shop where visitors can purchase plush toys of big cats, bears, and other animals.

Many of the species in the southern habitats shifted over the years, including Amur leopards, Eurasian lynxes, a Pallas's cat, and a puma in the exhibit's later years, with the last major addition being a one-year-old snow leopard named Taza who arrived on December 11, 2014.

One of the exhibit's notable residents was Adelor the African lion, who lived at the zoo from 1995 until his death in February 2012 and was one of the zoo's most popular animals. Upon his death, an anonymous donor paid for a statue of Adelor which now stands at the East Gate. He was succeeded by a male lion named Sahar, who turned four in January 2014. Another notable individual was a beloved black leopard, Marta, who was euthanized due to kidney problems in 2010. The zoo was also once known for having some of the only Asiatic lions in the United States, but these were later found to have received African-Asian hybrids.

In 2016, the zoo announced a $30 million renovation of the habitat as part of the Pride of Chicago fundraising campaign, acknowledging the public perception problems of the historic building, and confirming that the focus would be a more naturalistic space for African lions, along with spaces for the Canada lynx, Snow leopards, and red pandas. The exhibit closed in 2019 for the renovation and reopened as the Pepper Family Wildlife Center in the fall of 2021.

On March 15/16, 2022, a male lion cub was born following a 3 1/2 to 4-month gestation period. The cub is named Pilipili, meaning Pepper in Swahili language, and he is the offspring of lioness Zari and male Jabari. It was the zoo's first lion cub birth in 20 years. Three additional lion cubs were born January 9, 2023 to the same African lion pairing, bringing the total number of lions in the pride up to eight.

List of animals
- African lion
- Canada lynx
- Red panda
- Snow leopard

== Former exhibits ==
=== Bear Habitat ===
Video of Anana the polar bear swimming

The Robert R. McCormick Bear Habitat, or "Bear Line", sat directly next to Regenstein African Journey, and housed many carnivores over the years in a number of naturalistic exhibits with trees, water falls, rocky grottos and climbing structures for bears and wolves to use. At the north end is the 266,000-gallon polar bear pool and underwater window, one of the largest polar bear habitats in the world. The zoo received two polar bears, brother and sister Lee and Anana, in 2001, but currently only Anana remains, as Lee was sent to the Detroit Zoo to assist in a breeding program. The only other remaining member of the bear line is a single Malayan sun bear. The zoo was also home to two elderly spectacled bears, Goliath and Manny that have since been sent to another zoo, as have the spotted hyenas. The exhibit used to house the maned wolf and Mexican wolf but both species were removed when the Pritzer Family Children's Zoo opened its own red wolf habitat in 2005.

The exhibit closed in winter 2014 as work began on the new polar bear and penguin habitats over the same site. The habitat re-opened in late 2016.

=== Penguin-Seabird Exhibit ===
First opened in 1981/1982, the zoo's historic Aquatic Bird House featured two main theater-style galleries. The first featured three species of penguin—the rockhopper, chinstrap and king penguins, all in an 18,000-gallon, temperature-controlled pool, with a chilly temperature of around forty degrees Fahrenheit for the air and water, while a computer system imitates the natural daylight cycle penguins experience in the wild. The second gallery featured tufted puffins, common murres and razorbills swimming in a 10,000-gallon pool based on the North Atlantic coast, where the birds made their homes on rocky cliffs. The historic building closed on December 5, 2011, and has been replaced with Regenstein Macaque Forest. The sixty-six birds that lived in the previous exhibit were moved to eleven other locations, including the Shedd Aquarium, the St. Louis Zoo, the Detroit Zoo, the Central Park Zoo and the Oregon Coast Aquarium A new African penguin habitat was built by the current site of the Robert McCormick Bear Habitat, and opened in 2016.

== Gallery ==
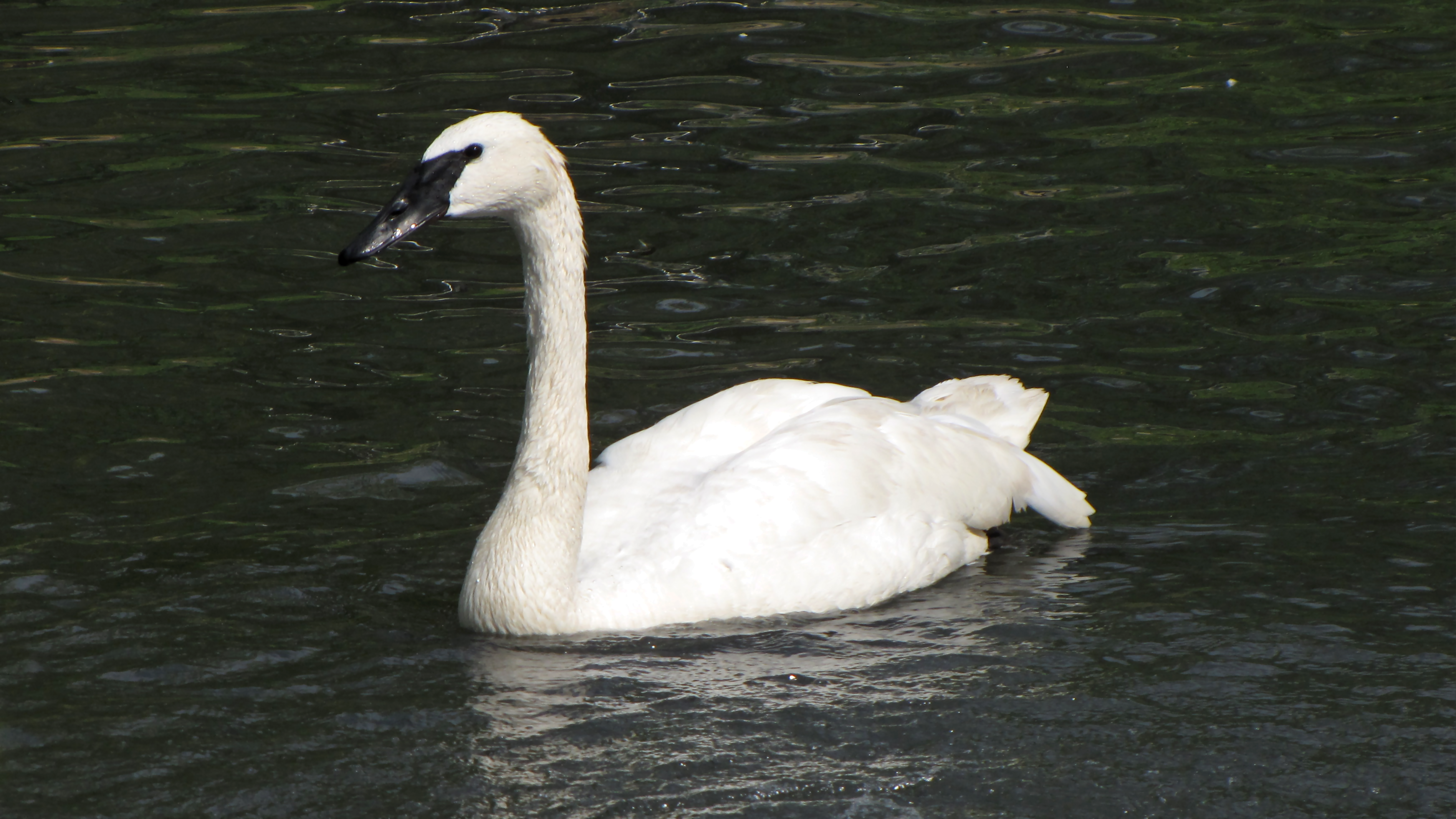
The trumpeter swans were the first gifts that founded the zoo and still present at the zoo.

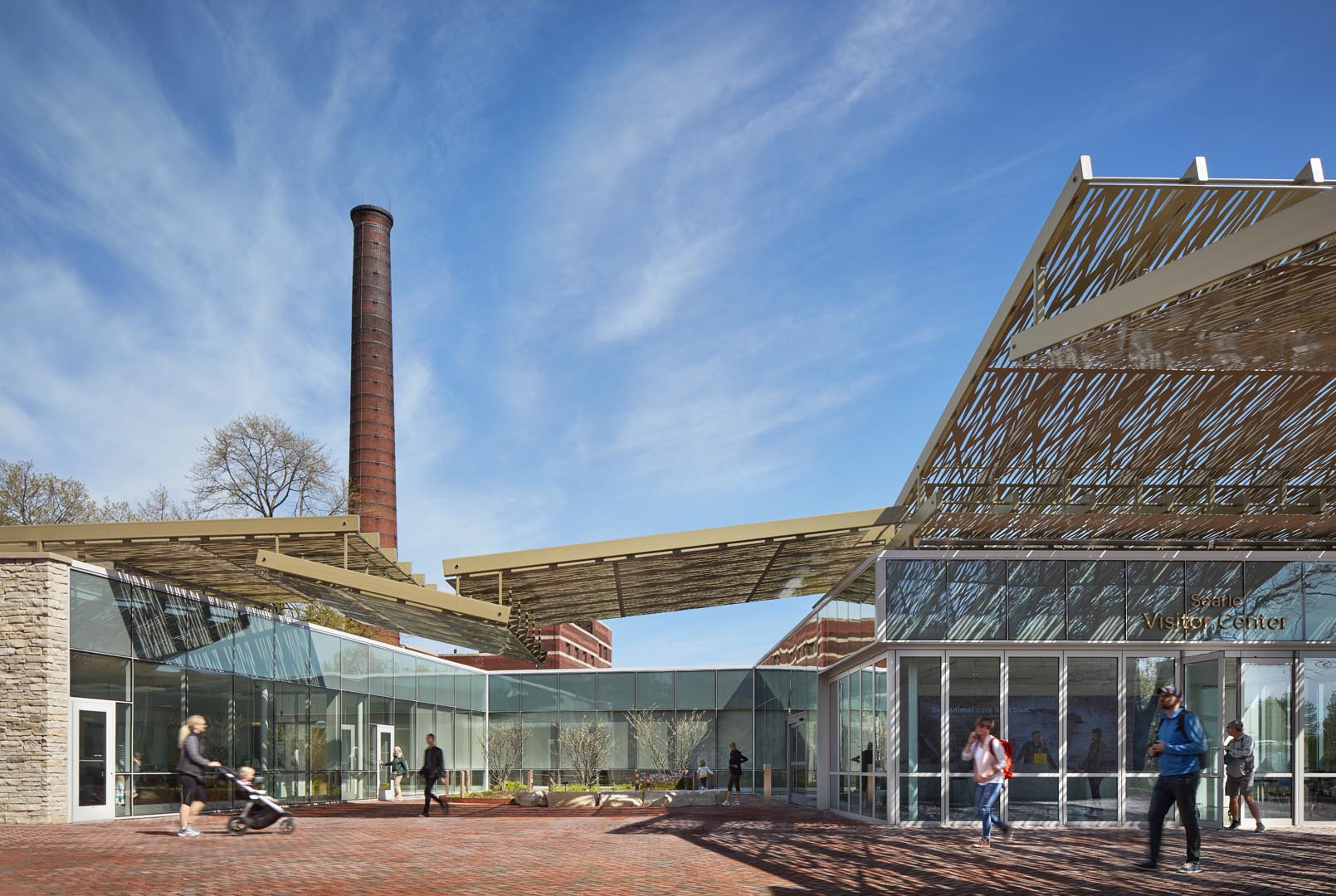
Lincoln Park Zoo's Visitor Center

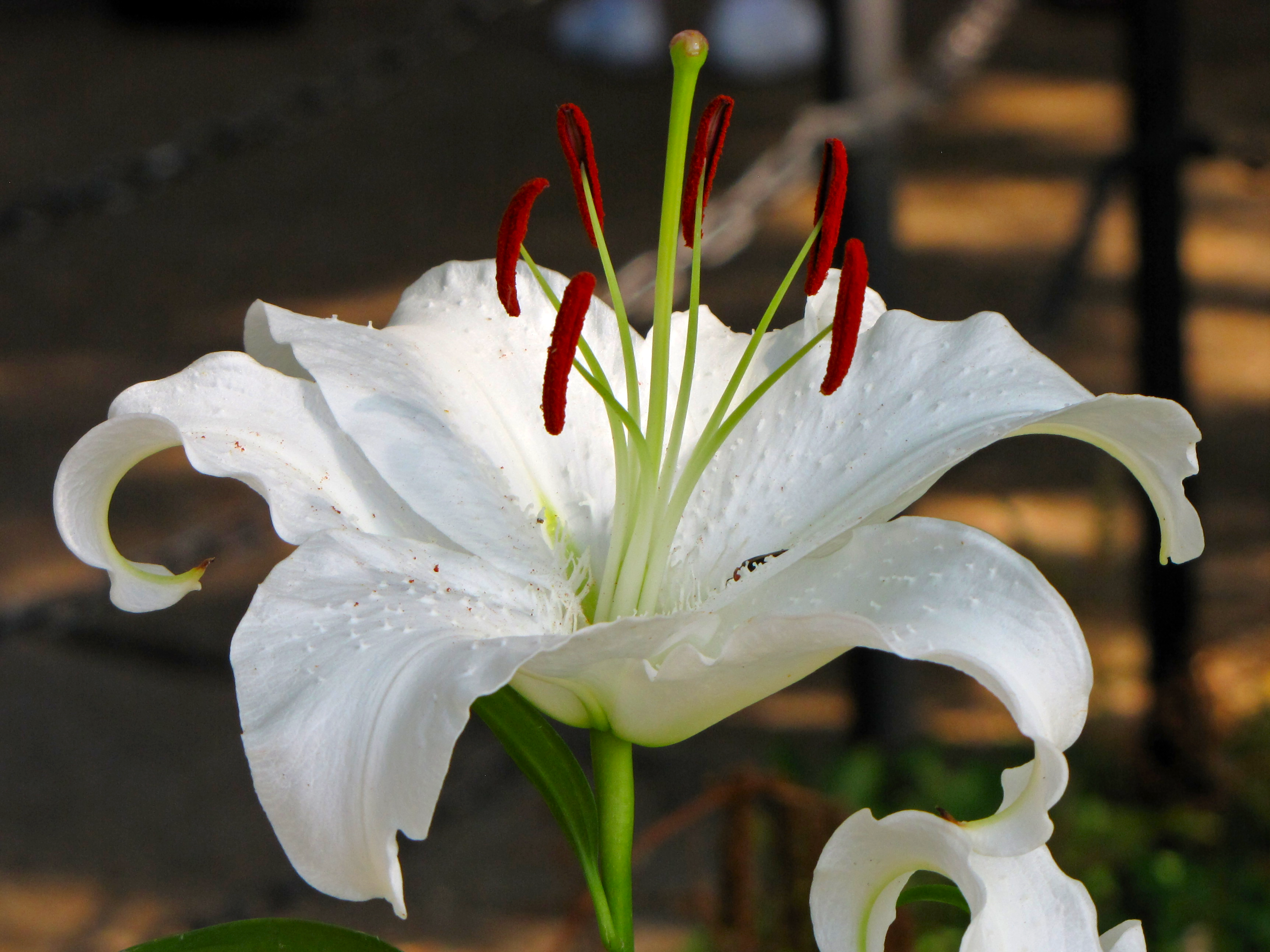
A lily in bloom, one of the many plants at the zoo

Giraffe exhibit

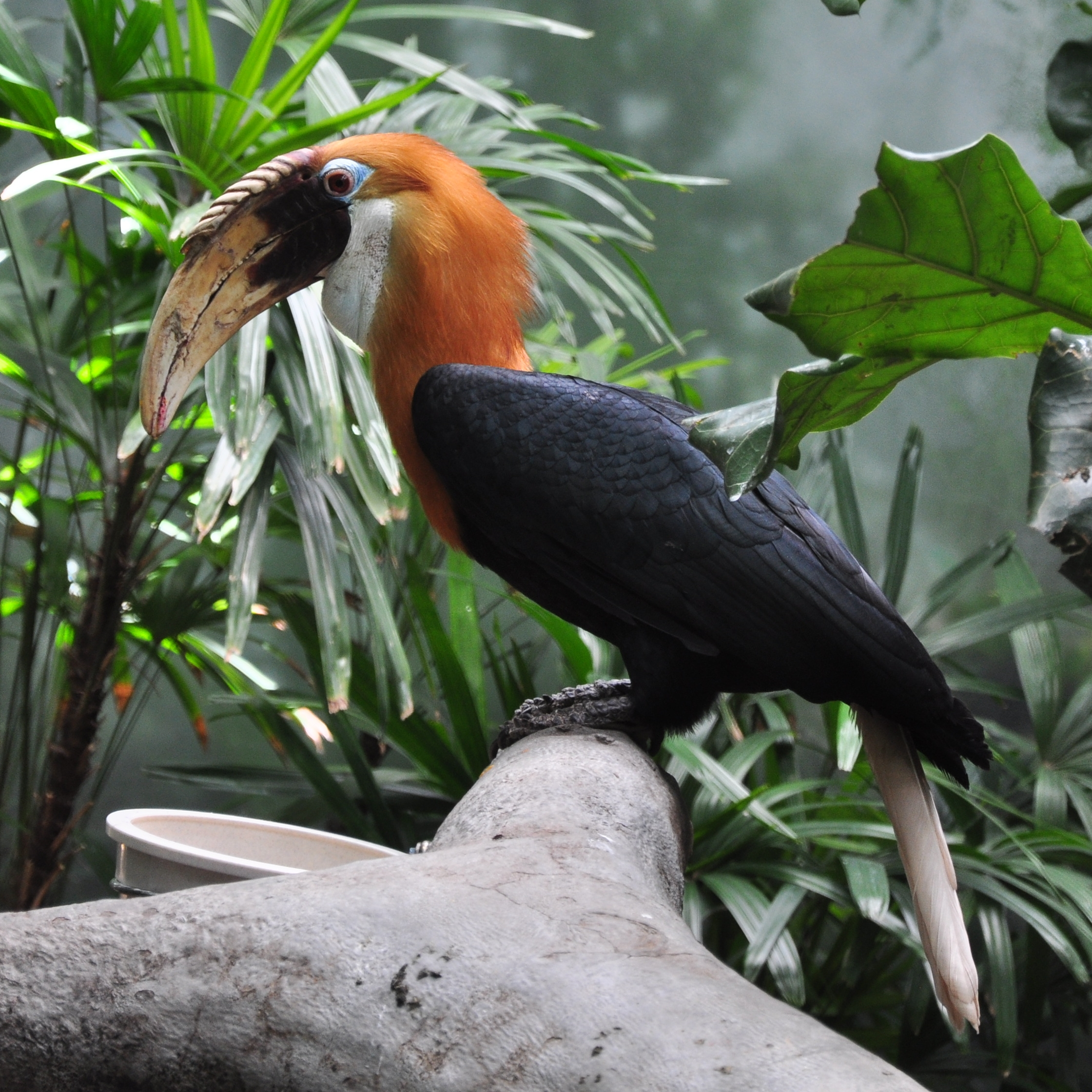
Blyth's hornbill (Rhyticeros plicatus)

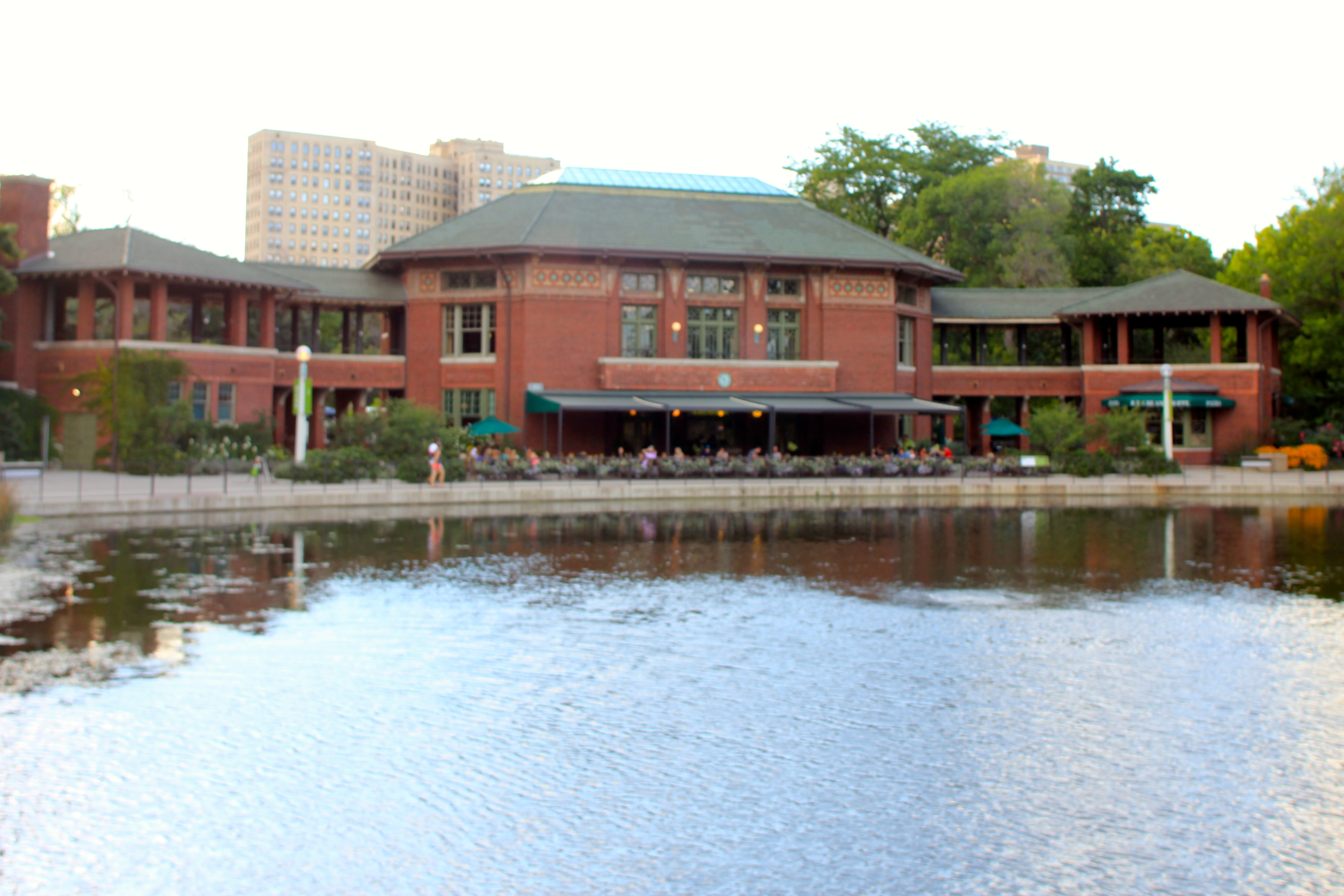
Cafe Brauer at the Nature Boardwalk

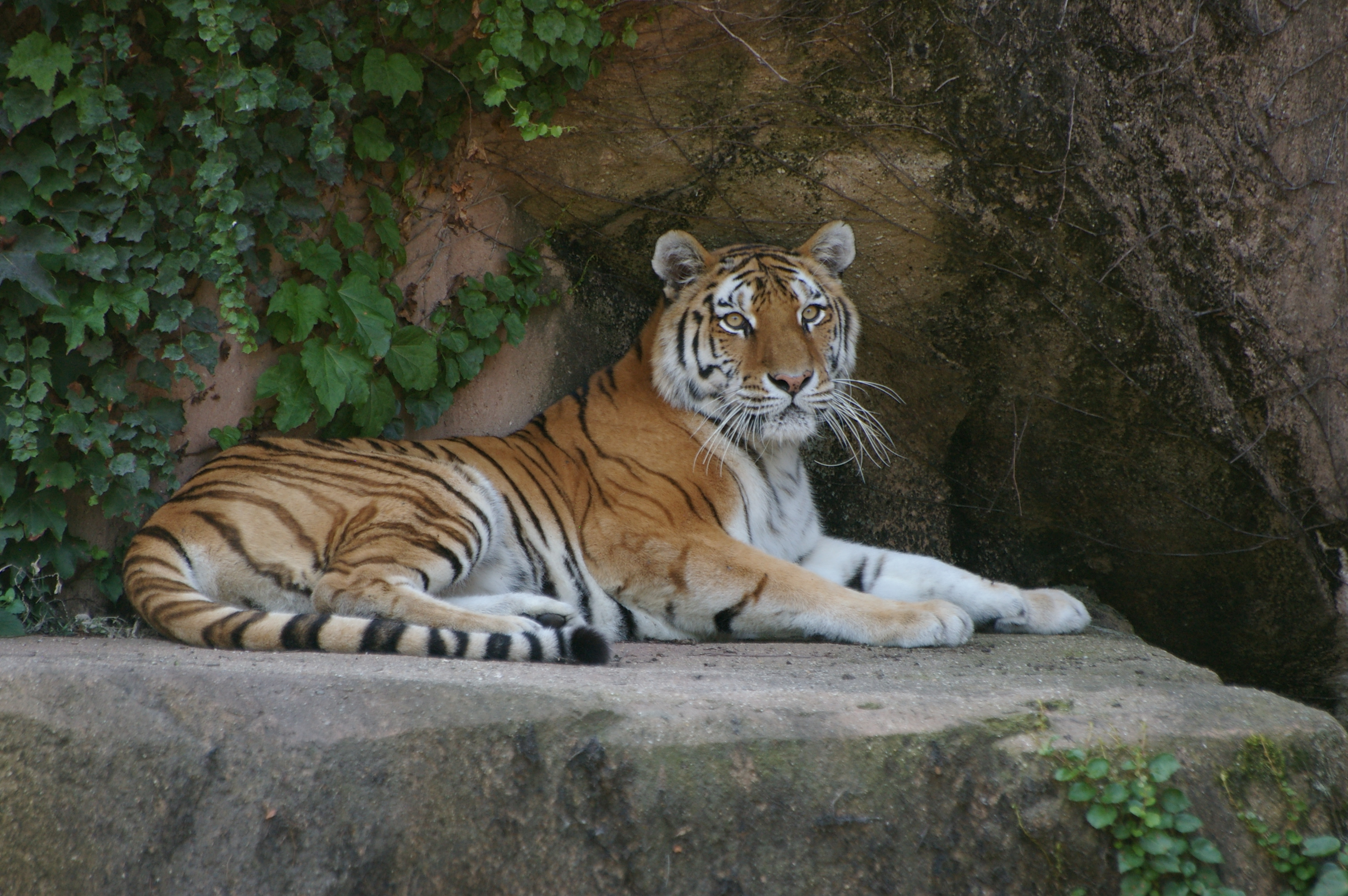
Siberian tiger at the zoo

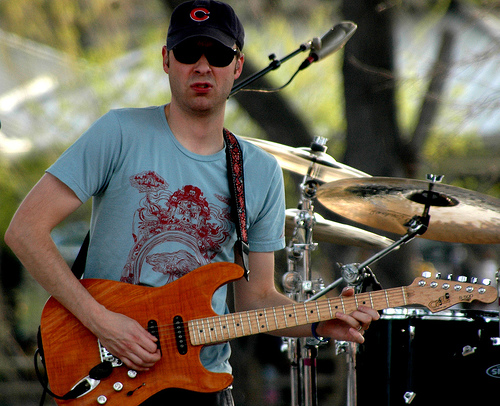
Concert at the zoo on Earth Day

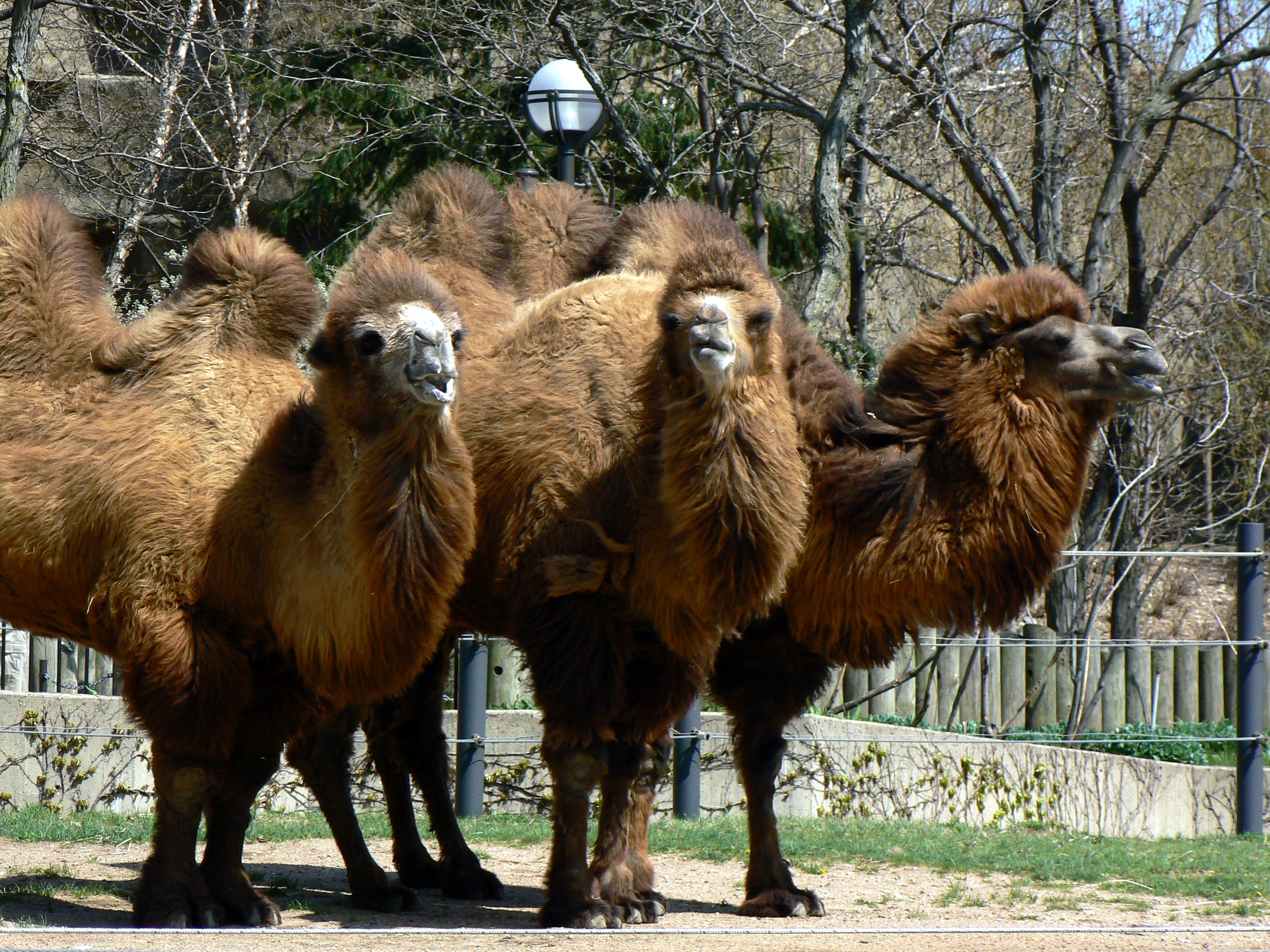
Bactrian camels (Camelus bactrianus)

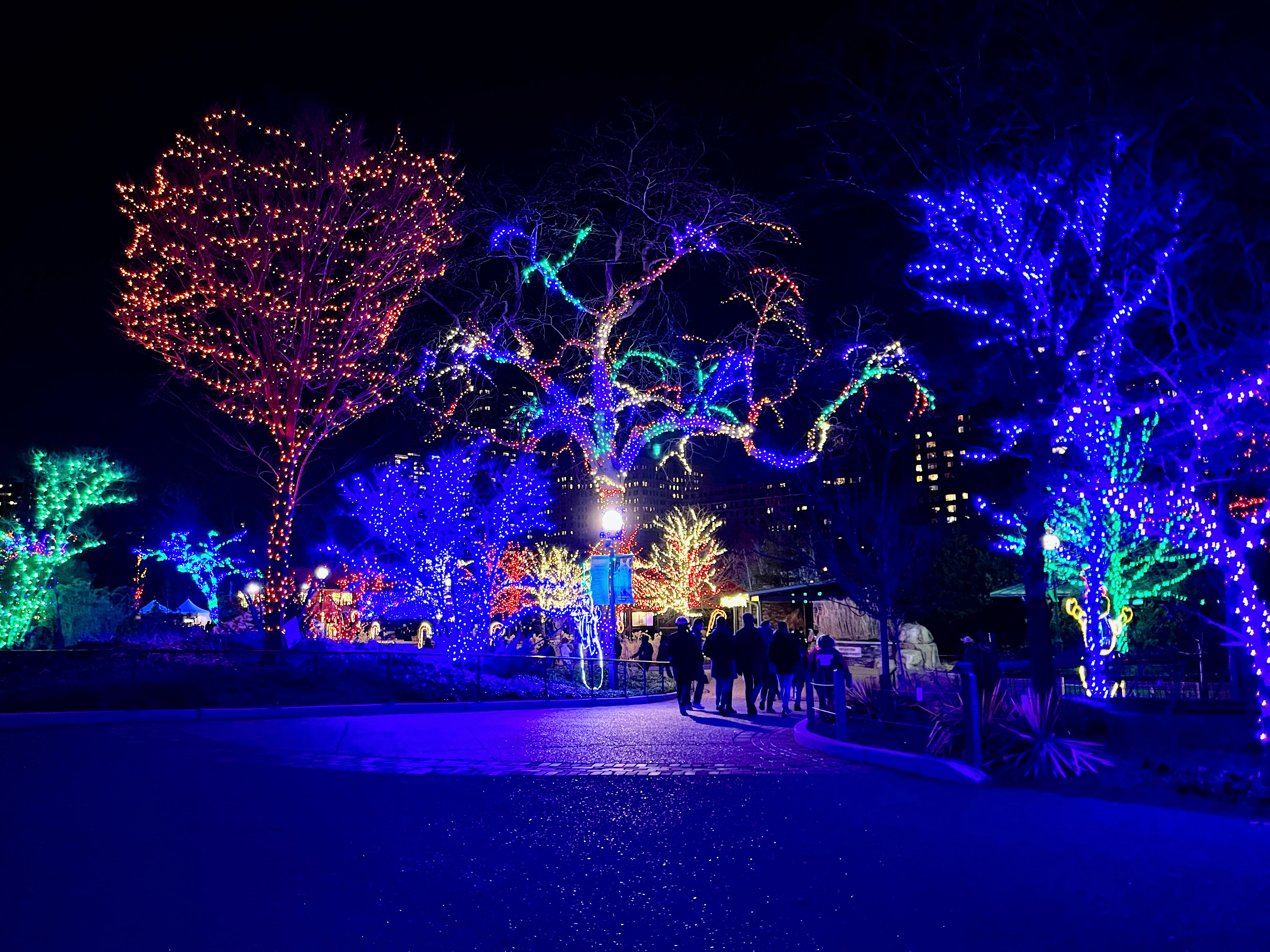
The annual Zoolights tradition

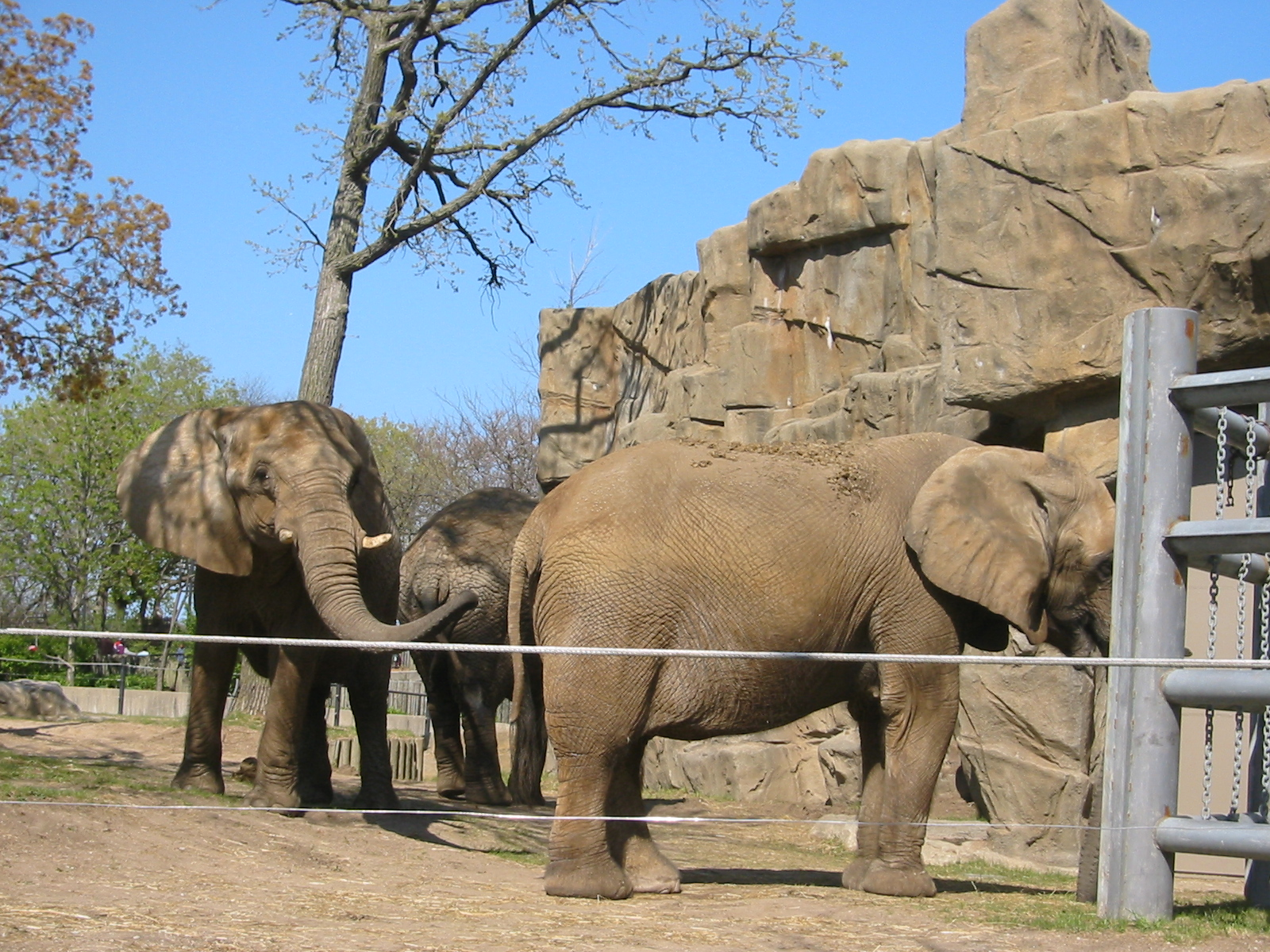
Former elephant exhibit

== See also ==
- List of museums and cultural institutions in Chicago
