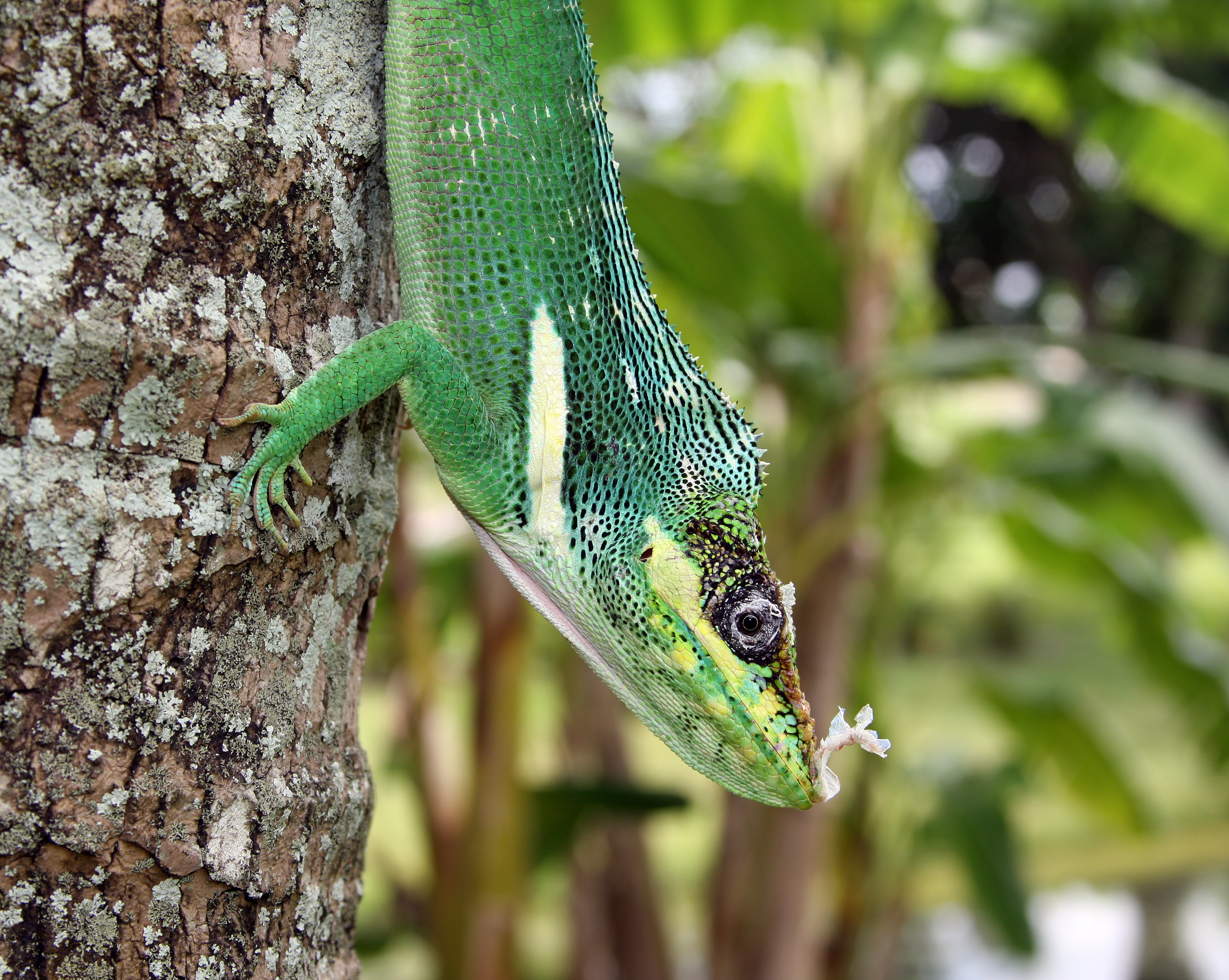

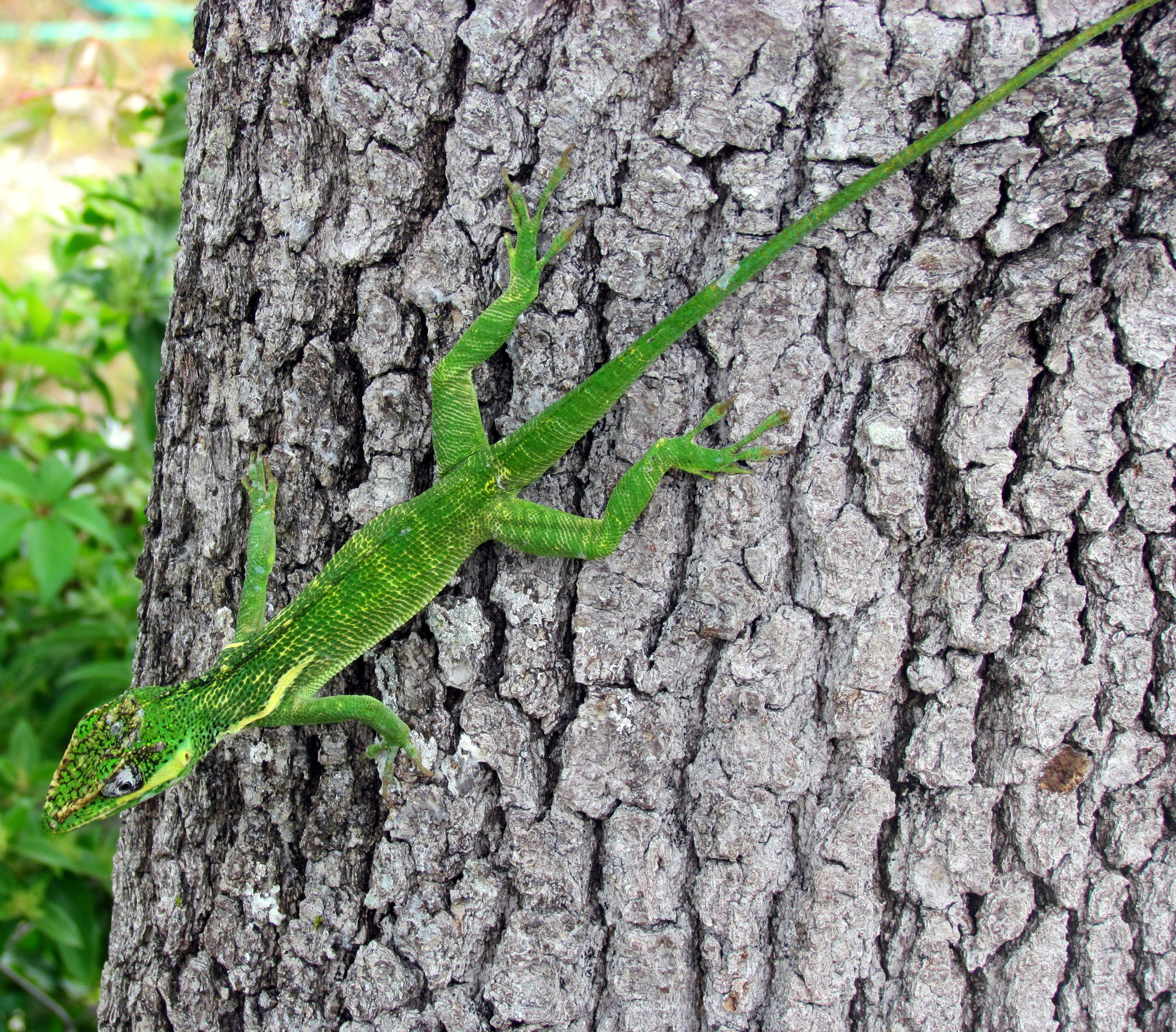

Conservation status
- Least Concern (IUCN 3.1)

Scientific classification
- Kingdom: Animalia
- Phylum: Chordata
- Class: Reptilia
- Order: Squamata
- Suborder: Iguania
- Family: Anolidae
- Genus: Anolis
- Species: A. equestris

Binomial name
- Anolis equestris Merrem, 1820

Synonyms
- Anolis equestris subsp. santamariae Garrido, 1975; Anolius rhodolaemus Bell, 1827; Deiroptyx equestris (Merrem, 1820)

= Knight anole =

Species of lizard

The knight anole (Anolis equestris) is the largest species of anole (US: /əˈnoʊ.li/) in the Dactyloidae family. Other common names include Cuban knight anole or Cuban giant anole, highlighting its native country, but it has also been introduced to Florida. In its native Cuba, this large anole is called chipojo or chupacocote.

== Taxonomy ==
The knight anole is part of a group of overall similar (in both appearance and behavior, all are crown-giant ecomorphs) anoles from Cuba known as the equestris species complex, including A. baracoae, A. luteogularis, A. noblei, A. pigmaequestris and A. smallwoodi.

These and a few other anole species from Cuba, Hispaniola and Puerto Rico are sometimes placed in their own genus, Deiroptyx.

== Distribution and habitat ==
Knight anoles are native to Cuba, but have been widely introduced into South Florida, where they reproduce and spread readily as an invasive species. The original introduction to Florida occurred in 1952 on the campus of the University of Miami in Coral Gables. They cannot withstand cold temperatures; in winter freezes in Florida, they have been known to fall to the ground from tree canopies, similarly to the green iguana. In highland parts of its native Cuba, a few individuals may rest adjacent to each other during the relatively cold winters (otherwise the species is solitary and highly territorial).

In Cuba they can be seen from near sea level to an altitude of 3,300 ft (1,000 m) in a wide range of habitats with trees, such as forest, mangrove, savanna, cultivated areas and gardens. In its introduced Florida range it even occurs in trees along roads in Miami. Knight anoles are arboreal, mostly found high in trees on the trunk or branches in the canopy, but will descend to the ground to get from one tree to another, or for thermoregulation, when occasionally seen on warm asphalt, rocks, or sidewalks.

== Description ==
Adult knight anoles are about 13–20 in (33–51 cm) in total length, including their tail that is longer than the head-and-body, and weigh 0.56–4.83 oz (16–137 g). Males grow larger than females, with adults of the former having a snout–vent length of 3.9–7.5 in (10–19 cm) and the latter 3.5–6.3 in (9–16 cm). It is mostly bright green with a yellow stripe on the side of the head and another on the shoulder, but it is able to perform some color changes. It has a pinkish-white dewlap. Juveniles have light bands on the body.

== Behavior ==
Knight anoles are diurnal and fiercely territorial. Initially they turn to face almost any perceived threat, if only from a distance. During its challenge display, a lizard will sit high on all fours, gape menacingly, turn green, and perhaps bob its head. The male will extend its dewlap, and both females and males will "puff themselves up" with air.

== Diet ==
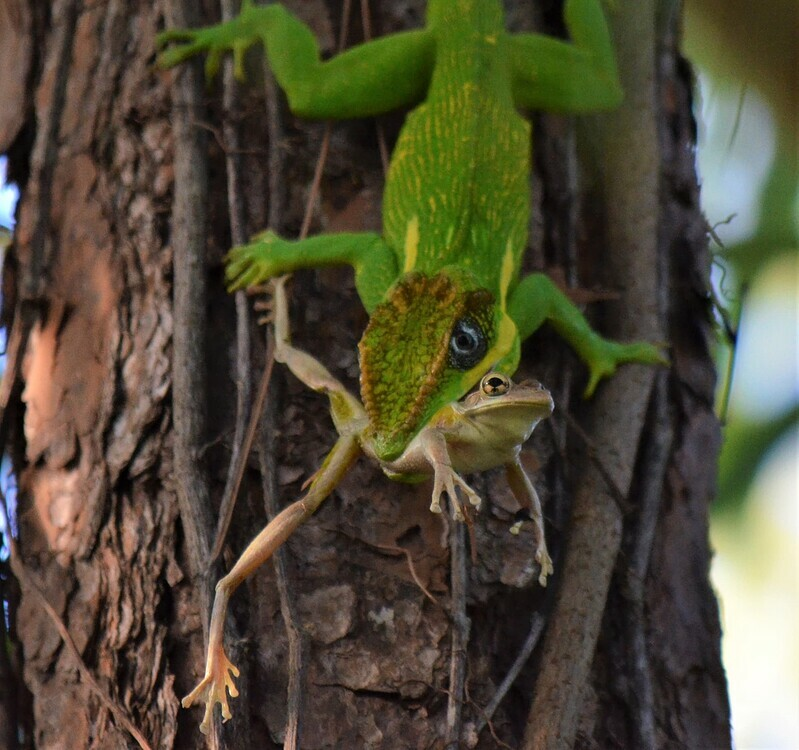
Eating a Cuban tree frog, in Florida

When they are young, their diet consists mainly of insects. As adults, they mostly eat invertebrates (notably insects and snails), but regularly take fruits and can function as a seed disperser. They may also take small vertebrate prey such as small birds and reptiles (including other anoles), but studies indicate that they do this less frequently than several other anole species.

== Captivity ==
In captivity, the anole's aggressiveness seems to lessen to a certain degree; if it is raised from the time of its birth and handled, it is common for it to become tame enough to be held. In communal terraria with other species of lizards, it rarely attacks smaller lizards, unless the other reptile intrudes on its territory. It may be hand-fed with caution, since it has a strong bite and many small, sharp teeth.

== Gallery ==
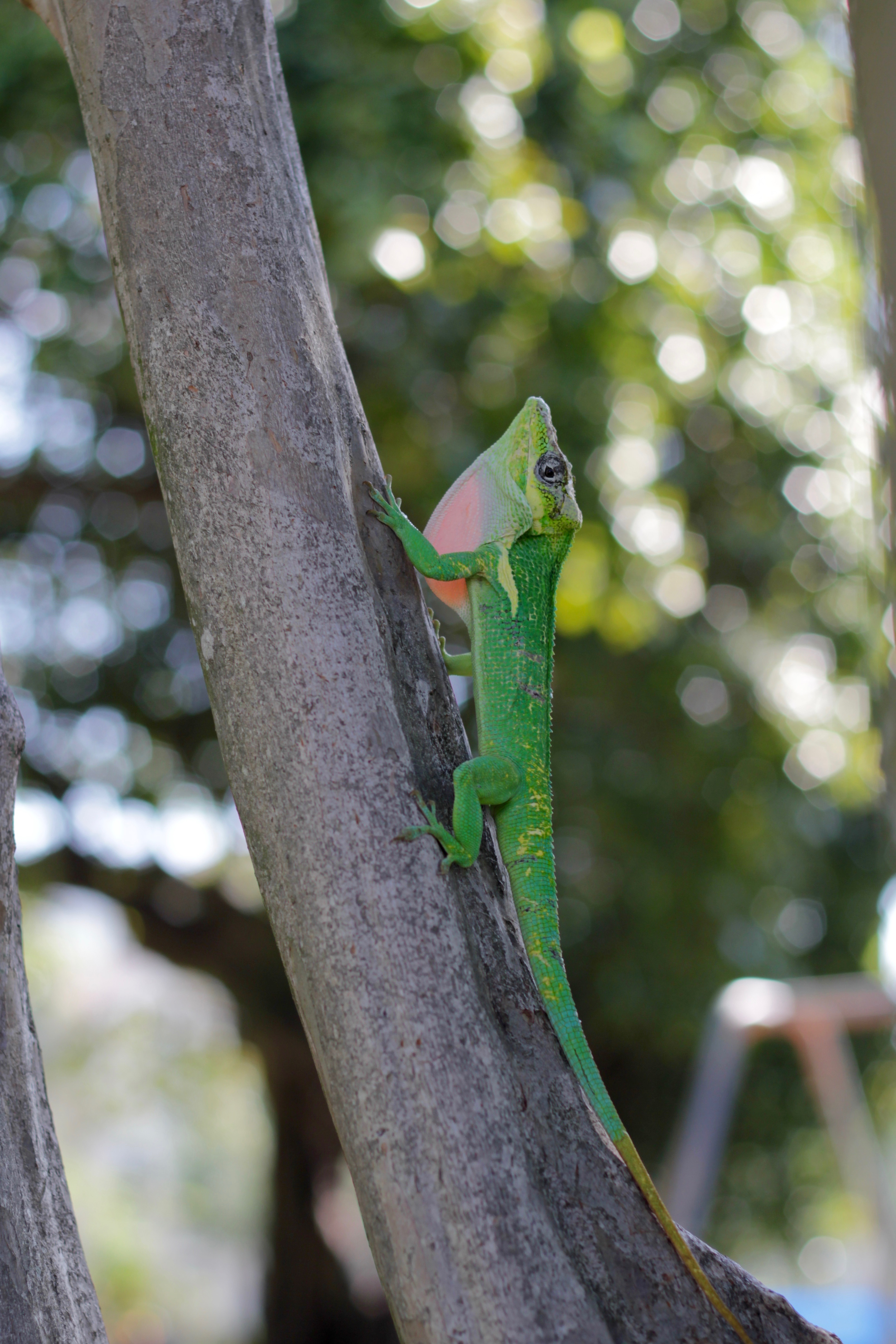
Displaying the pinkish-white dewlap

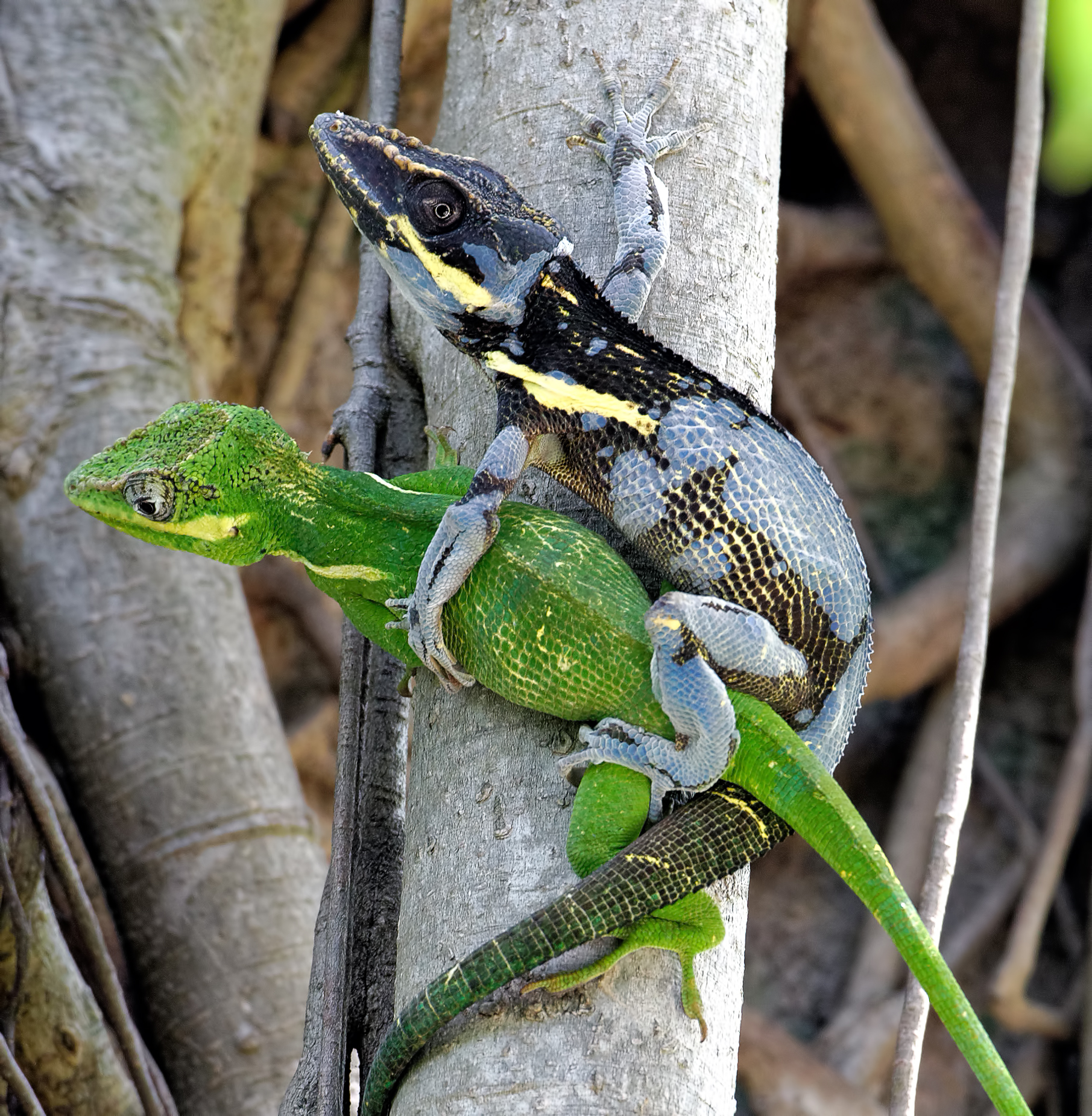
Mating knight anoles. The male has turned dark from the normal green color. The whitish-gray patches are old skin that is in the process of being shed

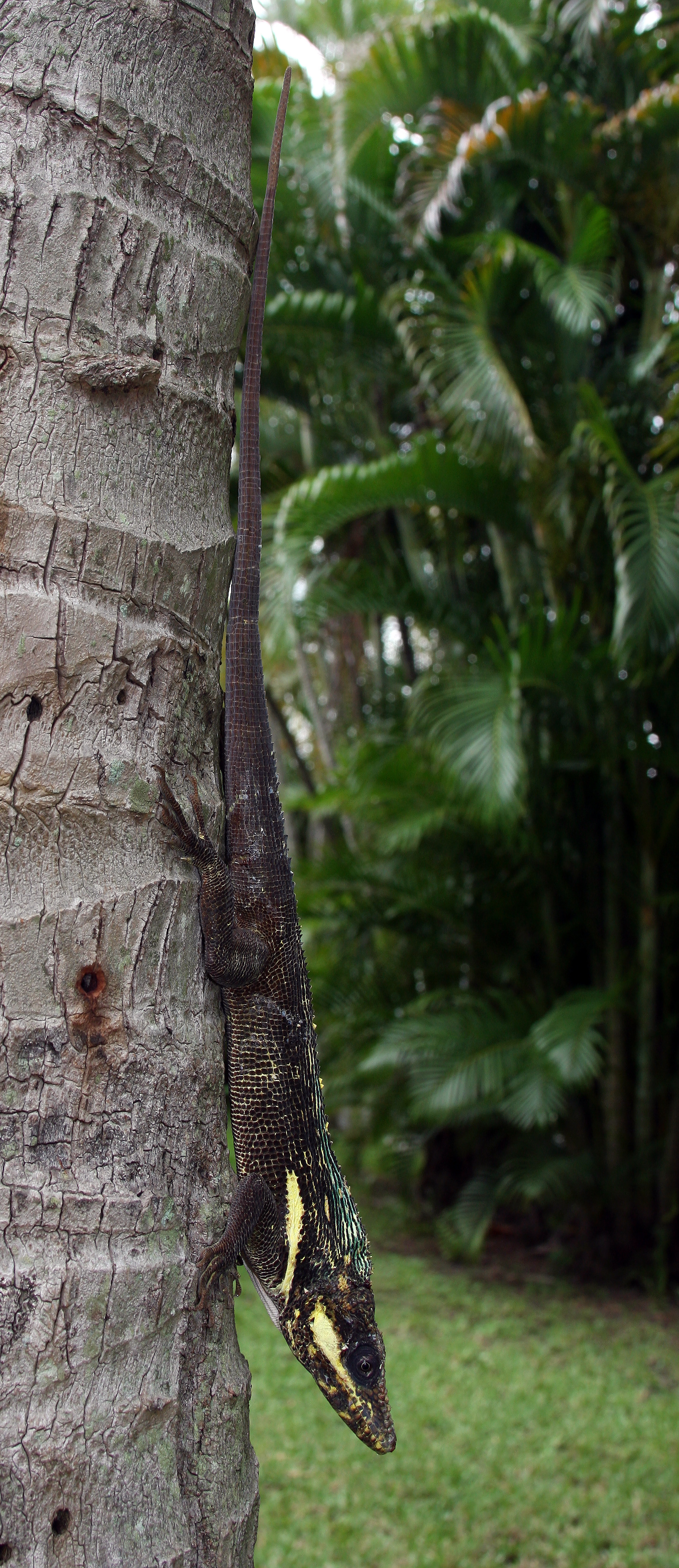
Showing dark colors after losing a territorial dispute

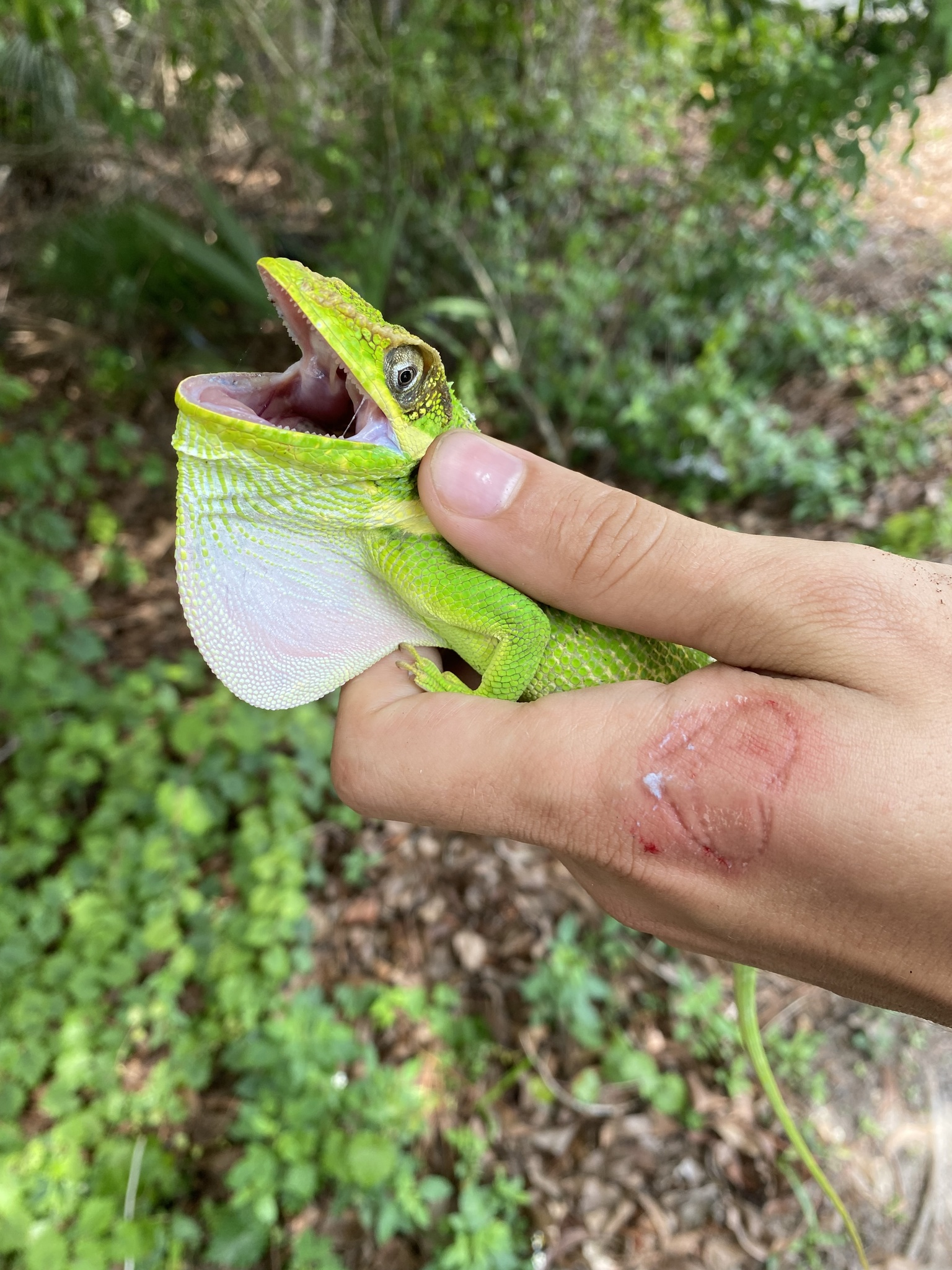
Threat display, with a bite mark visible on the handler's hand

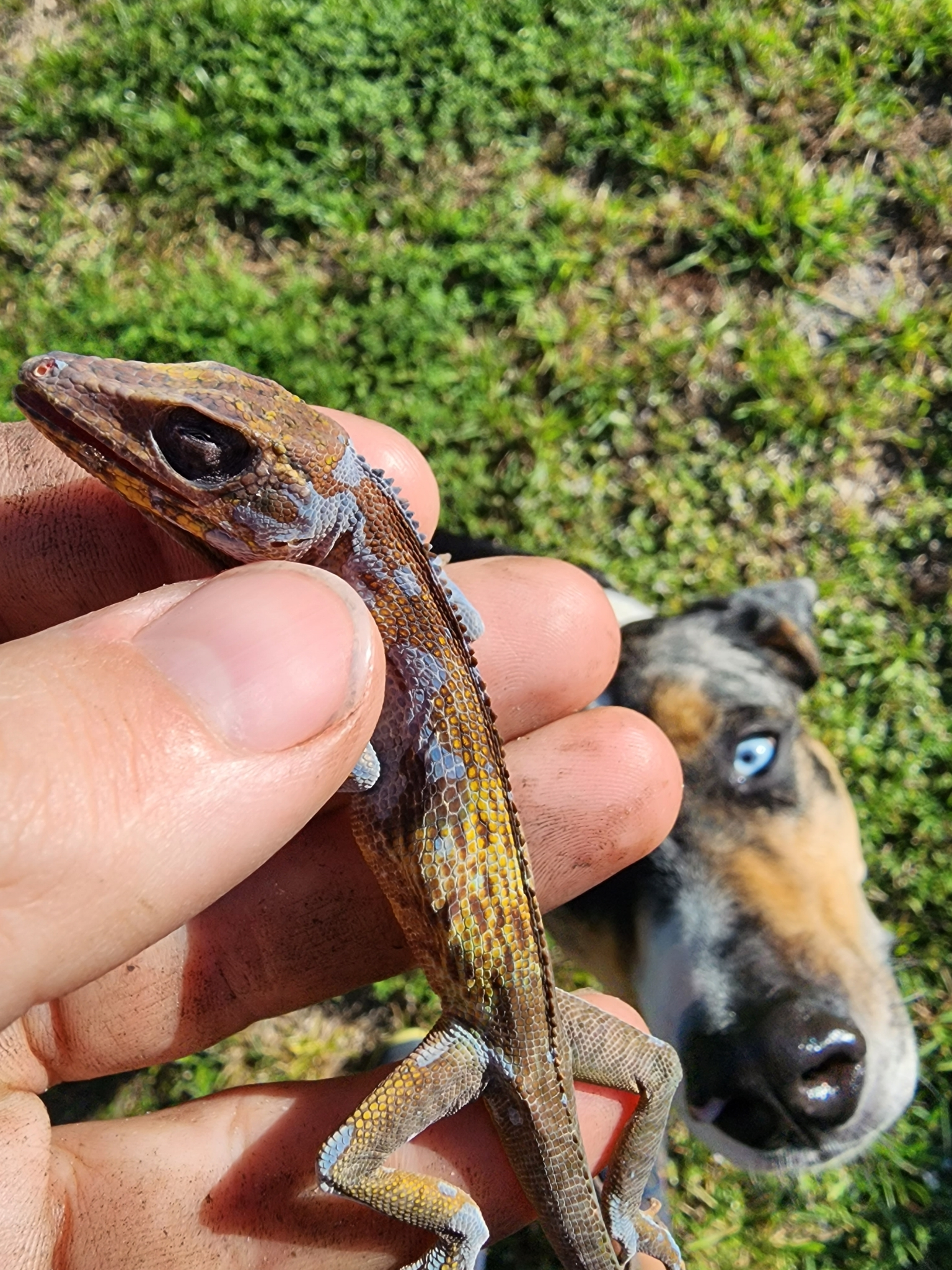
Showing blue colours when deceased

== See also ==
- List of Anolis lizards
