= Cuban anole =

Cuban anole may refer to:

- Anolis equestris, or Cuban knight anole, a species of anole
- Anolis sagrei, or Cuban brown anole, another species of anole
