= Nature Boardwalk =

Outdoor space managed by the Lincoln Park Zoo in Chicago

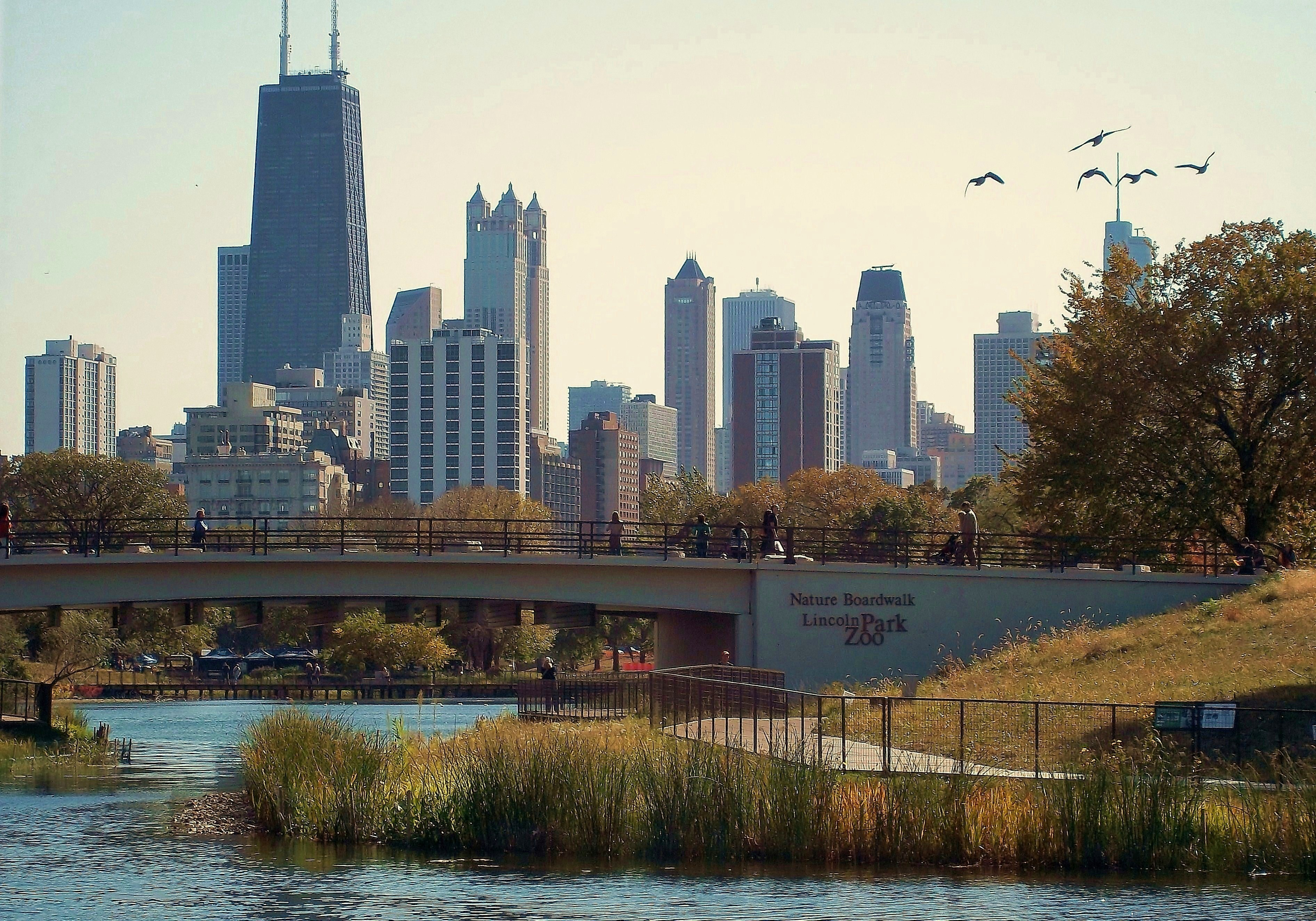
- The Nature Boardwalk in 2010
- Location: Chicago, Illinois, U.S.
- Location within Chicago metropolitan area
- Coordinates: 41°55′7″N 87°37′59″W

The Nature Boardwalk (also known as the Nature Boardwalk at Lincoln Park Zoo) is an outdoor space managed by the Lincoln Park Zoo, in Chicago's Lincoln Park, in the U.S. state of Illinois.

== Description and history ==
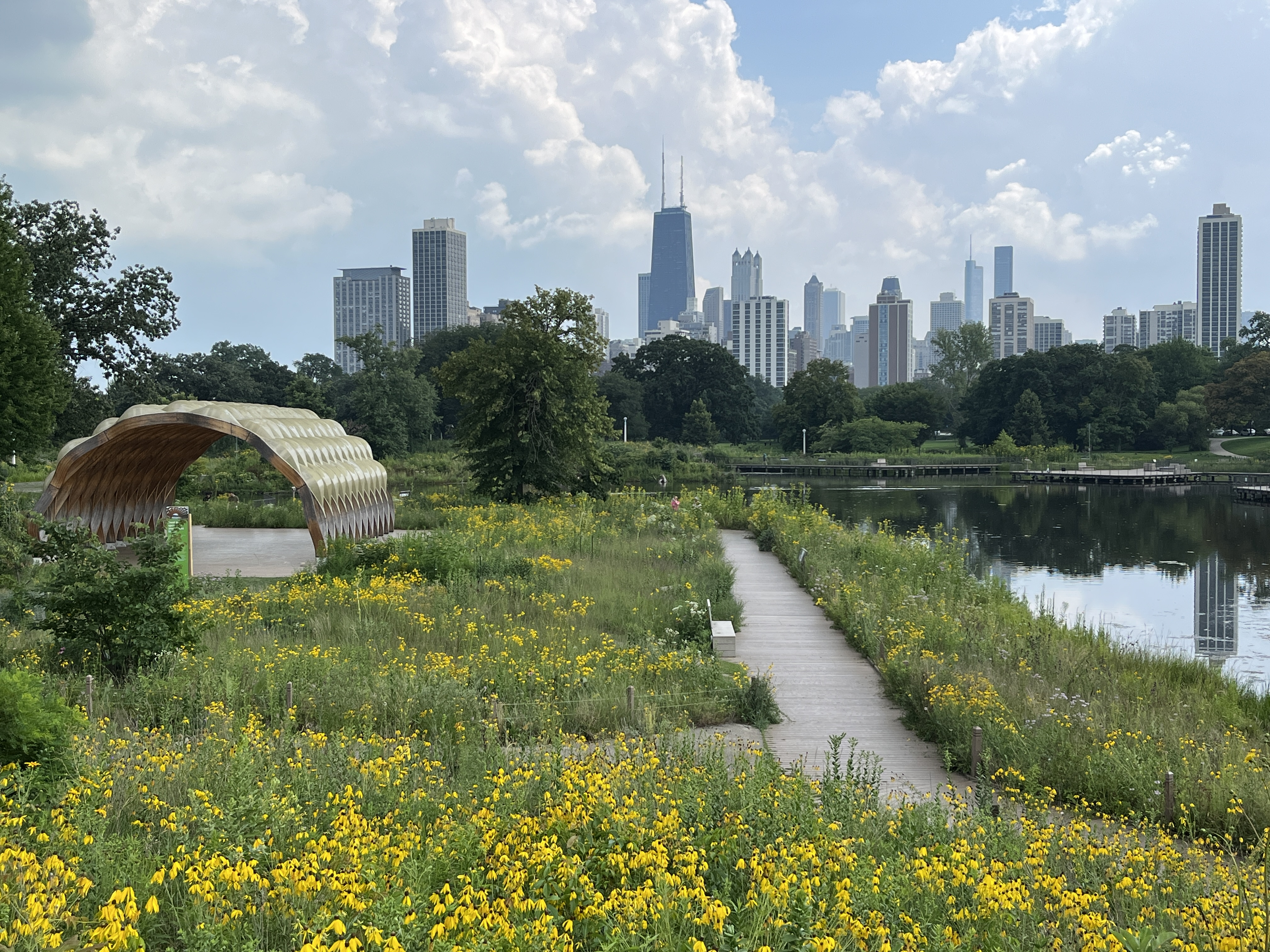
The boardwalk and pavilion, 2023

The ecological habitat was designed by Studio Gang and features a boardwalk surrounding a pond. There is also a pavilion designed to house educational activities, officially called the Peoples Gas Education Pavilion.

The boardwalk opened in 2010, as an improved version of the Zoo's manmade South Pond. Birds like the black-crowned night heron, as well as butterflies, fish, frogs, and turtles are present. Specific butterfly species include the monarch, viceroy, cabbage white, orange and clouded sulphur, red admiral, spring azure, black swallowtail, buckeye, and painted lady. The space also features grasses, benches, and views of the skyline.
