= Cy DeVry =

American zookeeper (1859–1934)

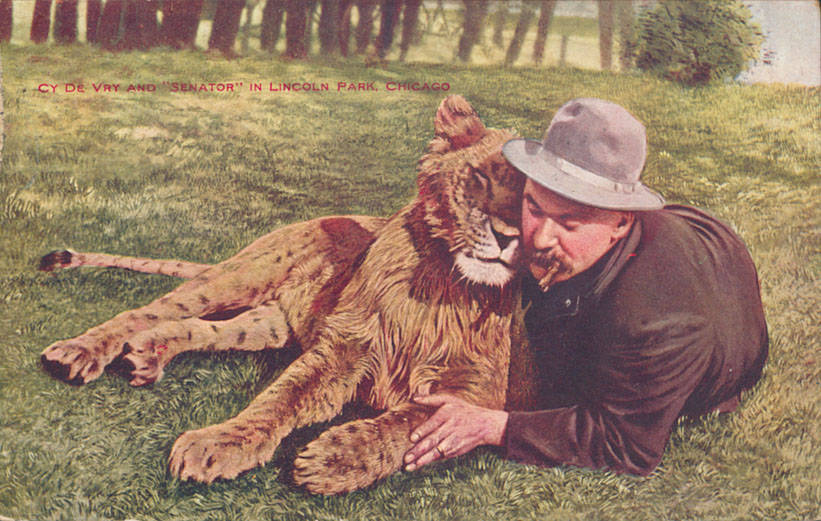
Cy DeVry and "Senator" in Lincoln Park.

Cyrus Barnard DeVry (1859–1934) was an American zookeeper. He was the first director of the Lincoln Park Zoo in Chicago, holding this position from 1888 to 1919.

== Career ==
DeVry was born in Harrisburg, Pennsylvania. He came to Chicago in part to succeed his uncle, Herman DeVry, who had overseen Lincoln Park until his death in 1888. When Cy DeVry took over the zoo in the park, it was a haphazard array of animal cages. Over the course of the 1890s he arranged for the construction of purpose-built structures such as an aviary, a monkey house, and a visitor center including a gift shop.

DeVry was a colorful personality, known for his ever-present cigar and tiger-tooth watch fob. Though popular with the public, his political independence and drinking habit made him enemies in Chicago politics. He was dismissed from his position in 1900, but was rehired in 1901 after a political shakeup at the parks commission.

Animal-handling methods of the time were crude and unsafe, and DeVry, who had been handling large animals from boyhood, was known as a hands-on zookeeper. He was seriously wounded on multiple occasions, most seriously in 1901 when Leo the lion bit off the end of his index finger. The wound healed poorly and DeVry was told that the hand might have to be amputated. Devastated, he attempted suicide by gunshot, but survived.

In two respects DeVry was an innovative zookeeper. In the first place, he believed that captive animals required stimulation and enrichment, although his methods were peculiar by today's standards. For instance, he kept his monkeys entertained by placing a pig in their enclosure. Although the pig provided plenty of diversion to the monkeys, the arrangement drew the ire of the Illinois Humane Society. DeVry was also an early example of a zoological ambassador. He gave frequent interviews, conducted animal publicity stunts, and innovated public relations techniques that would later be used by the likes of Jim Fowler and Joan Embery. For instance, he presented a bear cub during the pre-game at what became Wrigley Field, at the first home game of the Chicago Cubs.

In 1919 DeVry was fired after engaging in an altercation with a zoo visitor who had been pestering some young women. A petition protesting his dismissal attracted 50,000 signatures, but park commissioners determined that DeVry's presence was inimical to discipline. After leaving the Lincoln Park Zoo, DeVry accepted a position at the East Los Angeles menagerie of William Selig.
