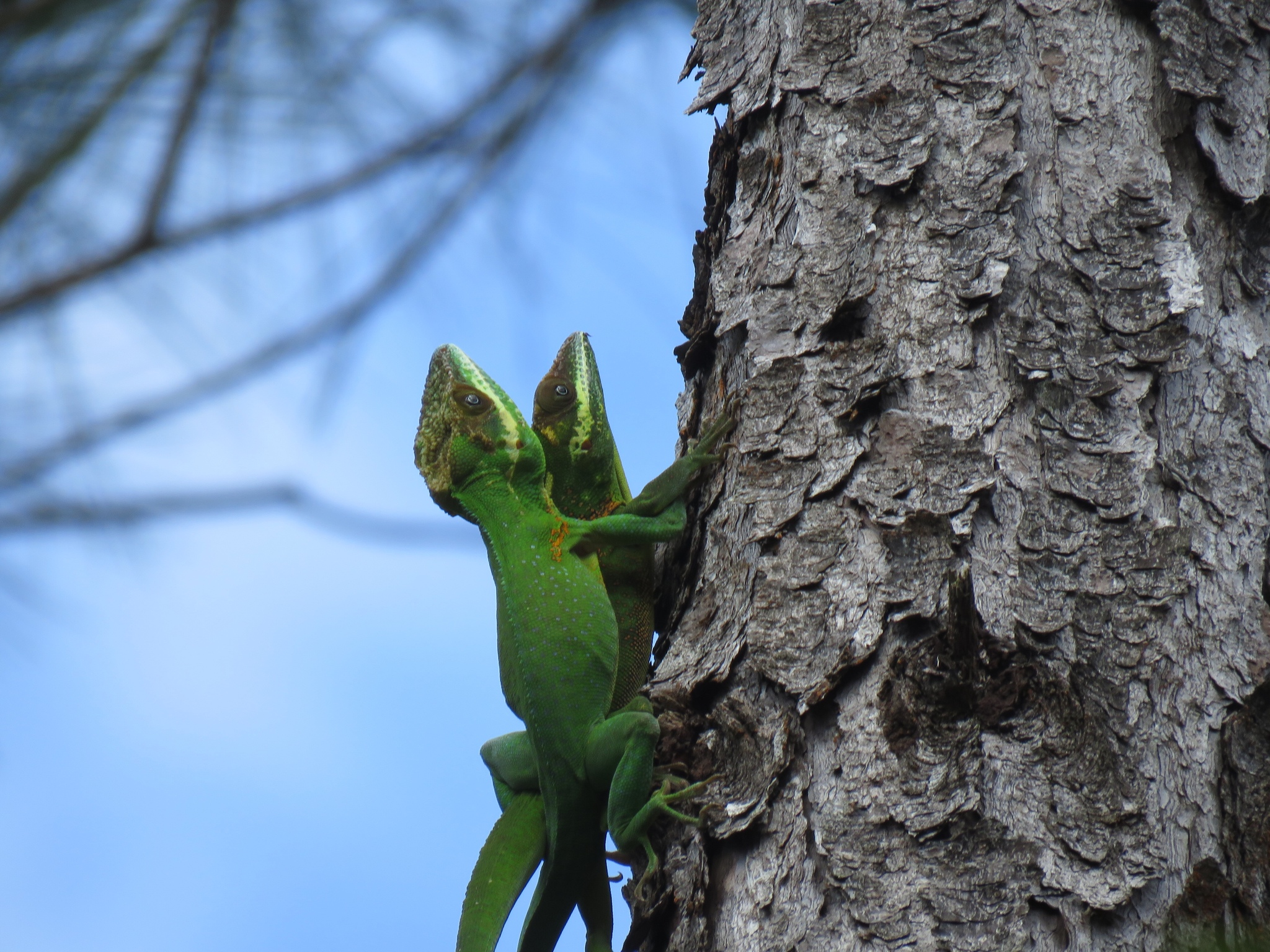

Conservation status
- Near Threatened (IUCN 3.1)

Scientific classification
- Kingdom: Animalia
- Phylum: Chordata
- Class: Reptilia
- Order: Squamata
- Suborder: Iguania
- Family: Dactyloidae
- Genus: Anolis
- Species: A. noblei

Binomial name
- Anolis noblei Barbour & Shreve, 1935

Synonyms
- Anolis equestris noblei Barbour & Shreve, 1935; Deiroptyx noblei (Barbour & Shreve, 1935)

= Anolis noblei =

Species of lizard

Anolis noblei, also known commonly as the Holguin anole, Noble's anole, and the Oriente giant anole, is a species of lizard in the family Dactyloidae. The species is endemic to Cuba. There are two recognized subspecies.

== Etymology ==
The specific name, noblei, is in honor of American herpetologist Gladwyn Kingsley Noble.

== Geographic distribution ==
Anolis noblei is found in eastern Cuba.

== Habitat ==
The preferred natural habitat of Anolis noblei is forest, at elevations from near sea level to 600 m (2,000 ft).

== Reproduction ==
Anolis noblei is oviparous.

== Subspecies ==
The following two subspecies, including the nominotypical subspecies, are recognized as being valid.

- Anolis noblei galeifer Schwartz, 1964
- Anolis noblei noblei Barbour & Shreve, 1935
