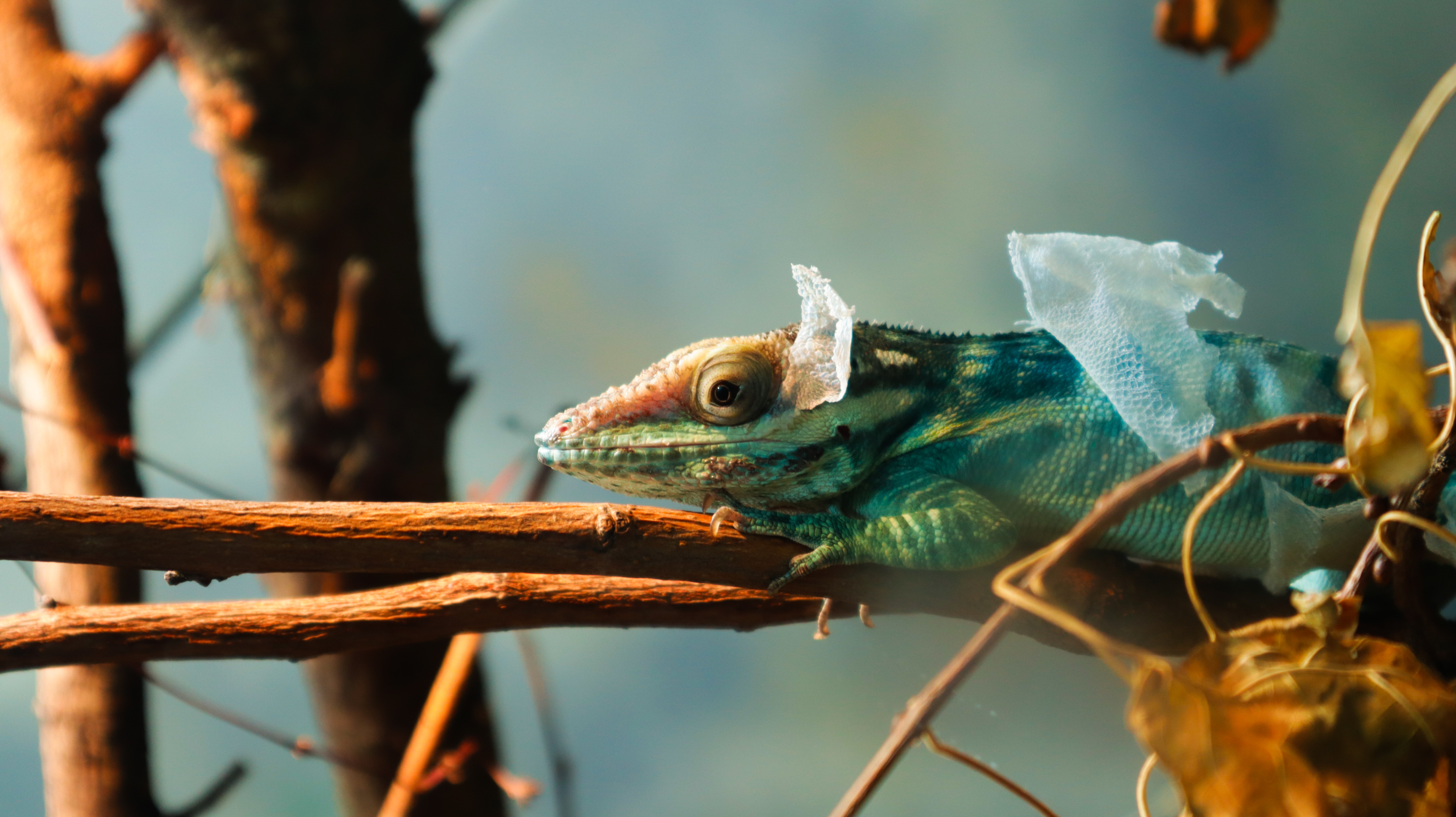

Conservation status
- Near Threatened (IUCN 3.1)

Scientific classification
- Kingdom: Animalia
- Phylum: Chordata
- Class: Reptilia
- Order: Squamata
- Suborder: Iguania
- Family: Anolidae
- Genus: Anolis
- Species: A. smallwoodi

Binomial name
- Anolis smallwoodi Schwartz, 1964

= Anolis smallwoodi =

Species of lizard

Anolis smallwoodi, the green-blotched giant anole or Smallwood's anole, is a species of lizard in the family Dactyloidae. The species is found in Cuba.

Anolis smallwoodi lives in dry forest and coastal scrub habitats in Cuba, where it perches on tree trunks and branches. It belongs to the trunk-crown ecomorph group of Cuban anoles, and recent studies suggest that climate change may alter its range and thermal niche across the island. It is insectivorous but has been reported to take grapes in captivity. Their size snout to vent is typically 3-4 inches.
