= List of tallest buildings designed by women =

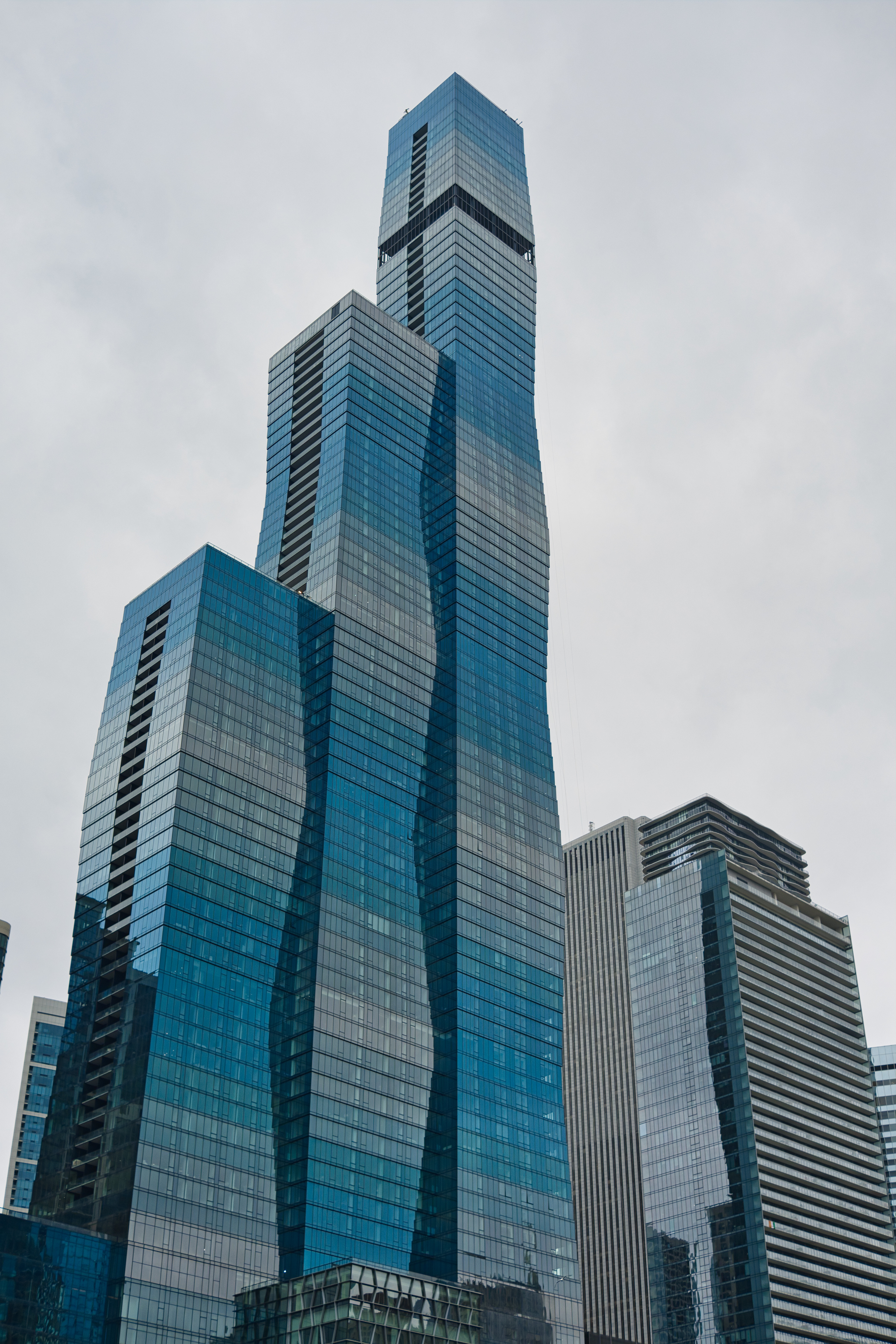
At 363 metres (1,191 ft) tall, Jeanne Gang's St. Regis Chicago is currently the tallest building in the world designed by a woman.

This list ranks skyscrapers by height which were designed by women working as primary architects or design coordinators. Only buildings with continuously occupiable floors are included, thus non-building structures, including towers, are not included. (See List of tallest buildings and structures.)

== Ranking criteria ==
This list includes all occupiable structures over 50-metre (160 ft) tall, including spires, that were designed by women in the roles of primary architect or design coordinator. Note that many of these buildings are designed by larger teams that include the female architects listed.

== Tallest buildings in the world designed by women (50m+) ==
Rank	Building^{[A]}	City	Country	Architect	Height (m)	Height (ft)	Floors	Built
1	St. Regis	Chicago	United States	Jeanne Gang	363 m	1,191 ft	101	2020
2	Aqua	Chicago	United States	Jeanne Gang	262 m	859 ft	87	2009
3	Rainier Square Tower	Seattle	United States	Mindy Levine-Archer	260 m	850 ft	58	2020
4	The Leonardo	Johannesburg	South Africa	Malika Walele, and others	227 m	745 ft	55	2019
5	Tokyu Kabukicho Tower	Tokyo	Japan	Yuko Nagayama	225 m	738 ft	48	2023
6	Trident Grand Residence	Dubai	United Arab Emirates	Hazel Wong	220 m	720 ft	45	2010
7	One Thousand Museum	Miami	United States	Zaha Hadid	216 m	709 ft	62	2019
8	270 Park Avenue	New York City	United States	Natalie de Blois	216 m	708 ft	52	1960
9	Leeza SOHO	Beijing	China	Zaha Hadid	207 m	679 ft	46	2019
10	Wangjing SOHO Tower 1	Beijing	China	Zaha Hadid	200 m	656 ft	44	2014
11	Generali Tower	Milan	Italy	Zaha Hadid	191.5 m	628 ft	44	2017
12	Central Bank of Iraq Tower	Baghdad	Iraq	Zaha Hadid	172 m	564 ft	40	2023
13	Morpheus	Macau	Macau	Zaha Hadid	153 m	504 ft	40	2018
14	Montevideo	Rotterdam	Netherlands	Francine Houben	140 m	458 ft	43	2005
15	Equitable Building	Chicago	United States	Natalie de Blois	139 m	457 ft	35	1965
16	The Emerald	Seattle	United States	Julia Nagele	133.7 m	439 ft	40	2020
17	MIRA	San Francisco	United States	Jeanne Gang	129 m	422 ft	29	2021
18	Wangjing SOHO Tower 2	Beijing	China	Zaha Hadid	127 m	417 ft	26	2014
19	Vertical Courtyard Apartment 1	Hangzhou	China	Lu Wenyu	126 m	414 ft	31	2006
20	Vertical Courtyard Apartment 2	Hangzhou	China	Lu Wenyu	126 m	414 ft	31	2006
21	Vertical Courtyard Apartment 4	Hangzhou	China	Lu Wenyu	126 m	414 ft	31	2006
22	Vertical Courtyard Apartment 5	Hangzhou	China	Lu Wenyu	126 m	414 ft	31	2006
23	Vertical Courtyard Apartment 5	Hangzhou	China	Lu Wenyu	126 m	414 ft	31	2006
24	Vertical Courtyard Apartment 6	Hangzhou	China	Lu Wenyu	118 m	387 ft	29	2006
25	Wangjing SOHO Tower 3	Beijing	China	Zaha Hadid	118 m	387 ft	25	2014
26	One Hundred	St. Louis	United States	Jeanne Gang	117 m	385 ft	36	2021
27	Kilbourn Tower	Milwaukee	United States	Grace La	115 m	380 ft	33	2005
28	Sky Park I	Bratislava	Slovakia	Zaha Hadid	105 m	344 ft	31	2021
29	Sky Park II	Bratislava	Slovakia	Zaha Hadid	105 m	344 ft	31	2021
30	Sky Park III	Bratislava	Slovakia	Zaha Hadid	105 m	344 ft	31	2021
31	Sky Park VI	Bratislava	Slovakia	Zaha Hadid	105 m	344 ft	31	2023
32	Kölntriangle	Cologne	Germany	Dörte Gatermann	103 m	339 ft	29	2005
33	Skyglass	Seattle	United States	Julia Nagele	102 m	335 ft	32	2023
34	Lever House	New York City	United States	Natalie de Blois	94 m	307 ft	21	1952
35	The Opus	Dubai	United Arab Emirates	Zaha Hadid	93 m	305 ft	21	2018
36	Solstice on the Park	Chicago	United States	Jeanne Gang, Gabrielle Poirier, Margaret Cavenagh	91 m	299 ft	27	2018
37	FiftyTwoDegrees	Nijmegen	Netherlands	Francine Houben	86 m	282 ft	20	2008
38	Crowne Plaza Cincinnati	Cincinnati	United States	Natalie de Blois	83 m	272 ft	19	1949
39	Jockey Club Innovation Tower	Hong Kong	Hong Kong	Zaha Hadid	76 m	249 ft	15	2013
40	Q Residences	Amsterdam	Netherlands	Jeanne Gang	77 m	246 ft	24	2022
41	Heydar Aliyev Center	Baku	Azerbaijan	Zaha Hadid	74 m	243 ft		2013
42	Atlantis Condominium	Miami	United States	Elizabeth Plater-Zyberk	69 m	227 ft	20	1982
43	888 Bellevue	Bellevue	United States	Julia Nagele	66 m	215 ft	20	2020
44	Library of Birmingham	Birmingham	United Kingdom	Francine Houben	60 m	200 ft	20	2013
45	40 Tenth Avenue	New York City	United States	Jeanne Gang	53 m	190 ft	12	2018
46	Paras Trinity	Gurgaon	India	Sonali Rastogi	53 m	174 ft	14	2015

== Gallery ==
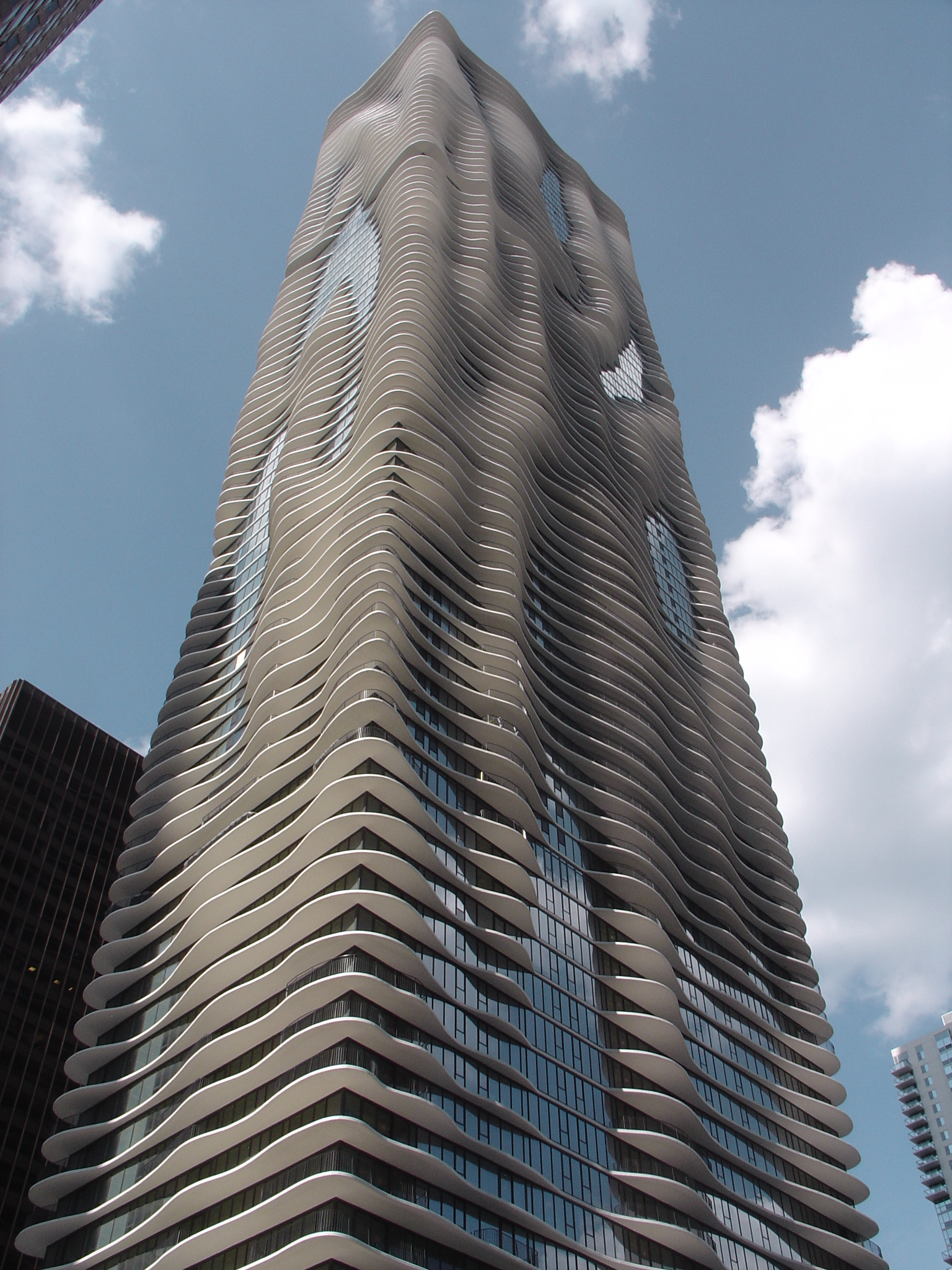
Aqua in Chicago was once the world's tallest female-designed building, now beaten by St. Regis Chicago, designed by the same architect, Jeanne Gang.

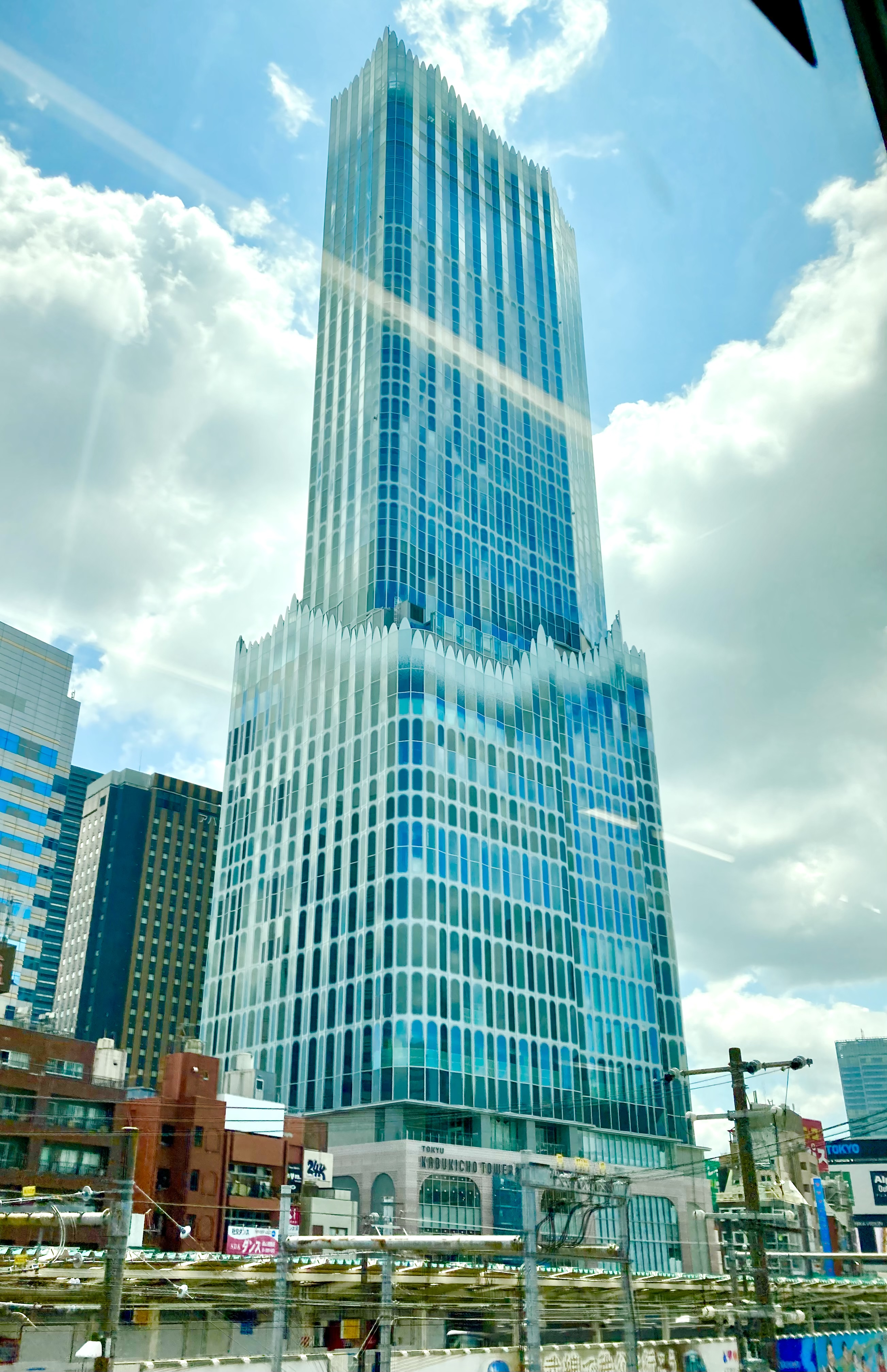
Tokyu Kabukicho Tower in Tokyo was the 1st skyscraper designed by a woman in Japan.

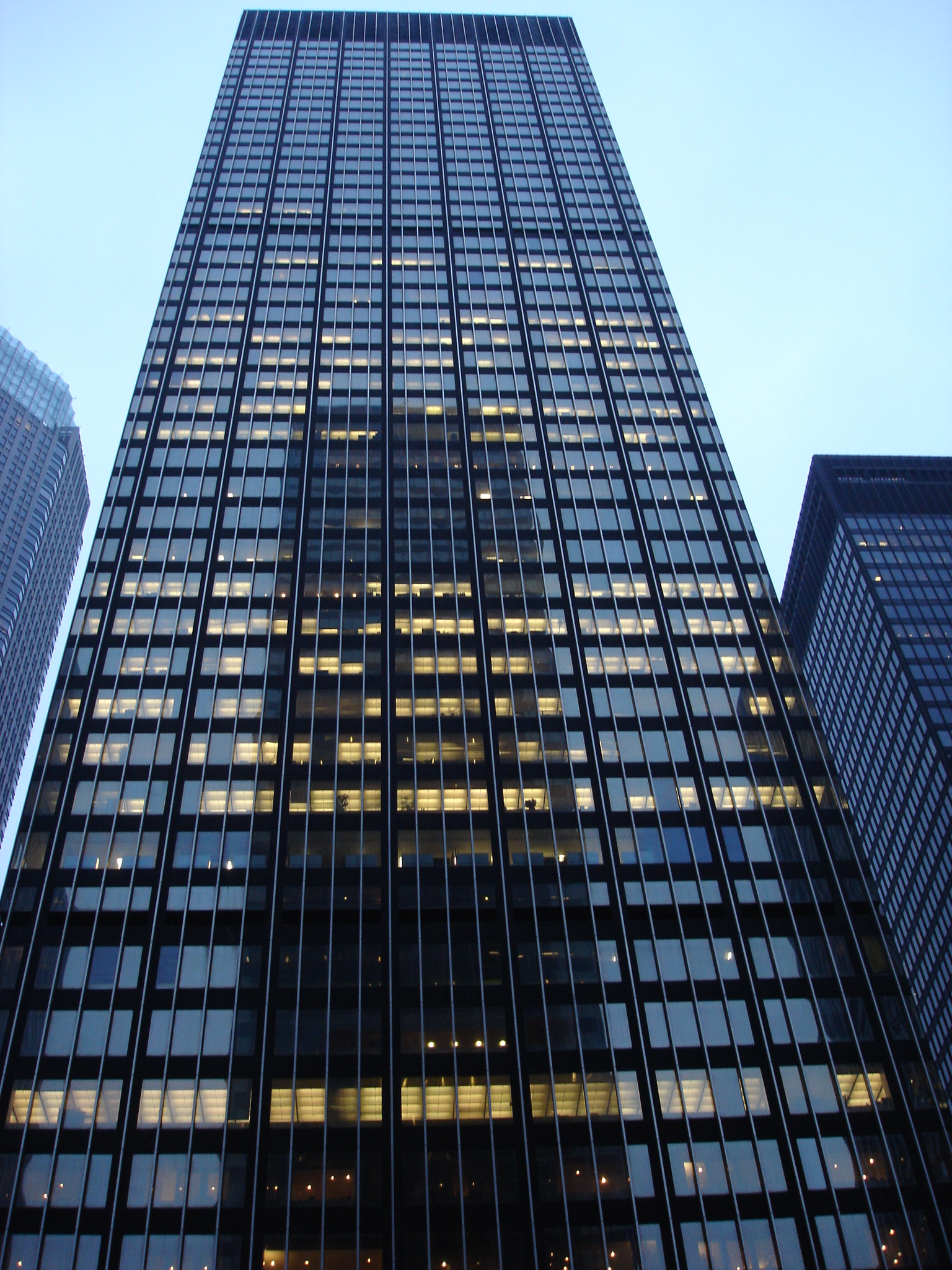
270 Park Avenue in New York City is the 3rd tallest female-designed building. It is slated to be demolished in 2018 and be replaced by a larger structure.

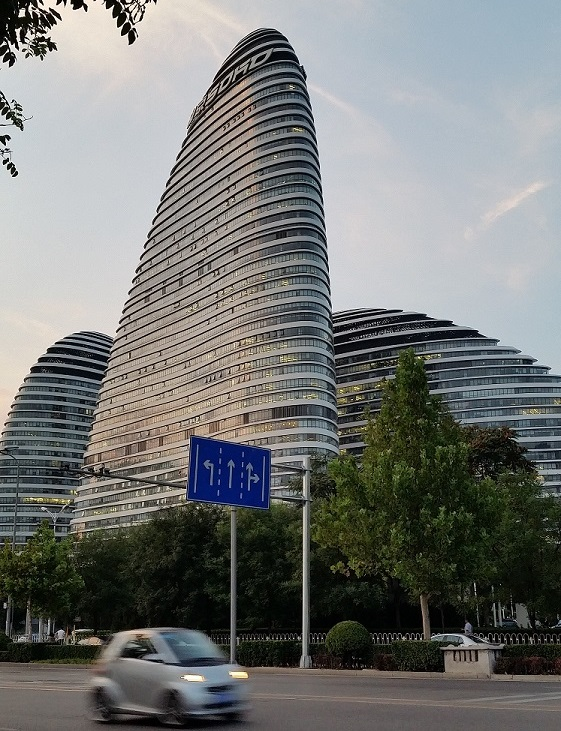
Wangjing SOHO in Beijing is a complex designed by Zaha Hadid that includes the world's 4th, 7th, and 8th tallest female-designed towers.

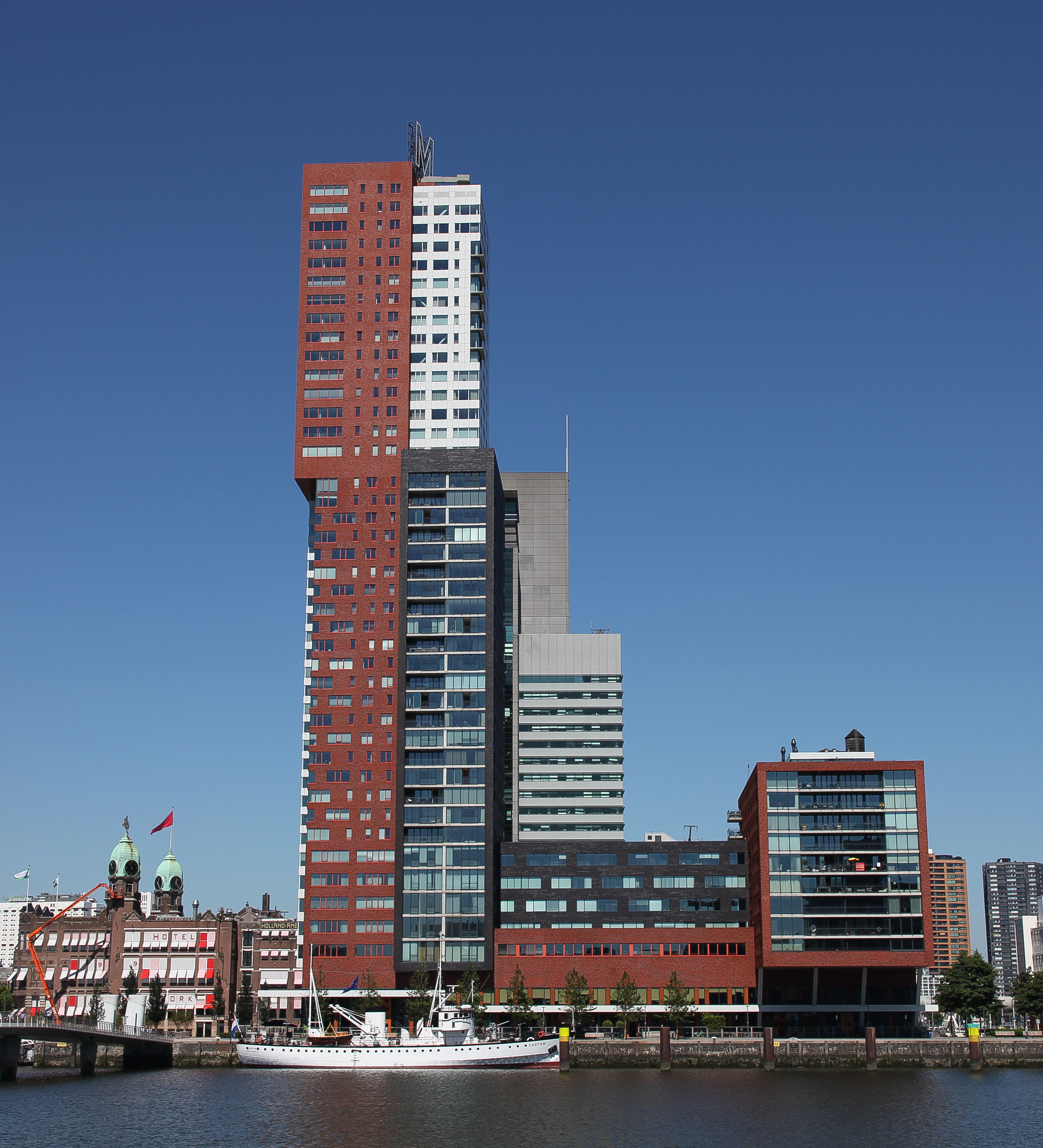
Montevideo in Rotterdam is the 5th tallest female-designed building in the world.

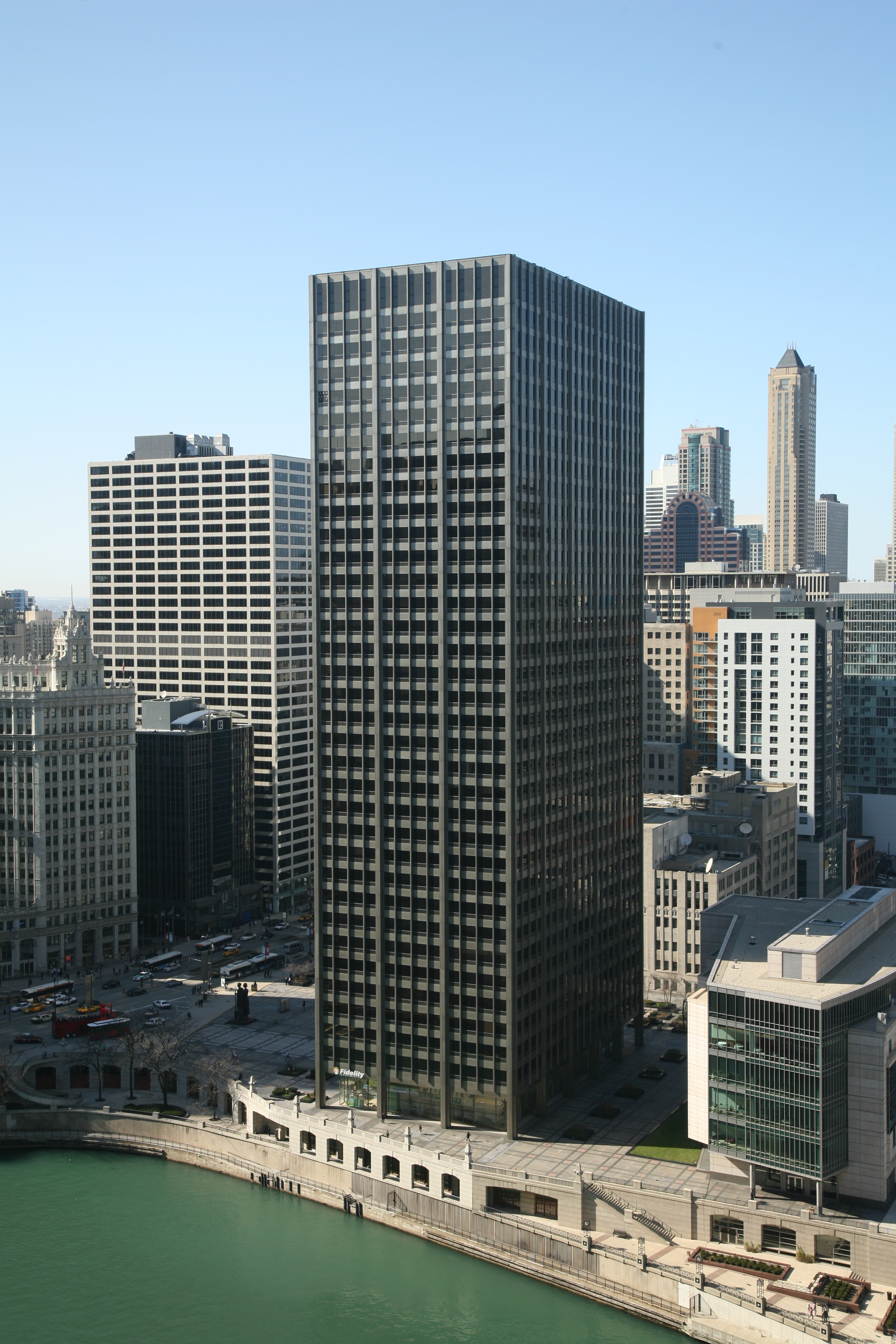
The Equitable Building in Chicago is the 7th tallest female-designed building in the world.

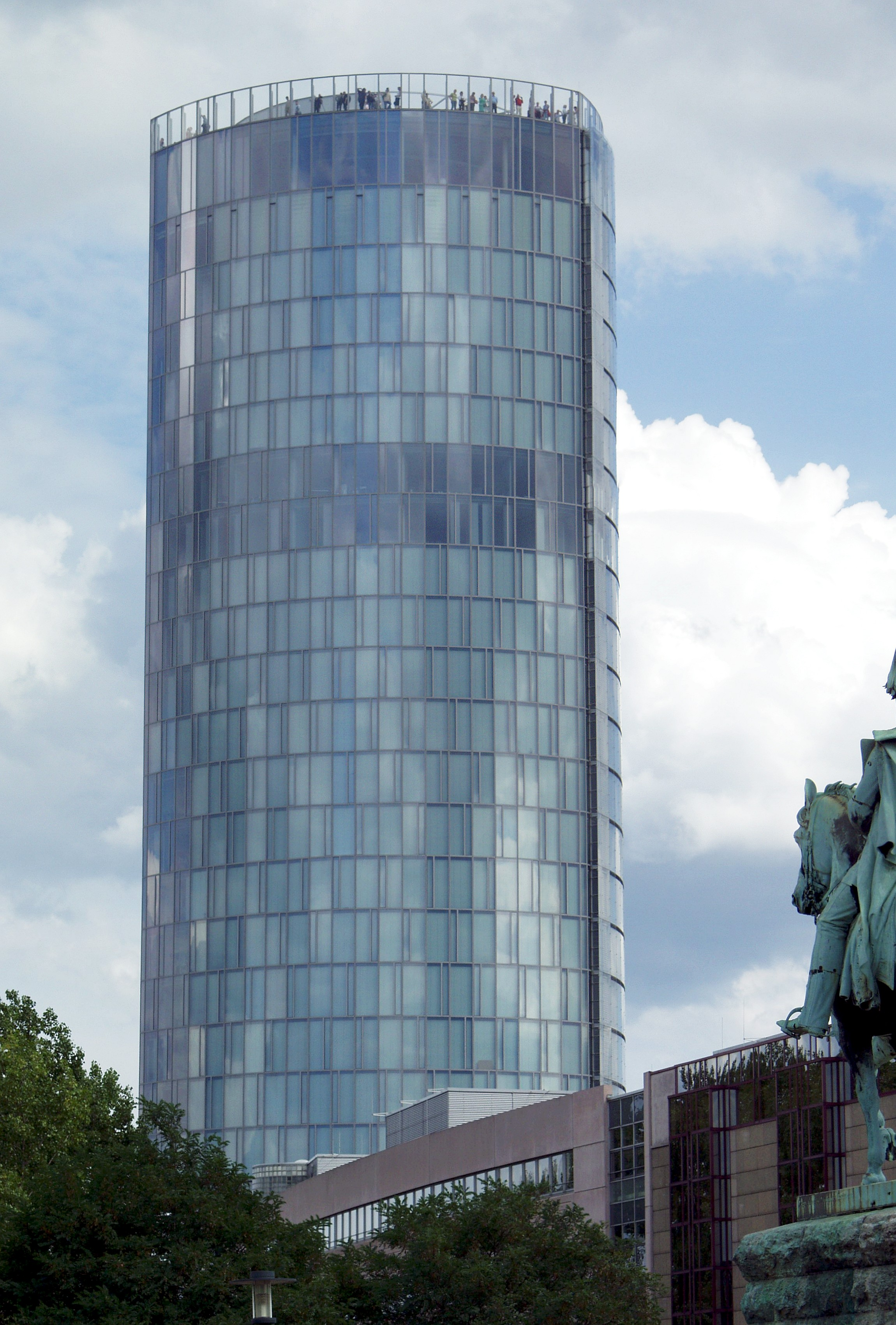
The Cologne Triangle in Cologne is the 16th tallest female-designed building in the world.

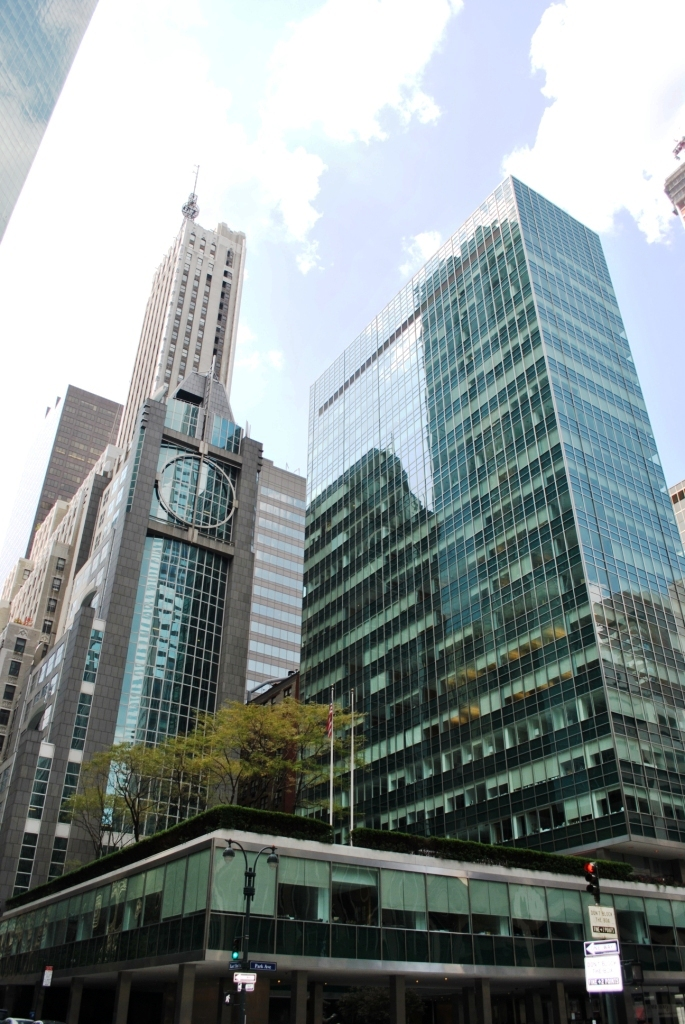
The Lever House in New York City is the 17th tallest female-designed building in the world.

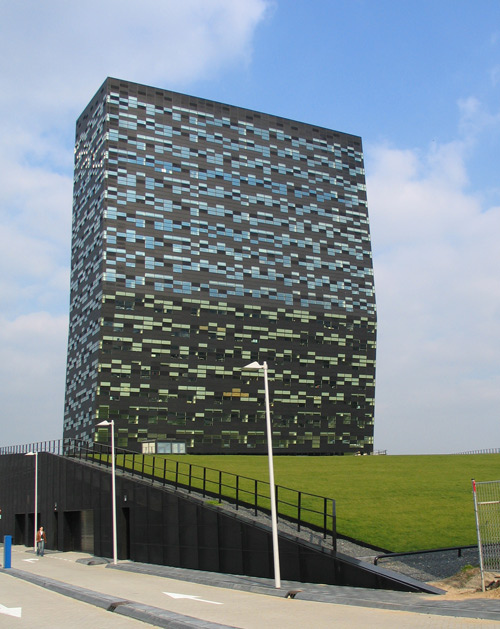
FiftyTwoDegrees in Nijmegen is the 18th tallest female-designed building in the world.

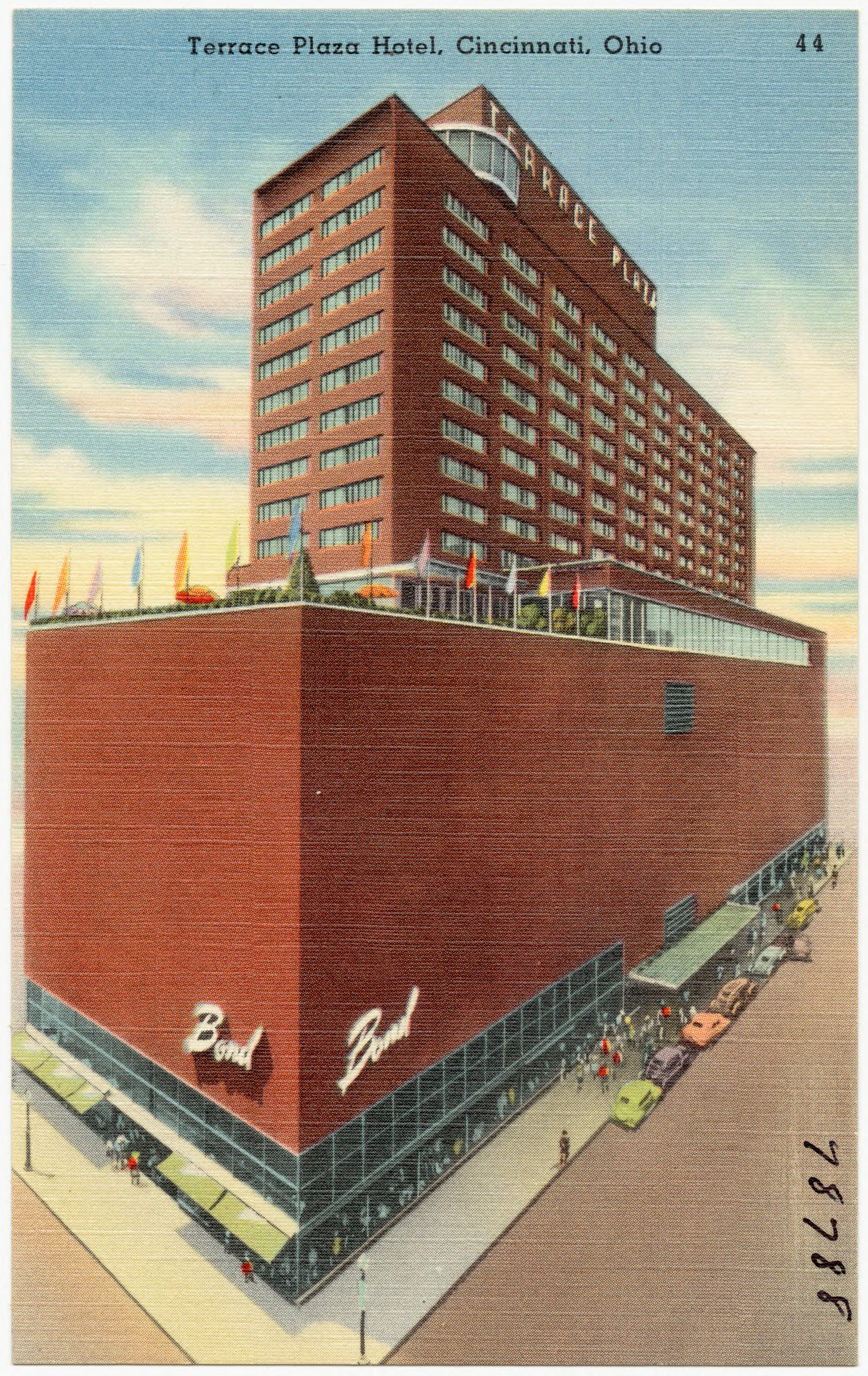
Terrace Plaza Hotel, now known as Crowne Plaza Cincinnati, is the 19th tallest female-designed building in the world.

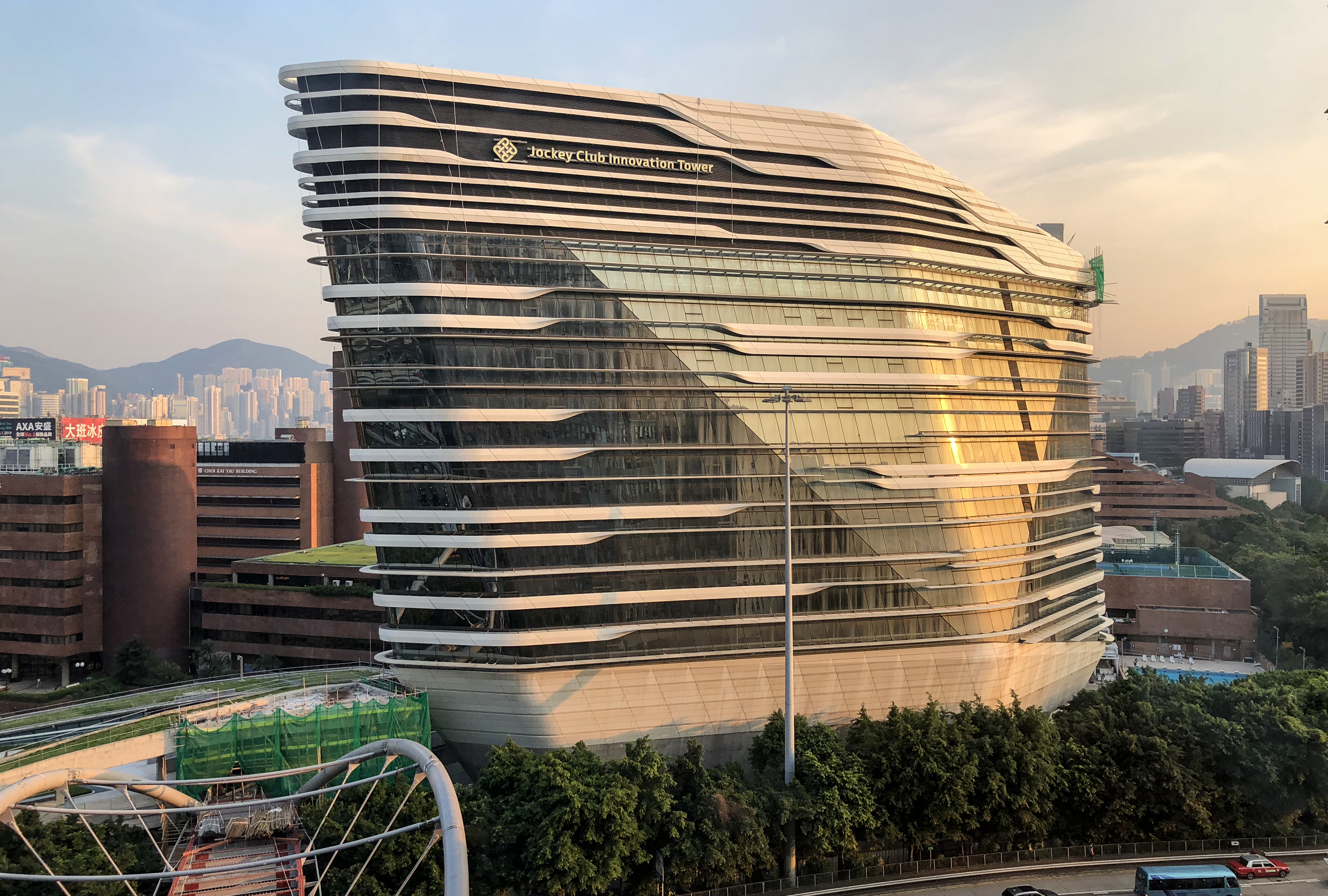
Jockey Club Innovation Tower in Hong Kong is the 20th tallest female-designed building in the world.

Heydar Aliyev Center in Baku is the 21st tallest female-designed building in the world.

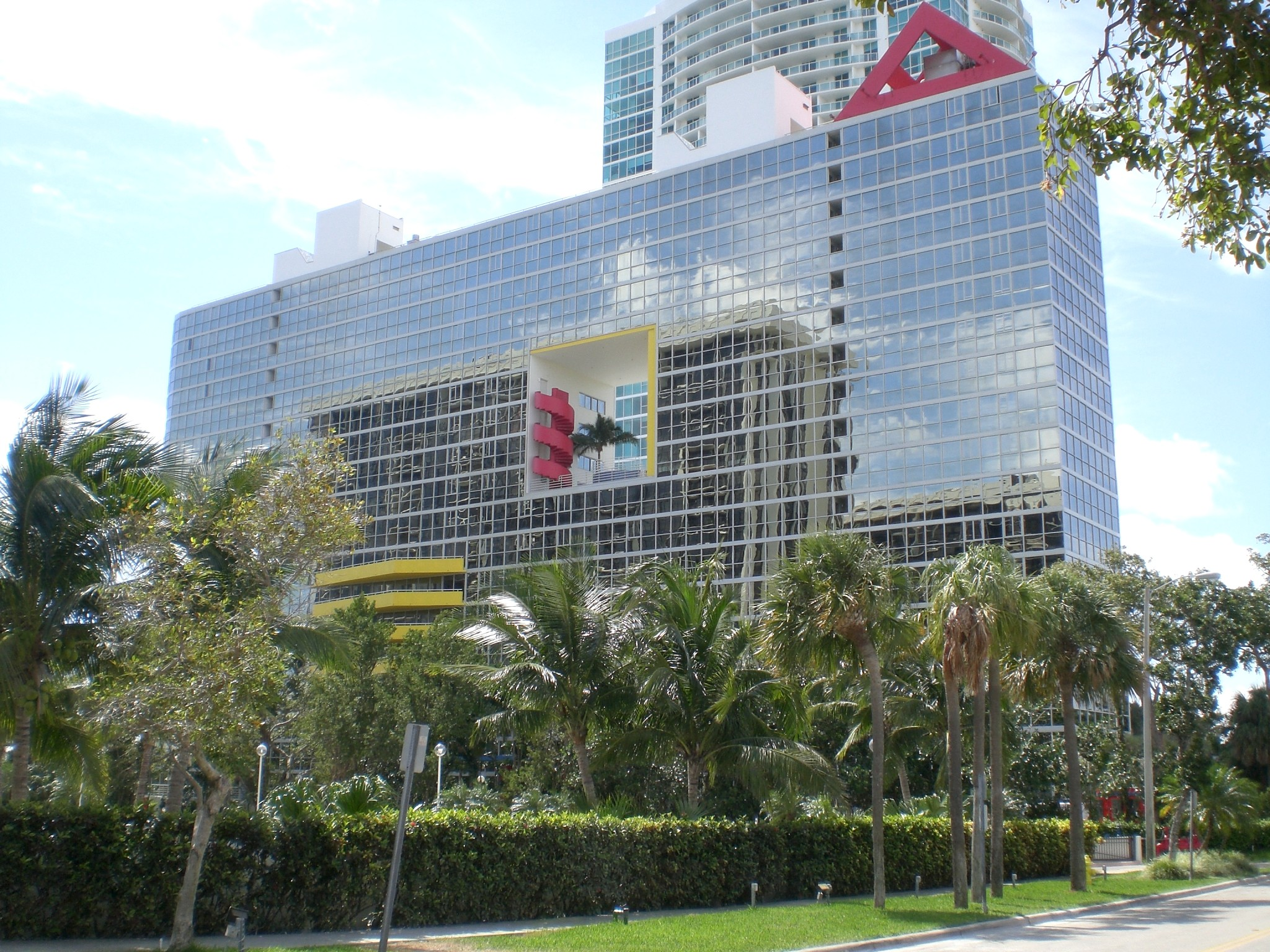
Atlantis Condominium in Miami is the 22nd tallest female-designed building in the world.

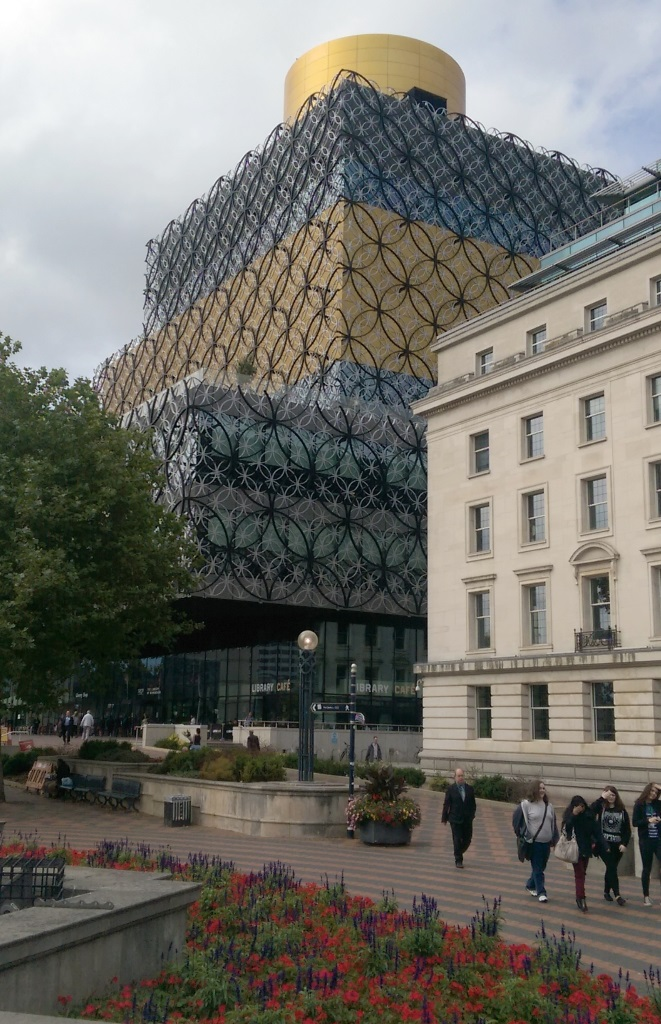
The Library of Birmingham in England is the 23rd tallest female-designed building in the world.

The Trident Grand Residence in Dubai is the 5th tallest female-designed building in the world.

== Buildings under construction ==
This is a list of buildings taller than 50 meters designed by women that are currently under construction.

Building	City	Country	Architect	Planned architectural height	Floors	Planned completion	Ref.
Fereshteh Pasargad Hotel	Tehran	Iran	Zaha Hadid	230 m (750 ft)	46	2024	
Central Bank of Iraq Tower	Baghdad	Iraq	Zaha Hadid	172 m (564 ft)	40	2023	
One Delisle	Toronto	Canada	Jeanne Gang	158 m (518 ft)	48	2026	
Mercury Tower	St. Julian's	Malta	Zaha Hadid	122 m (400 ft)	32	2023	
Sky Park Tower	Bratislava	Slovakia	Zaha Hadid	119 m (390 ft)	33	2027	
Skyglass	Seattle	United States	Julia Nagele	102.1 m (335 ft)	32	2023	

== See also ==
- History of the world's tallest buildings
- Women in architecture
- List of women architects
- List of tallest buildings by height to roof
- List of architects of supertall buildings
- List of cities with the most skyscrapers
- List of future tallest buildings
- List of tallest buildings and structures
- List of largest buildings
- List of tallest hotels
- List of tallest residential buildings
- List of tallest structures
- Skyscraper Index
