= Trident Grand Residence =

High-rise tower in Dubai, United Arab Emirates

- The Trident Grand Residence in November 2023
- Interactive map of the Trident Grand Residence area

General information
- Type: Residential
- Classification: High-rise
- Location: Dubai, United Arab Emirates
- Coordinates: 25.083179°N 55.140966°E
- Construction started: 2006
- Completed: 2010
- Cost: AECOM

Height
- Height: 220 m

Technical details
- Material: All-Concrete
- Floor count: 45

Design and construction
- Architect: Hazel Wong
- Developer: Trident International Holdings
- Main contractor: Trident International Holdings

Other information
- Number of units: 212

Website
- http://tridentgrandresidence.com

The Trident Grand Residence is a 45-floor high-rise tower in the Dubai Marina in Dubai, United Arab Emirates. The building has a height of 220 meters (721.78 feet) and has 212 apartment units. Construction of the Trident Grand Residence was started in 2006 and was completed in 2010.

== Features ==
There are 1, 2, and 3-bedroom apartment types in the Trident Grand Residence as well as 4-bedroom penthouses. The tower has covered parking and 3 high-speed elevators. The tower also has a gym, spa, swimming pool, event space, kids' play area, and a games room.

The Trident Grand Residence was designed by Hazel Wong (architect of the Emirates Towers) and developed by Trident International Holdings. It is the 105th tallest building in Dubai and the 6th tallest building designed by a woman in the world.

== See also ==
- List of tallest buildings in Dubai
