= Julia Nagele =

- Education: Lehigh University; University of Maryland
- Occupations: Senior Principal and Director of Design - Architecture
- Website: HEWITT

Julia Nagele (born Dec. 4, 1971) is a designer and educator. She serves as the director of design and a senior principal at HEWITT, a Seattle-based architecture firm. Known for her work designing skyscrapers, three of Nagele's recent towers (Emerald, Skyglass, 888 Bellevue) can be found on the list of tallest buildings designed by women.

== Biography ==
Nagele graduated Cum Laude with a Bachelor of Architecture degree from Lehigh University in Bethlehem, Penn., in 1994. She completed her Master of Architecture degree from the University of Maryland in 1996, and was awarded the Dean's Thesis Prize. She started her career with Ayers/Saint/Gross Architects in Pennsylvania before moving to Seattle. Nagele spent time at LMN Architects and owned her own business prior to joining HEWITT in 2011. Nagele was named a HEWITT principal and the director of design – architecture in 2018, and senior principal in 2022.

Nagele's The Emerald tower, one of the tallest residential buildings on the west coast designed by a woman, was called "city's most highly-anticipated luxury condominium" by Dwell magazine. Her "striking" 32-story Skyglass topped off in 2023. Projects slated to break ground in 2024 include: 29-story 1107, which the design review board said has "icon potential" and Mama Tower, which will reach 484 feet, Nagele's 27-story OneU, currently in design, features two distinctive cut-out social greenway terraces.

Many of Nagele's projects feature complex urban conditions, where she "relishes creating spaces for unplanned connections, allowing people and ideas to cross paths". Nagele is a frequent industry speaker, panelist and committee member. In 2021, she was recognized by Seattle Met as one of Seattle's most influential people, and in 2022, Nagele delivered the MAPP commencement address at the University of Maryland.

== Notable projects ==
- The Emerald (122 Stewart Street), Seattle
- Skyglass (222 Dexter), Seattle
- 1107 (1107 NE 45th Street), Seattle
- OneU (1013 NE 45th Street), Seattle
- Mama Tower (1516 2nd Avenue), Seattle
- Capitol Hill Station Transit-Oriented Development, Seattle
- Gridiron (590 1st Ave S), Seattle
- 888 Bellevue, (888 108th Ave NE) Bellevue, Washington
- Excelsior (1535 Bellevue Ave), Seattle
- The Luna (2749 California Ave SW), Seattle
- The LeeAnn Apartments (701 5th Ave North), Seattle
- Verve (2720 4th Ave), Seattle
