= PolyU School of Design =

Design school of the Hong Kong Polytechnic University

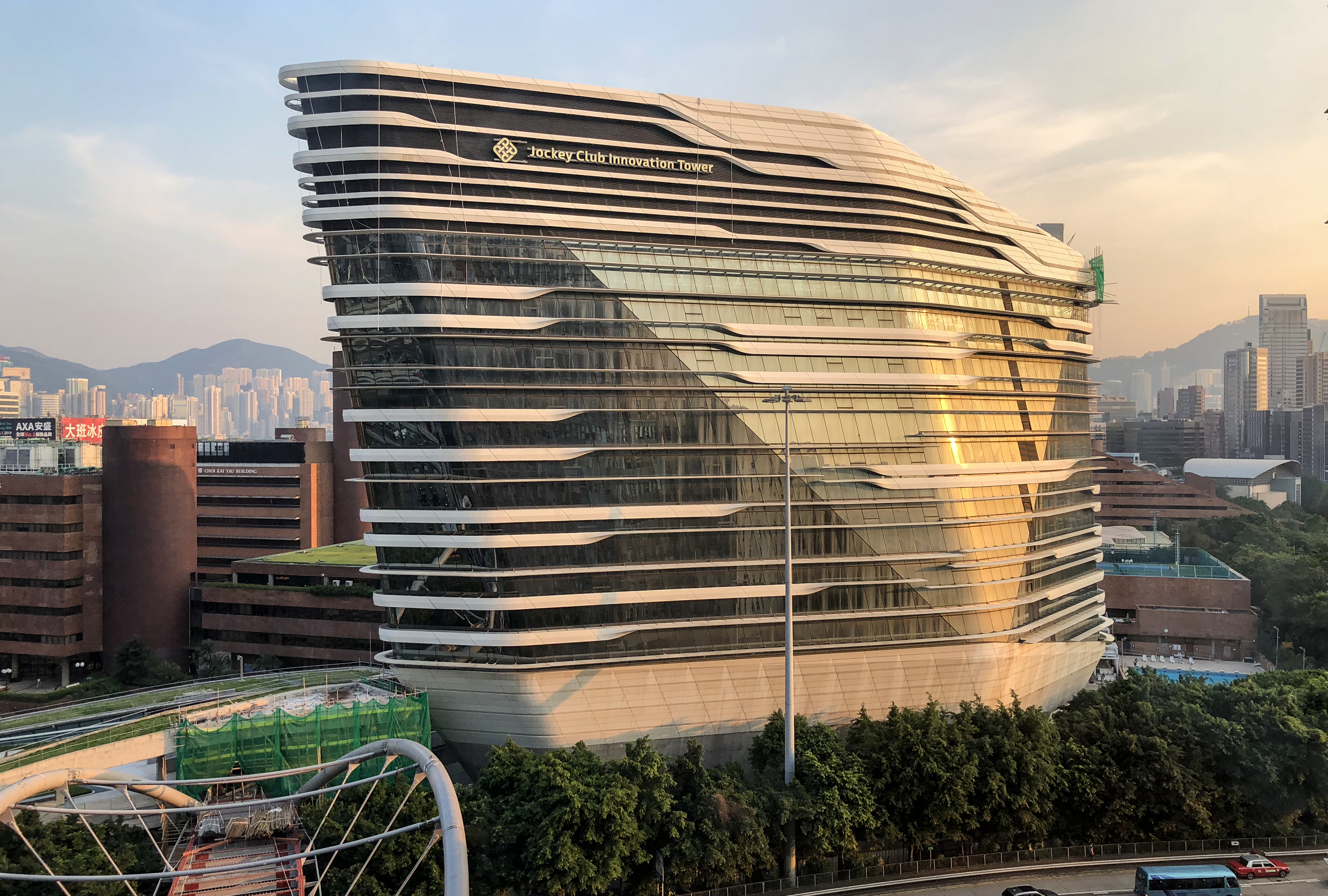
- Jockey Club Innovation Tower, the main campus of the school.
- Motto: Make possibilities endless
- Type: Public
- Established: 1964
- Parent institution: The Hong Kong Polytechnic University
- Dean: Kun-Pyo Lee (2018-Present) Cees de Bont (2012-2018) Lorraine Justice (2004-2011)
- Address: Jockey Club Innovation Tower, Hung Hom, Hong Kong
- Website: Official website

The PolyU School of Design (also known as PolyU Design) is one of the ten schools and faculties of The Hong Kong Polytechnic University. The school was established in 1964 as a department in the Hong Kong Technical College. As of 2020, PolyU Design ranks 2nd in Asia and 15th in the world for art and design in QS World Rankings.

== History ==
First established in 1964 in the Hong Kong Technical College, general certificate courses were offered. In 1972, when the Hong Kong Polytechnic was formally established, it was renamed as the Department of Design, offering higher diploma courses. In 1980s, the department became the Swire School of Design, the school offered bachelor degrees. In 1994, when the polytechnic was granted university status, it became the PolyU School of Design, launching master degrees.

In 2013, the School of Design introduced the campus of the school, Jockey Club Innovation Tower, designed by Zaha Hadid.

== Notable alumni ==
- Raman Hui
- Kit Hung
- Gigi Leung
- Henry Lau
- Tony Leung
- Alice Mak
- Vivienne Tam
- Paul Wong
- Timmy Yip
- Kitty Yuen

== See also ==
- Hong Kong Polytechnic University
- Hong Kong Design Institute
- Savannah College of Art and Design, Hong Kong
