= Trade Centre 2 =

Trade Centre 2 المركز التجاري الثاني
- Community
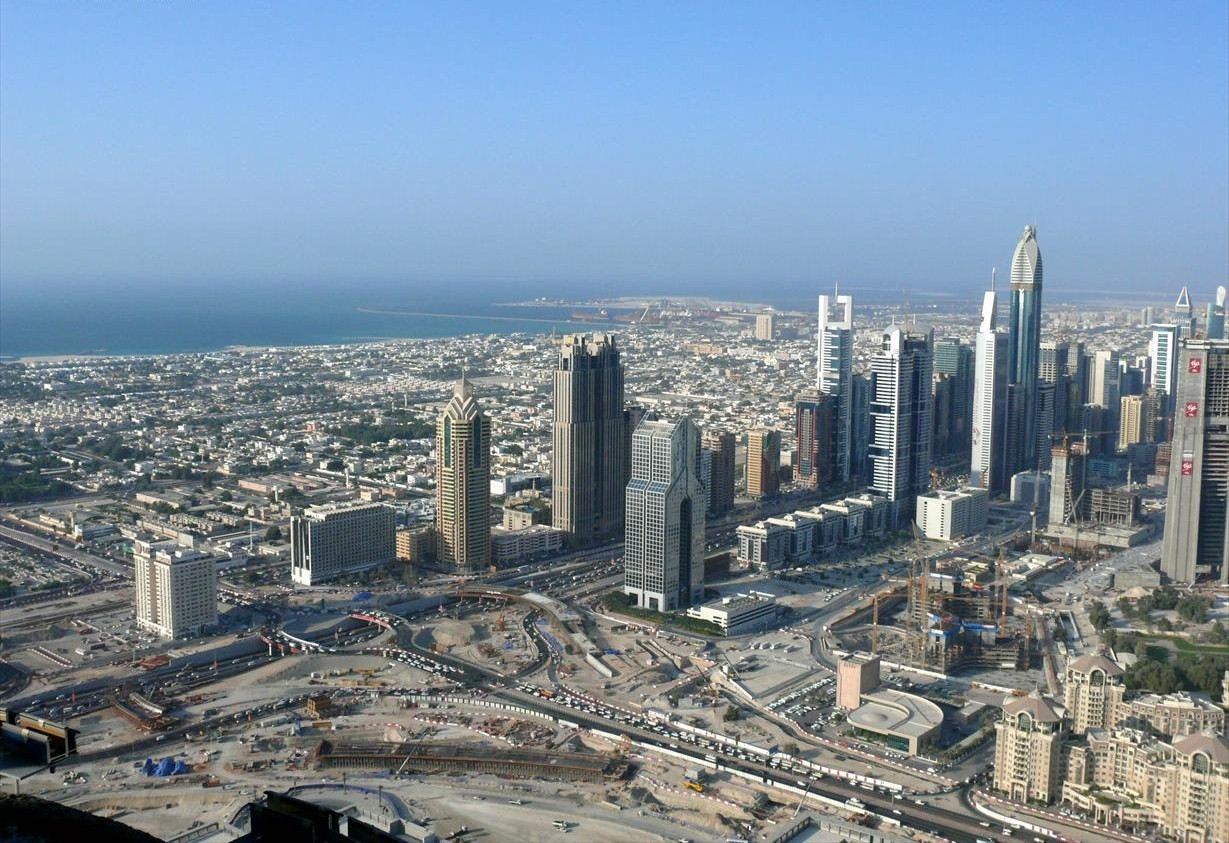
- Trade Centre 2 (middle - bottom-right) near Defence Roundabout.

- Location within Dubai
- Coordinates: 25.22047°N 55.28552°E
- Country: United Arab Emirates
- Emirate: Dubai
- City: Dubai

Area
  - Total: 1.91 km^{2} (0.74 sq mi)

Population (2000)
  - Total: 3,353
  - Density: 1,760/km^{2} (4,550/sq mi)
- Community number: 336

Trade Centre 2 (Arabic: المركز التجاري الثاني), also known as Dubai Financial Centre, is a locality in Dubai, United Arab Emirates.

== Geography ==
Trade Centre 2 is located in the western Dubai, along Sheikh Zayed Road. It borders Trade Centre 1 to the north, Business Bay to the south, and Zabeel to the east. Trade Centre 2 begins at Trade Centre Roundabout (Interchange No. 1), at the intersection of Sheikh Zayed Road and route D 63 (Al Dhiyafa Road) and terminates at Interchange No. 2 (Defence Roundabout). Like Trade Centre 1, Trade Centre 2 does not have a local road system. It is bounded to the east by 310th Road and to the south by route D 71 (Al Doha Street).

Trade Centre 2 consists of commercial and residential skyscrapers along Sheikh Zayed Road. Important landmarks in Trade Centre 2 include Dubai World Trade Centre, Emirates Towers, Rose Tower, 21st Century Tower, Angsana Hotel & Suites, Al Yaqoub Tower, Dusit Dubai and Falcon Tower.
