= Central Bank of Iraq Tower =

Skyscraper in Iraq

- برج البنك المركزي العراقي
- The Central Bank of Iraq Tower under construction in 2024
- Interactive map of the Central Bank of Iraq Tower area

General information
- Status: Completed
- Type: Office
- Architectural style: Deconstructivism, futurist architecture
- Location: Al-Jadiriya, Baghdad, Baghdad, Iraq
- Coordinates: 33°17′20.3″N 44°23′4.2″E
- Construction started: 2018
- Estimated completion: 2026
- Cost: $772 million
- Owner: Central Bank of Iraq (CBI)

Height
- Height: 172 m (564 ft)

Technical details
- Floor count: 38
- Floor area: 93,552 m^{2} (1,006,985 sq ft)

Design and construction
- Architect: Zaha Hadid
- Main contractor: Daax construction

Website
- www.zaha-hadid.com/architecture/central-bank-of-iraq/

The Central Bank of Iraq Tower (Arabic: برج البنك المركزي العراقي), also known as the Zaha Hadid Tower, is a 37-story office skyscraper under construction located on the banks of the Tigris river in the Al-Jadiriya district of Baghdad, Iraq. Upon completion, it will be the second tallest building in the country after E1 Tower in Erbil and the tallest building in Baghdad with a height of 172 m (564 ft).

The Central Bank of Iraq (CBI) had commissioned the Iraqi-British architect Zaha Hadid in 2010 to design the project, and was presented in 2011, however construction on the project only began in late 2018. It is scheduled to be completed in 2026.

The tower will serve as the new headquarters for the Central Bank of Iraq, Iraq's national bank. It also features a VIP entrance, visitor entrance, main lobby, museums, personnel entrance, energy centre, public area, personnel facility, cash management area, data centre, security centre and landscaping areas.

== History ==
In August 2010, Iraqi-British architect Zaha Hadid, was appointed to design a new headquarters for the Central Bank in Baghdad. Initial talks about the project were held in Istanbul, Turkey, on 14 August 2010, in the presence of the bank governor Sinan al-Shabibi. On 2 February 2012, Hadid joined Sinan Al Shabibi at a ceremony in London to sign the agreement between the bank and her firm for the design stages of the new building. The construction was postponed in 2015 due to economical problems, but started again in 2019.

== Design ==
The structural exoskeleton frames the facade, which is itself composed of alternating patterns of open and closed elements that visually and conceptually mimic the light reflection from waves in the river below, reinforcing the dynamism of the design and serving the practical purpose of providing a variety of areas of light and shade within. Solid at its base, the exoskeleton gradually opens and reduces the tower rises skywards, bringing greater lightness and views across the capital, Baghdad. The bank's podium weaves hard and soft landscaping together and anchors the building within its context, gradually adjusting its scale through a series of landscaped terraces and gardens to directly engage with the surrounding neighbourhood and manage access to the bank. The vertical layers of the tower's exoskeleton are transformed into the horizontal podium and subtly re-emerge within the landscape.

== Gallery ==
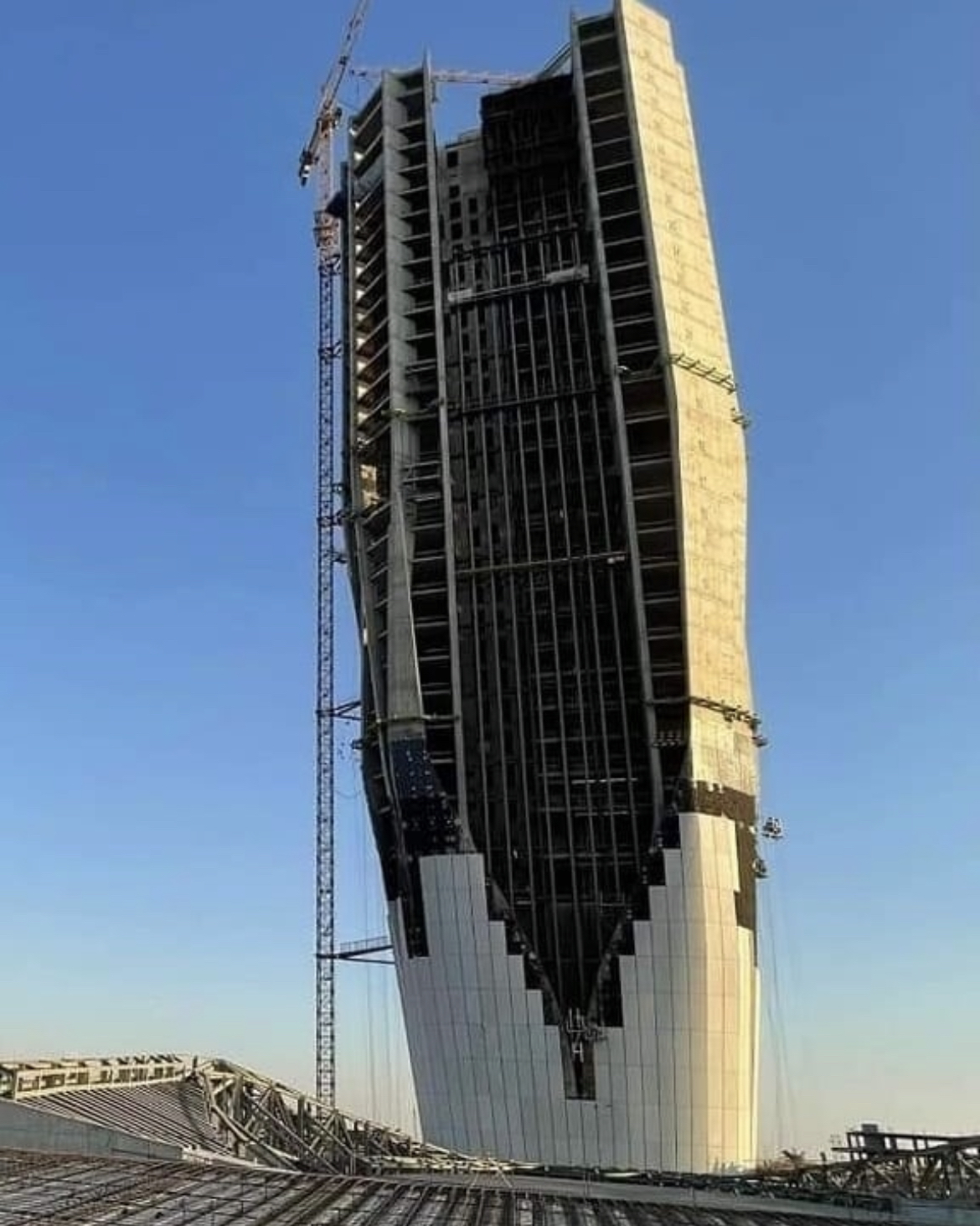

== Sources ==
Media related to Central Bank of Iraq Tower at Wikimedia Commons
