= Dörte Gatermann =

German architect (born 1956)

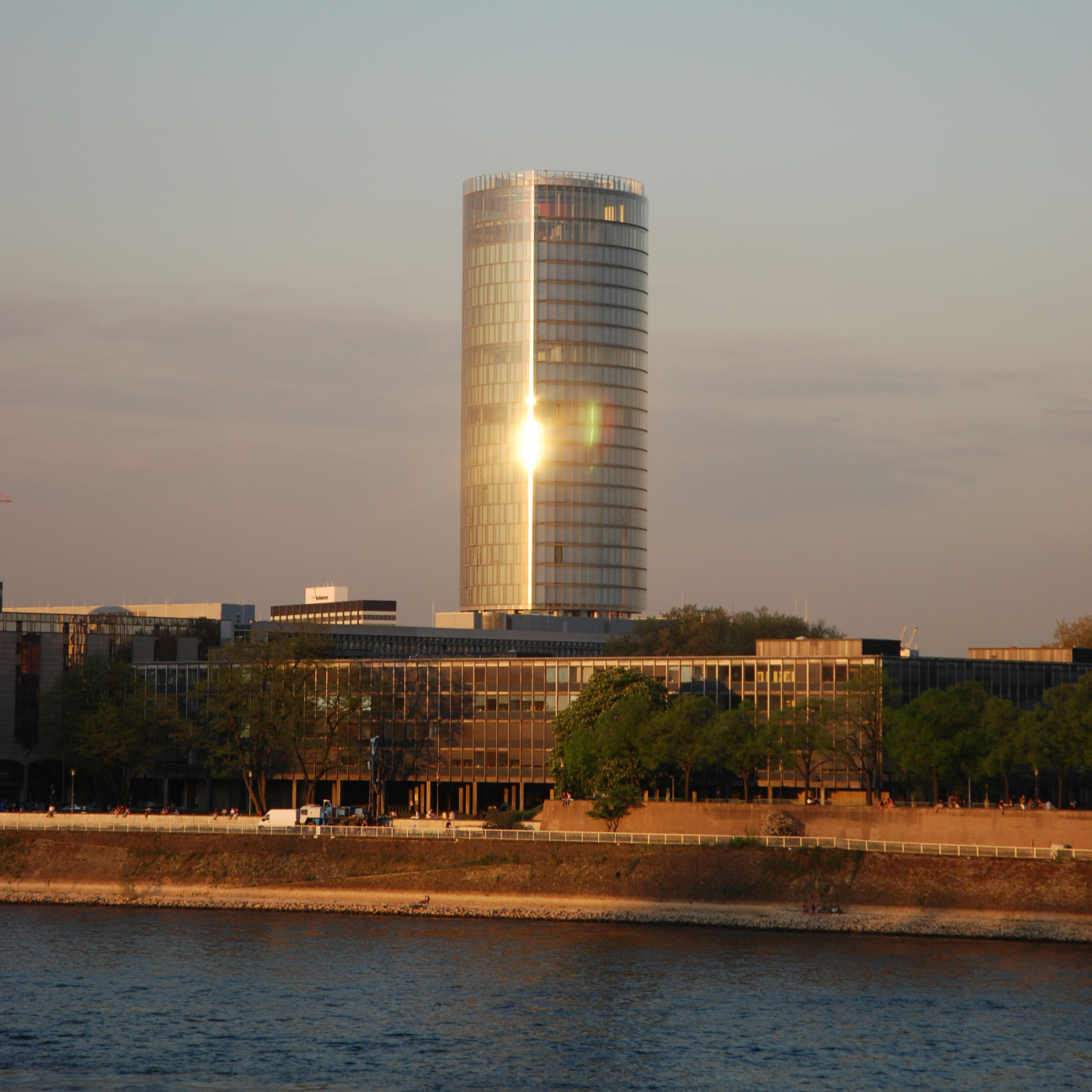
The Cologne Triangle Tower designed by Dörte Gatermann

Dörte Gatermann (born 1956, Hamburg) is a German architect who is best known for designing the Triangle Tower in Cologne.

== Early life ==
Dörte Gatermann's was born in 1956 in Hamburg, Germany. Gatermann's mother died when she was a little girl, and she was raised by her architect father. She went on to study at the Braunschweig University of Technology and at RWTH Aachen where she studied under Pritzker prize-winning architect Gottfried Böhm. After working successfully as leader for Böhm's Züblin House project in Stuttgart while still a student, she spent the next five years working for him as project leader after her graduation.

== Career ==
In 1984, together with her partner Elmar Schossig, whom she later married, Gatermann opened her own architecture firm in Cologne, Gatermann + Schossig. After a few rather modest assignments, larger commissions materialized making the company one of the most innovative and successful architectural firms in Germany. By 2009, when Schossig died, they had implemented some 50 projects. In 2002, after being offered various professorships, Gatermann finally took the chair at the Technische Universität Darmstadt where she taught until 2007, ultimately deciding to concentrate on her business in Cologne. One of her most memorable achievements in Darmstadt was arranging the so-called "Hall of Fame" museum for women, including the travelling exhibition she designed for the photographer Bettina Flitner.

Gatermann's masterpiece is the Triangle Tower, with a height of approximately 103 meters. Awarded the commission when she was only 47 years old, she now states with an air of self-satisfaction: "I have shown that not only men can build skyscrapers but that I can too." In 2006, the Gatermann + Schossig architectural firm was awarded the Pilkington glass company "Synthesis - Architect and Industry" prize for innovation in architecture as a result of their innovative use of glass in the Triangle building.

Other projects Gatermann has been involved with include the Bayenturm, a 13th-century tower in the centre of Cologne which she repaired, renovated and extended in the 1990s, her own home completed in 2000 (one of the very few buildings on which she cooperated closely with her husband) and the recently opened exhibition space she designed for the Roman Museum at the Xanten Archeology Park.

== Notable Projects ==
- Haus Neufert Cologne
- KölnTriangle
- LVR-Archaeological Park Xanten
- State Office of Criminal Investigation of North-Rhine Westfalia
- Capricornhaus Düsseldorf
- North-Rhine Westfalia Ministry of school and education
- Bayenturm
- Kontor 19 Rheinauhafen Cologne
- Harbour office at Rheinauhafen Cologne
- Bureau office Baufeld 10
- municipal utilities Bochum
- Postbank office Cologne
- Rimowa factory
- Haus P
- Haus G+S
- Micropolis Dresden
- pump station Niehl

== Sources ==
- Flitner, Bettina: Frauen mit Visionen – 48 Europäerinnen (Women with visions – 48 Europeans). With texts by Alice Schwarzer. Munich: Knesebeck, 2004. ISBN 3-89660-211-X, 84–87 p.
