= Kölntriangle =

103.2 metres (339 ft) tall building in Deutz, Cologne

Coordinates: 50°56′25.50″N 6°58′18″E

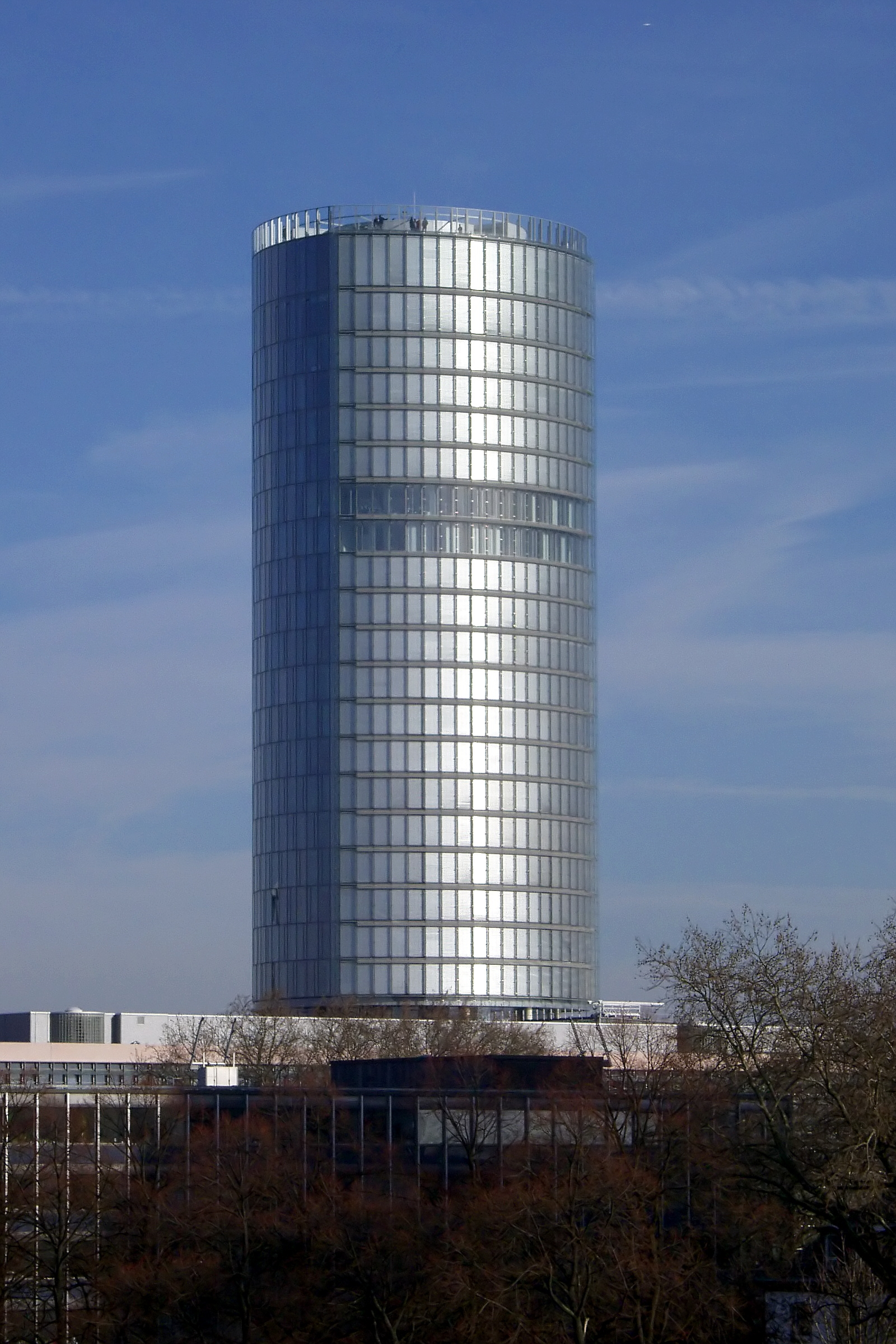
KölnTriangle in 2008

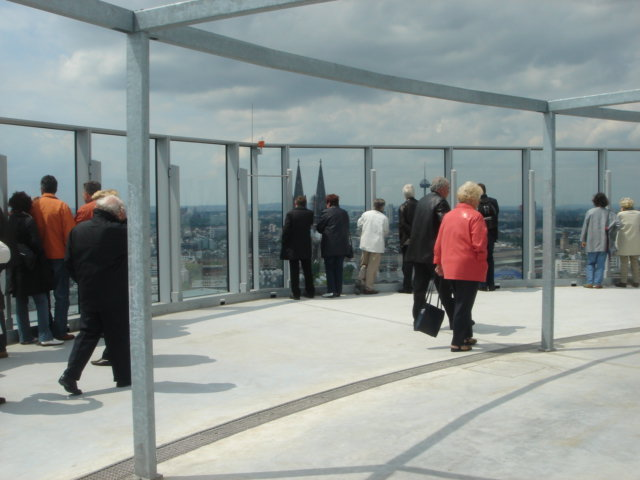
Observation level

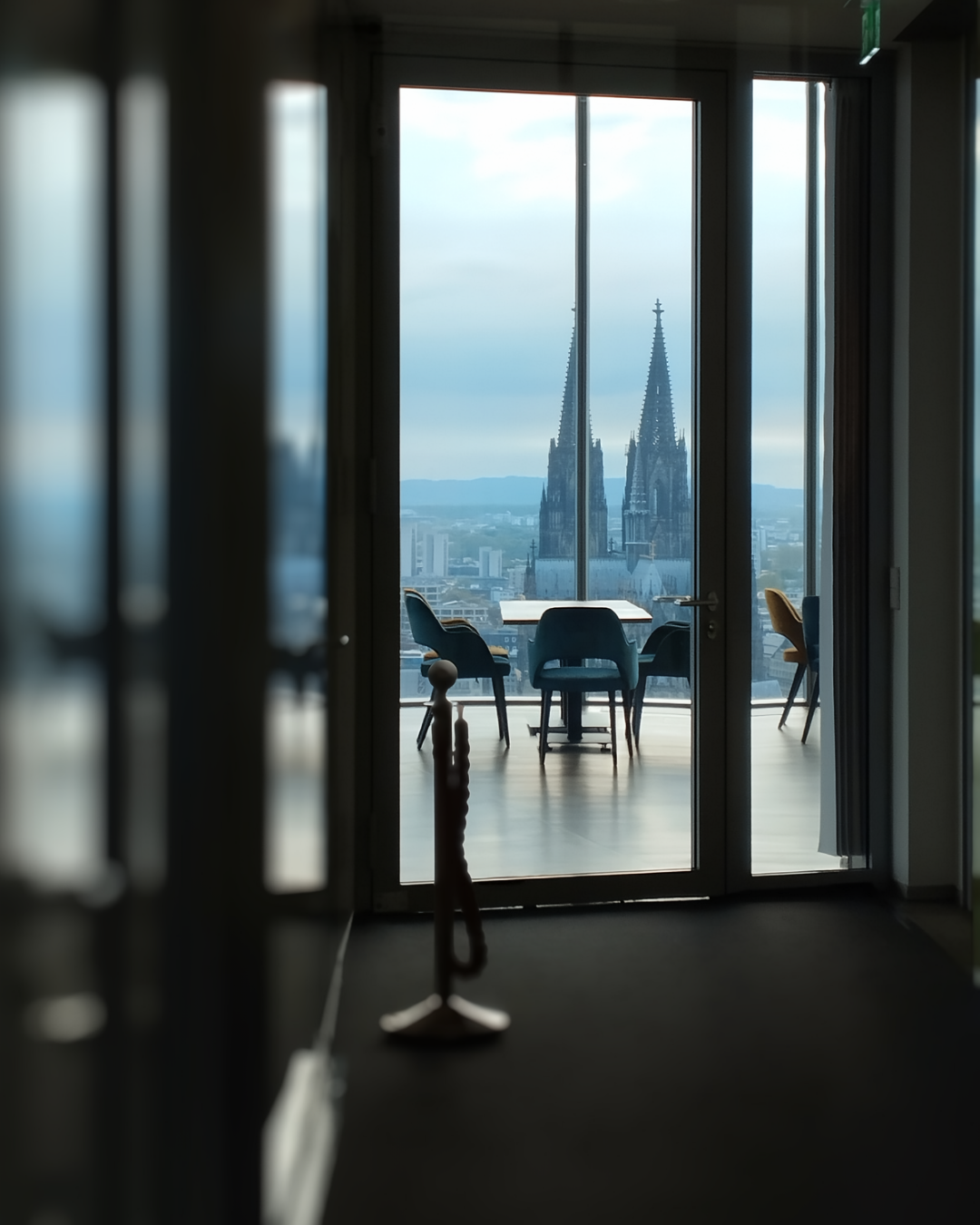
Cologne Cathedral from the Cologne Triangle

KölnTriangle (formerly also known as LVR-Turm) is a 103.2-metre (339 ft) tall building in Deutz, Cologne, and a prominent landmark in Cologne. The building was designed by Dörte Gatermann of Cologne-based architecture firm Gatermann + Schossig and completed in 2006. Its south facade consists of a double-facade, allowing natural ventilation even at high floors. Next to the high-rise structure, part of KölnTriangle is also a much larger six-story office block with a total gross floor area of 84,300 m^{2} (907,000 sq ft).

KölnTriangle is headquarters of the European Aviation Safety Agency (EASA). The top floor and roof houses a publicly accessible observation deck with panorama views all over Cologne, in particular Cologne Cathedral, directly opposite the Rhine. Located at the second-to-top floor is a restaurant with a panoramic views over the city directly below the observation deck. This also serves as an event venue when the restaurant is closed.

== See also ==
- List of tallest buildings in Germany
