= Emirates Towers =

Twin tower complex in Dubai, UAE

- أبراج الإمارات
- The Emirates Towers in 2023
- Interactive map of the Emirates Towers area

General information
- Location: Sheikh Zayed Road, Trade Centre 2, Dubai, United Arab Emirates
- Coordinates: 25°13′02″N 55°16′59″E
- Construction started: 1996
- Completed: 1999
- Opening: 15 April 2000

Height
- Roof: 355 m (1,165 ft), 309 m (1,014 ft)

Technical details
- Floor count: 56, 54
- Lifts/elevators: 17, 12

Design and construction
- Architect: Hazel Wong
- Main contractor: Multiplex, Besix

The Emirates Towers (Arabic: أبراج الإمارات) is a building complex in Dubai that contains the Emirates Office Tower and Jumeirah Emirates Towers Hotel, which are connected by a 9,000 m^{2} (96,875 ft^{2}) two-story retail complex known as "The Boulevard". The entire complex is owned by Sheikh Mohammed Bin Rashid Al Maktoum. The two towers, which rise to 354.6 m (1,163 ft) tall to the tip and 241.4 m (792 ft) high of occupied space, respectively, stand as the 51st tallest buildings in the world and 11th tallest in Dubai.

Emirates Towers framing the Burj Khalifa

The Emirates Towers complex is located on the Sheikh Zayed Road in Dubai, United Arab Emirates, and is a symbol of the city of Dubai. The Emirates Office Tower was constructed by the construction wing of Al Ghurair Investment group and the Emirates Hotel Tower was built by Ssangyong and BESIX subsidiary Six Construct. The hotel has 400 rooms. A curiosity of the design is that the towers have a similar number of floors; the taller office tower actually contains 56 floors above ground, while the hotel tower contains 54 floors. This is because the individual floor heights of the office tower are greater than that of the hotel. The building also contains 17 elevators inside. The grounds of these towers are so vast that one of the most popular features of the Emirates Towers are peacocks belonging to the nearby Zabeel Palace that are left to roam around.

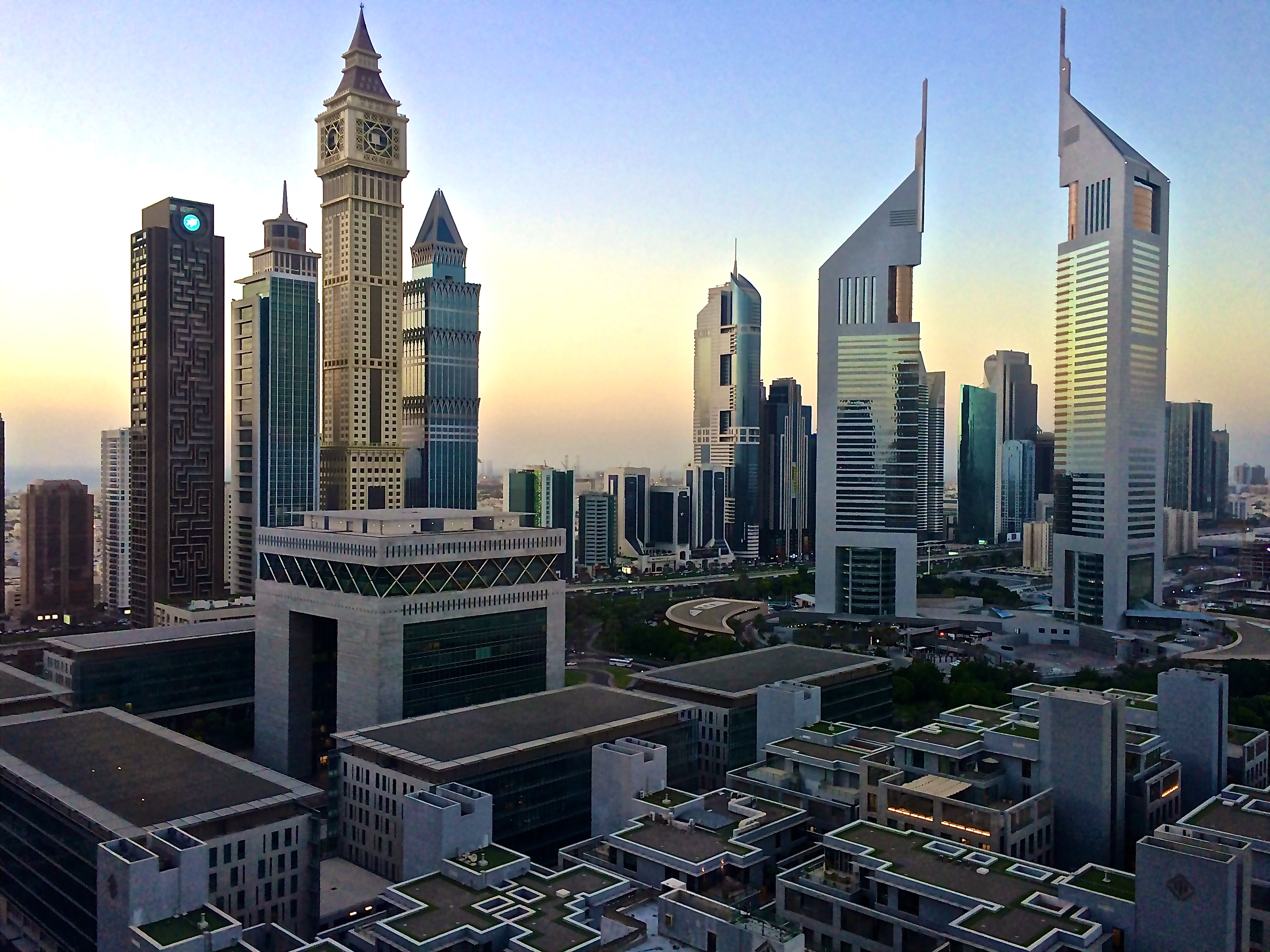
Dubai skyline view with Emirates Towers at right

The Emirates Towers complex is set in over 570,000 m^{2} (141 acres) of gardens, with lakes, waterfalls and public seating areas. There is parking space for up to 1,500 cars.

For a period of time, these towers were the tallest buildings in Dubai.

In 2019, Marcus Sutton was appointed General Manager of the Jumeirah Emirates Towers.
