= E1 Tower =

Skyscraper in the Kurdistan Region, Iraq

Erbil One Tower
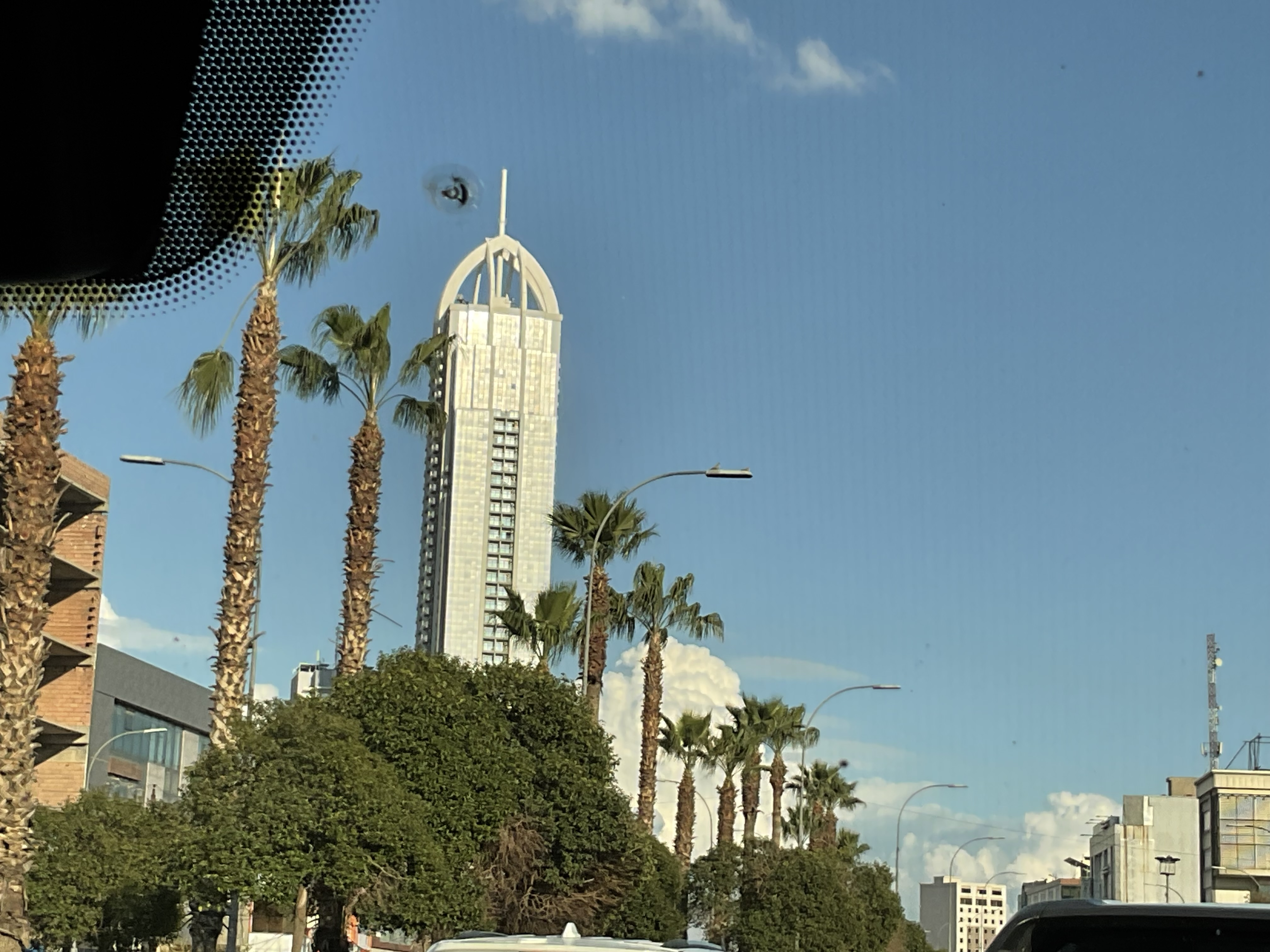
- Interactive map of the Erbil One Tower area

General information
- Status: Completed
- Architectural style: Postmodern
- Location: 60m Street, Erbil, Iraq
- Coordinates: 36°10′29.2″N 44°00′21.9″E
- Construction started: 2019
- Completed: 2022-2023
- Cost: $35,000,000
- Owner: Eng. Sabah Noori Ali

Height
- Height: 172m 180 m (591 ft)

Technical details
- Structural system: Bearing Wall System
- Material: Reinforced Concrete
- Floor count: 50
- Floor area: 44,480 m^{2} (478,779 sq ft)
- Lifts/elevators: 8

Design and construction
- Architect: Eng. Rapar Wali Jabbar
- Structural engineer: Dr. Bahman O. Taha; MSc. Kovan Azeez

Other information
- Parking: 400+

Website
- www.kirmanj.com

The Erbil 1 Tower, also known as Zaniary Tower, is a 48-story, 180 m (591 ft) tall multi-use skyscraper in the heart of Erbil, capital of the Kurdistan Region of Iraq. It is located In Zaniary next to the Road That splits it from Mahabad. The E1 Tower is the second tallest building in Iraq. The project was part of Kirmanj Construction Company owned by Eng. Sabah Noori Ali whose objective is to develop and revitalize the area, opening new opportunities for people and enhancing the quality and standard of living of people in the area. The building is of reinforced concrete and all the concrete totaling up to 40,000 m3 is being supplied by Lafarge company, the leading concrete supplier in Iraq and internationally.

== Overview ==
Construction of the project began in 2019 and it was completed in 2022-2023. The project as a whole is a great boost to Erbil's economy opening over 300 job opportunities and improving the infrastructure of the city. The building has 46 above ground floors and 2 underground floors. It will include over 400 apartments and 400 parking stalls. It also includes an open view restaurant and dedicated office-use floor and other facilities such as a gymnasium, indoor swimming pool, saunas, ...etc. The building is serviced by 8 elevators on the lower floors with varying speeds to keep waiting times for upper story residents to a minimum.

== Design ==
=== Architectural ===
The architect of the building is Eng. Rapar Wali Jabbar, whom opted for a post-modern architectural style with a façade of glass curtain walls covering the building to provide future residents with full view of the city and countryside. The tip of the building features arches derived from those of Erbil's Citadel which is unique to the structure.

=== Structural ===
The structural engineers of the building are Dr. Bahman O. Taha and MSc. Kovan Azeez, whom designed the structure as a reinforced concrete frame coupled with concrete shear walls. Due to the location of E1 Tower it lies near the Arabian-Eurasian fault line, thus the region is seismically active and recently in 2017 experienced a Richter 7.2 magnitude earthquake. The region can also be impacted by fast wind gusts from the surrounding flat plains and low lands. So great care was taken in designing the lateral-force-resisting system of the building to minimize side swaying of the upper floors and provide the required strength. Thus it's composed of reinforced concrete shear walls, of up to 7m long and 60 cm wide on the lower floors, with a central concrete core to house the elevators and act as the building's spine when it comes to load carrying.

The building lies on Erbil's clay soil strata so the design required a deep foundation. Furthermore, the engineer specified 226 piles of up to 27m deep a with the piles being capped at the top with a concrete cap of 2.5m in depth. Also the floors are of reinforced concrete slabs supported by beams but on the lower parking floors the use of two-way ribbed slab was utilized, due to its economy and versatility.

=== Gallery ===
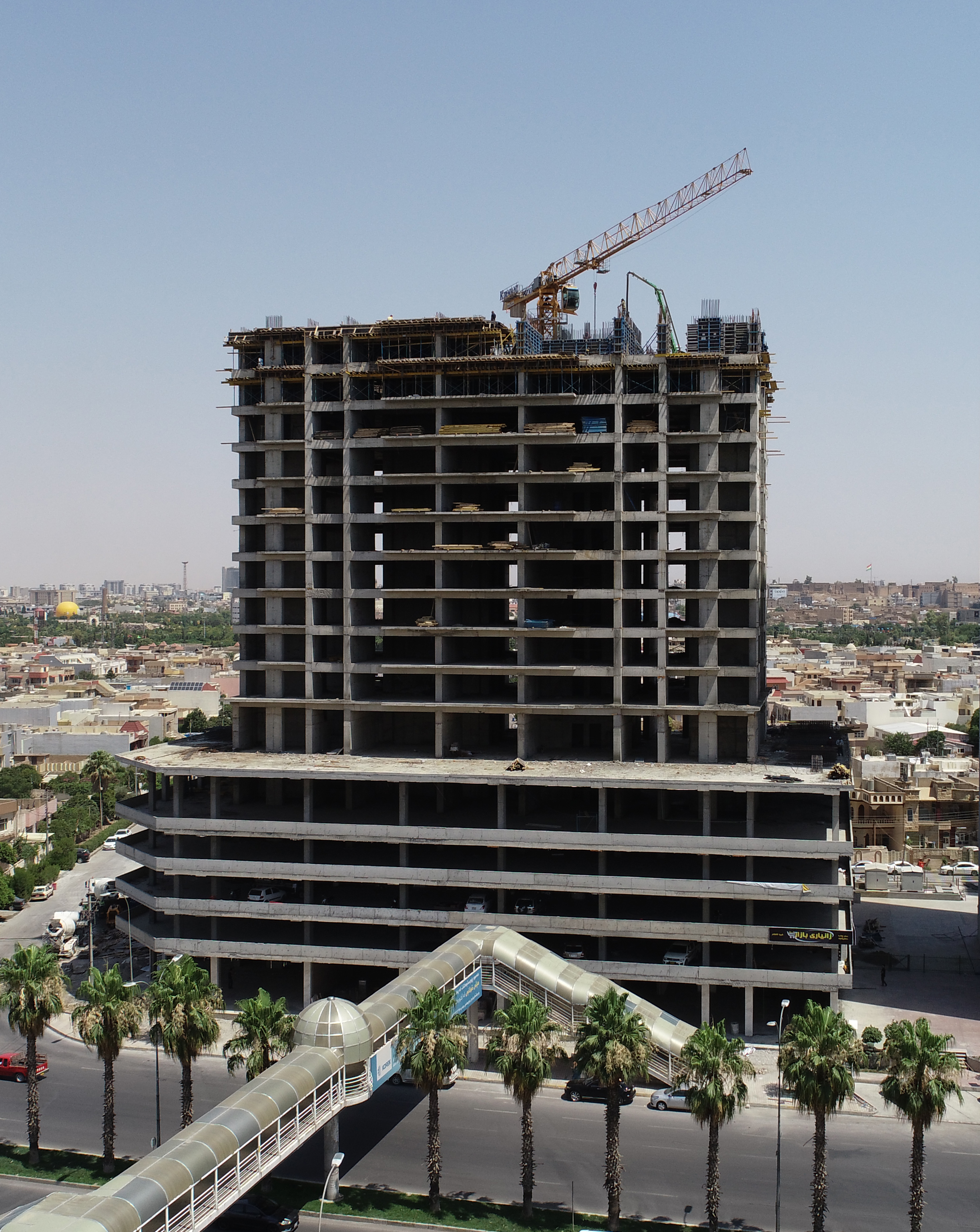
15th floor construction on July 5, 2020

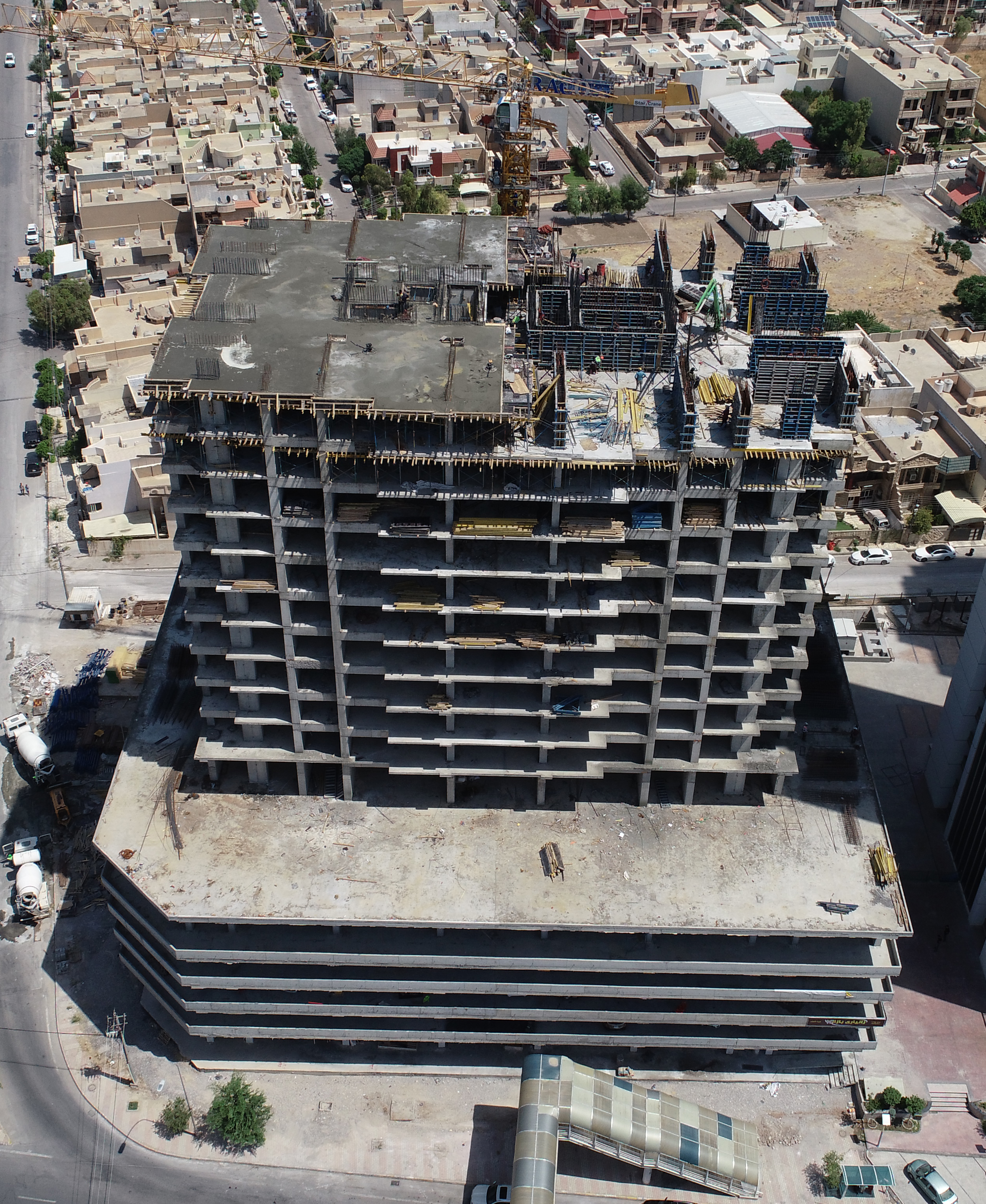
15th floor construction aerial view
