= The Emerald (building) =

Skyscraper in Seattle, Washington, U.S.

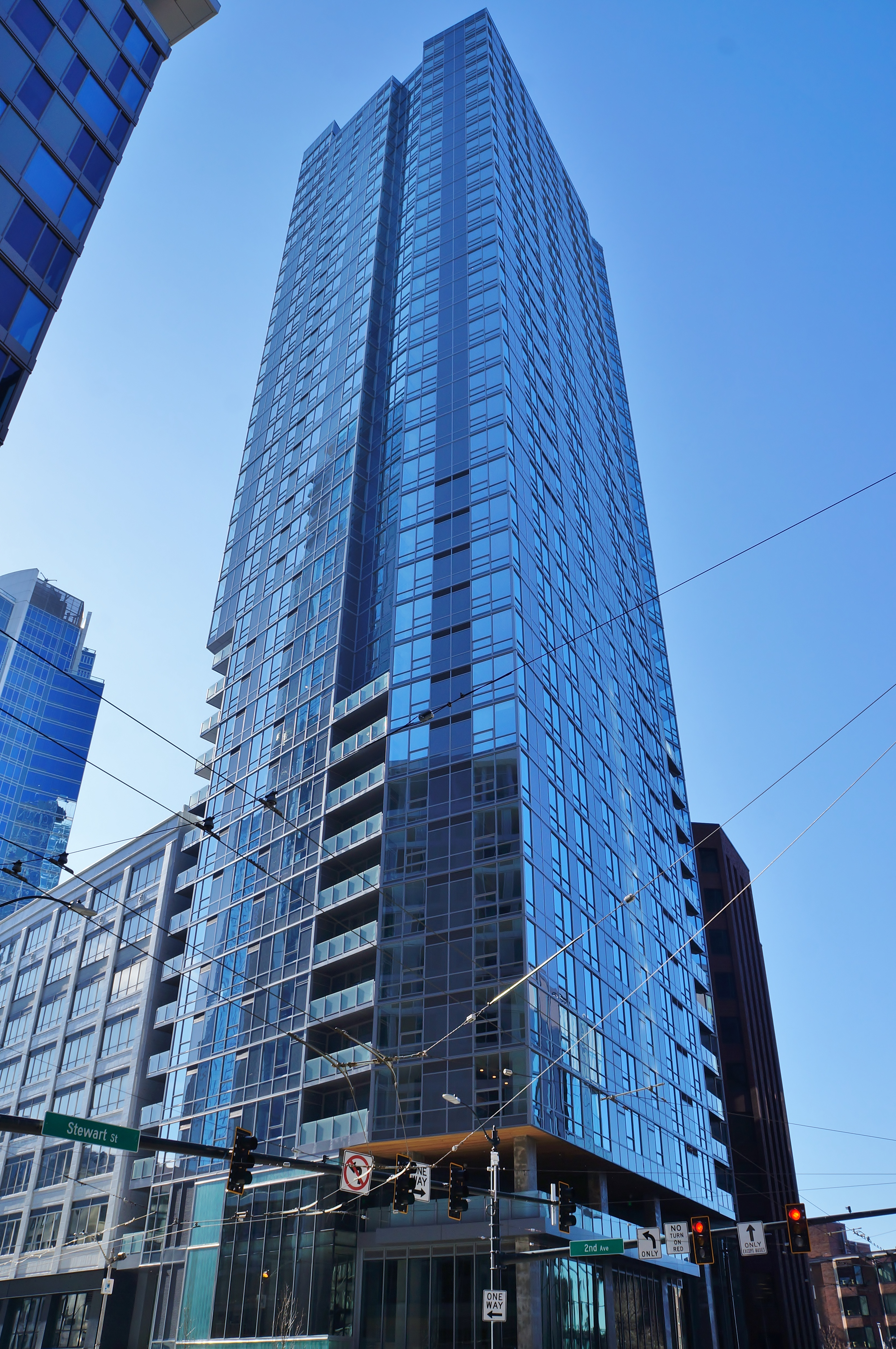

- Location within downtown Seattle

General information
- Status: Completed
- Type: Residential
- Location: 1613 2nd Avenue; Seattle, Washington, U.S.
- Coordinates: 47°36′38″N 122°20′26″W
- Construction started: July 2017
- Topped-out: July 2019
- Completed: October 2020

Height
- Architectural: 439 ft (134 m)
- Top floor: 400 ft (120 m)

Technical details
- Floor count: 40

Design and construction
- Architecture firm: Hewitt Architects
- Developer: Daniels Create World Seattle, LLC
- Main contractor: Andersen Construction

Other information
- Number of units: 262 condominiums
- Parking: 63 spaces

The Emerald is a mixed-use 40-story skyscraper in downtown Seattle, Washington, United States. The tower includes 262 luxury condominiums, retail space, and amenity spaces on outdoor terraces. It began construction in July 2017 and was completed in October 2020.

== History ==
The site, at the southwest corner of 2nd Avenue and Stewart Street, was home to the two-story Ames Building (also known as the MJA Building) from 1914 to 2017. Atlanta-based real estate developers Wood Partners filed plans to develop a 400-foot (120 m) residential tower at the site in March 2014, while property owner Principal Global Investors submitted the Ames Building for landmark status. The Landmarks Preservation Board rejected landmark status for the Ames Building in August, allowing for it to be demolished for the new tower. Wood Partners and Hewitt Architects submitted an initial design plan to the city in December, proposing that the tower's upper 24 stories cantilever over the adjacent Broadacres Building.

After a series of design review meetings in 2015, the number of residential units in the building was reduced from 230 to 177, and the number of parking spaces was increased and split between underground and above-grade levels. The project and property was sold to a Chinese developer, Create World America, for $17.1 million in June 2016, with plans to convert the residential units into condominiums. A revised design with 266 condominiums, additional retail space, and reduced, underground-only parking was unveiled in January 2017, along with the building's name, "The Emerald", inspired by Seattle's nickname of the "Emerald City".

Construction of The Emerald began in July 2017 and it was topped out two years later. It was originally scheduled to be complete by March 2020, but was pushed back to September due to the COVID-19 pandemic. As of February 2020, 25 percent of units at The Emerald had been reserved by buyers. The building was completed in October 2020.

== Design ==
The Emerald is 40 stories tall, consisting of a two-story glass podium with 4,600 square feet (430 m^{2}) of retail space and 38 stories of condominiums. The building's 262 condominiums include one-, two-, and three-bedroom units that range from 569 to 1,189 square feet (52.9 to 110.5 m^{2}). The upper floors include 22 penthouse units that cost between $2 million and $10.5 million for a 4,000-square-foot (370 m^{2}) unit. The upper 23 floors cantilever 14 feet (4.3 m) over the adjacent Broadacres Building, expanding the floorplate from 7,350 square feet (683 m^{2}) at street level to 9,100 square feet (850 m^{2}). Two amenity areas, located on the rooftop and on the third floor, include a fitness center, pet spa, yoga studio, and outdoor balconies with views of Pike Place Market and the Olympic Mountains. Residents also have access to a fleet of on-demand Tesla electric cars through a smartphone app. The Emerald has 62 parking stalls, the lowest stalls-per-unit ratio of any new residential building in Downtown Seattle, and has 20 additional spaces leased from the adjacent Thompson Hotel.
