= Jockey Club Innovation Tower =

Building of the Hong Kong Polytechnic University

Innovation Tower
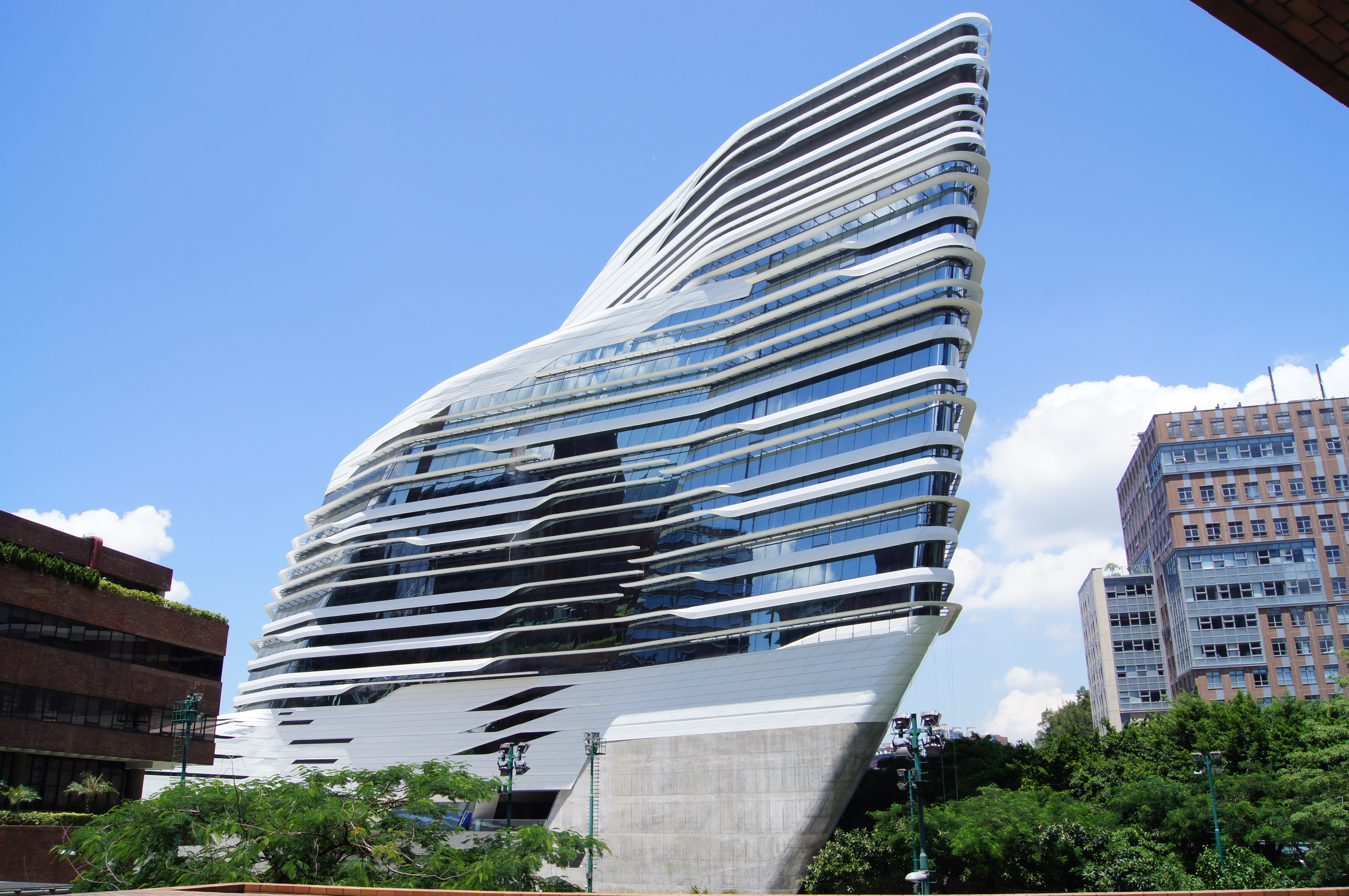
- East elevation, 2013
- Interactive map of the Innovation Tower area
- Alternative names: Jockey Club Innovation Tower

General information
- Status: Completed
- Location: Hong Kong Polytechnic University, Hung Hom Campus, Hung Hom, Kowloon, Hong Kong
- Coordinates: 22°18′20″N 114°10′45″E
- Construction started: 2007
- Completed: 2014

Dimensions
- Other dimensions: Height 76 metres (249 ft)

Technical details
- Floor area: 15,000 square metres (160,000 sq ft)

Design and construction
- Architect: Zaha Hadid

Jockey Club Innovation Tower is a building of the Hong Kong Polytechnic University located on Chatham Road South in Hung Hom district, Kowloon. It was designed by Pritzker-prize-winning architect Zaha Hadid. This building is her first permanent work in Hong Kong. Originally expected to be completed by the end of 2011, it was not finished until 2014.

== Aesthetics ==
Zaha Hadid's firm won the competition to design the building in 2007. The competition brief called for "a beacon structure symbolising and driving the development of Hong Kong as a design hub in Asia." She and her team took as their guiding principle the "collateral flexibility" between the departments to be housed in the building. Their solution was to "dissolve ... the classic typography of tower and podium to create a seamlessly fluid new structure ... creat[ing] a building which is inherently organised and understood to visitors from the point of entry."

Athletic fields surrounding the building were razed to create a new surrounding landscape. The main pedestrian entrance was placed at podium level, as with the other buildings on campus. A long pathway from nearby Suen Chi Sun Memorial Square to an open foyer creates a focal point, where the building space opens to shops, a cafeteria, museum, and exhibition area.

== Location and size ==
The tower is located at the northwestern tip of the university campus. Upon completion, the tower provided some 12,000 square metres (130,000 sq ft) of net operational floor area and is able to accommodate about 1,800 staff and students.

== Academic uses ==
The tower houses the School of Design (SD) and supports the development of its specialisations, namely Environmental Design, Industrial and Product Design, Visual Communication, Advertising as well as Digital Design.

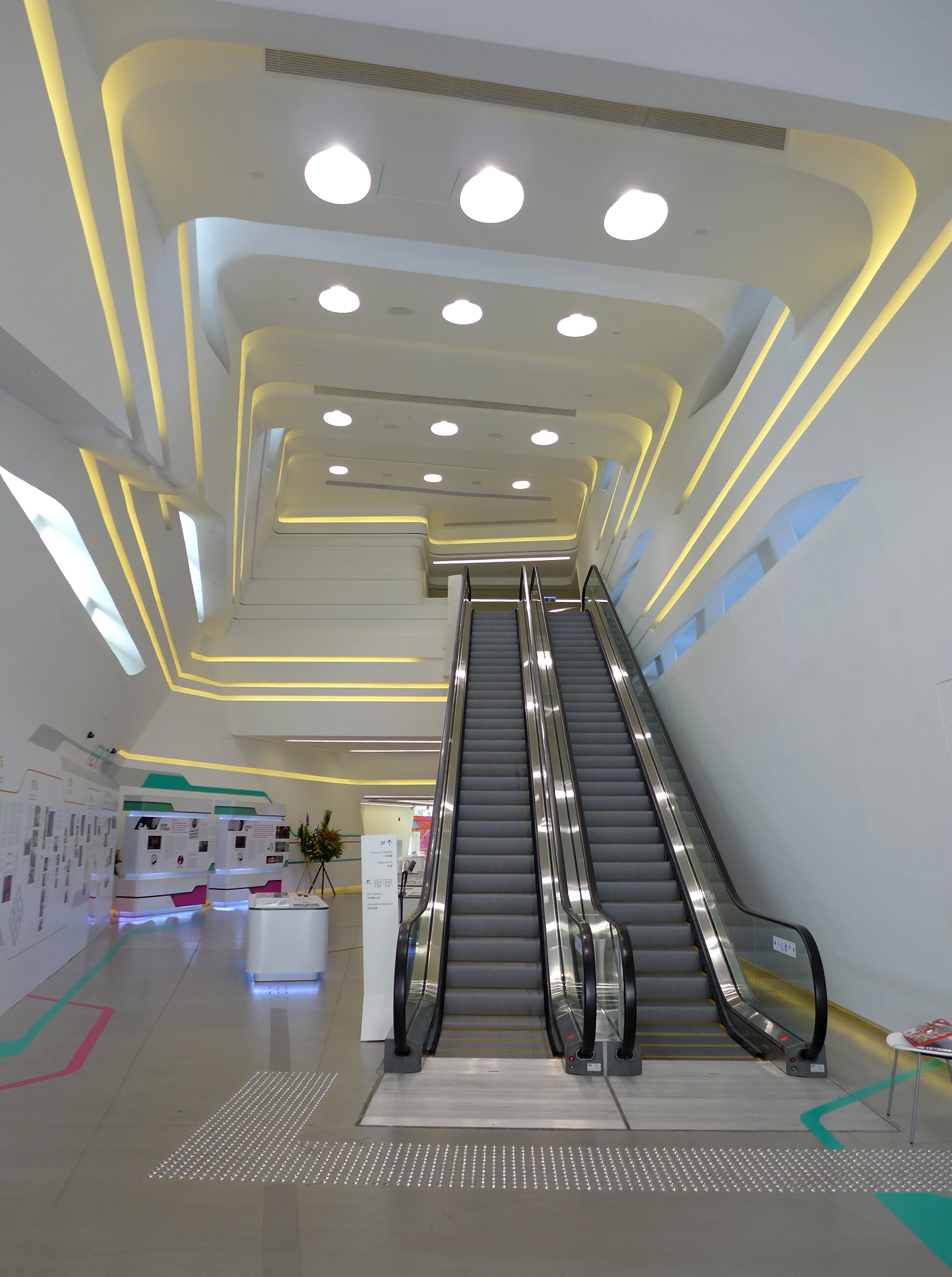
Entrance Atrium

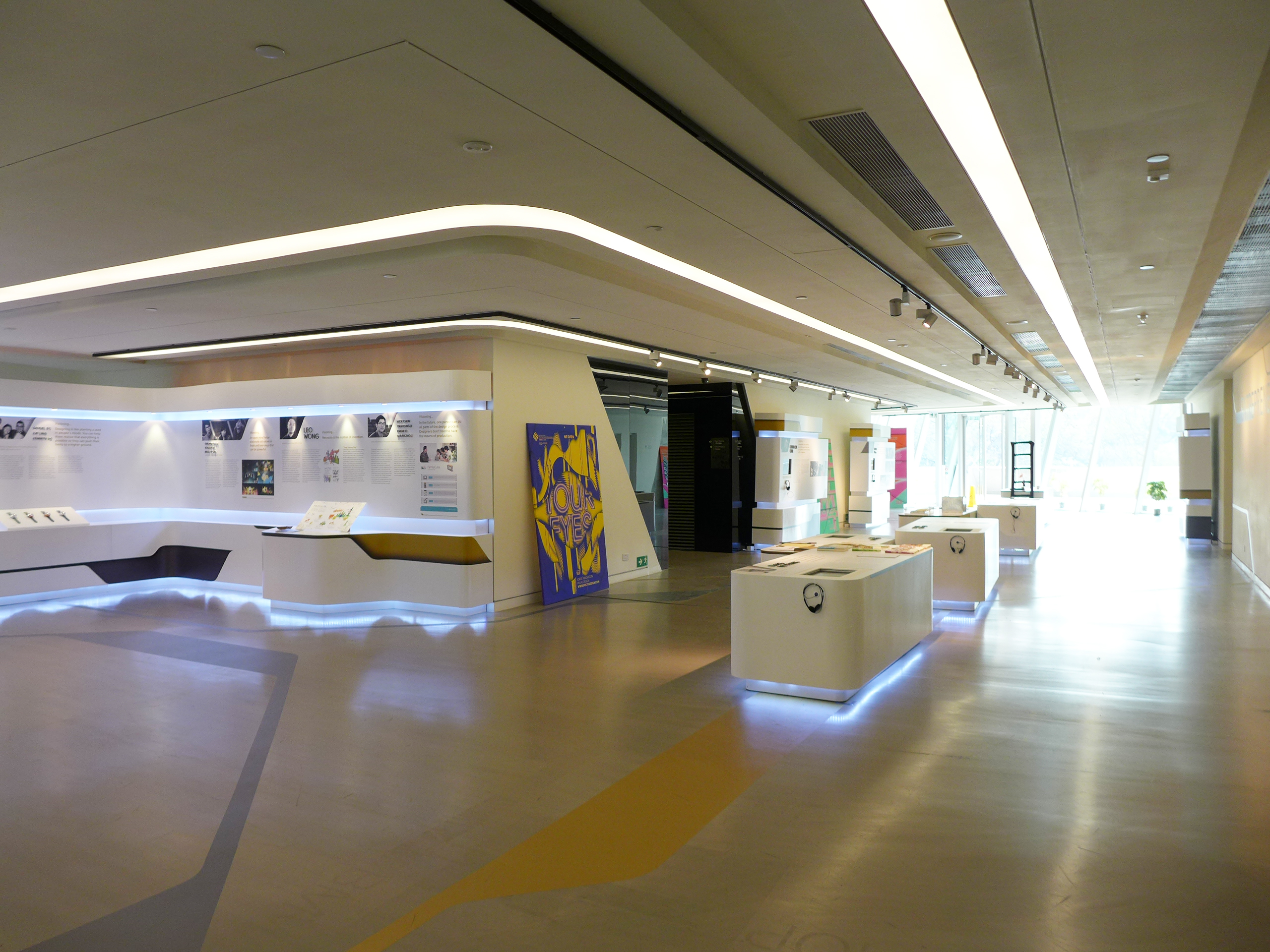
Exhibition Gallery on Podium Floor

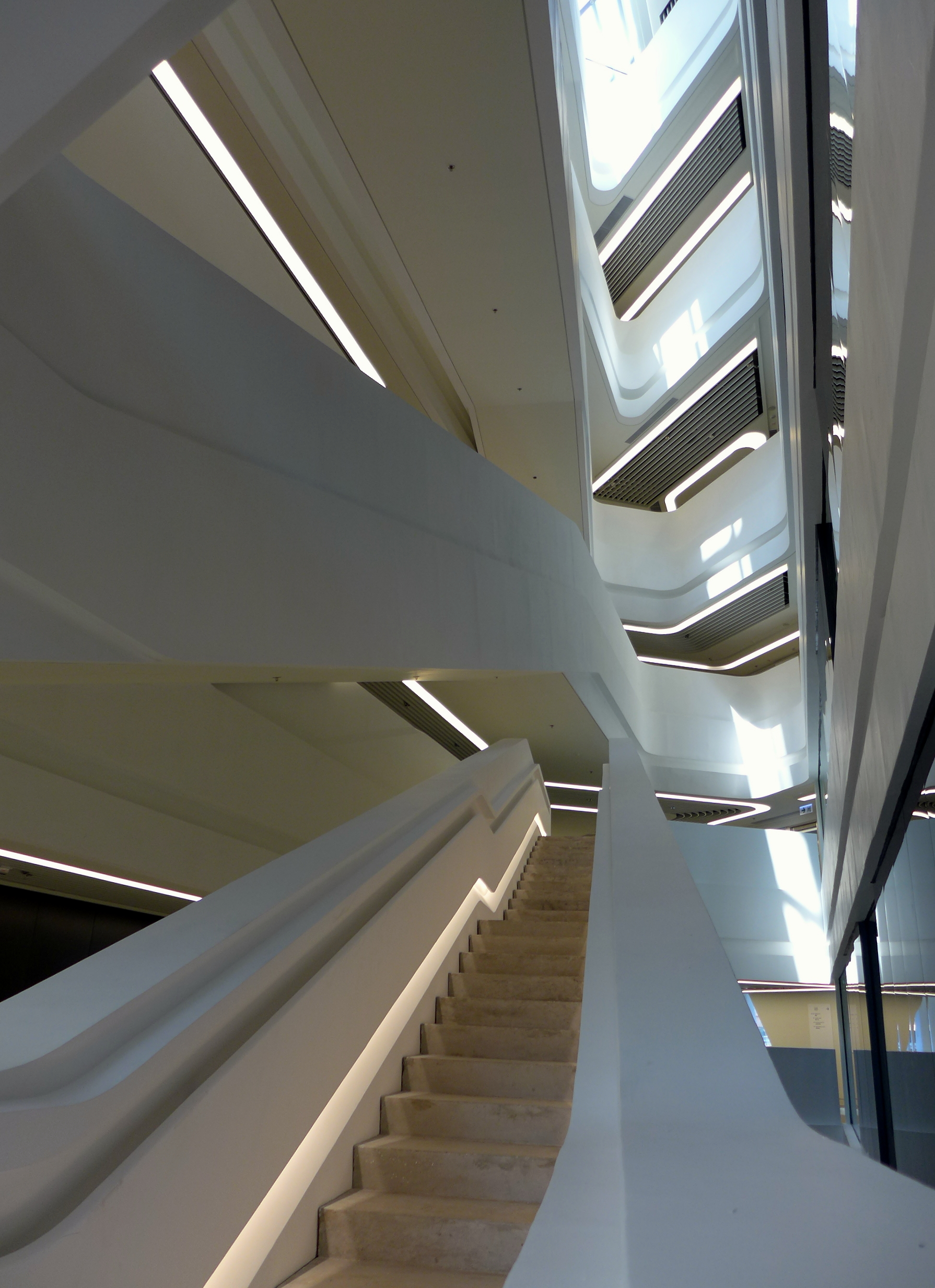
Stairs inside the tower

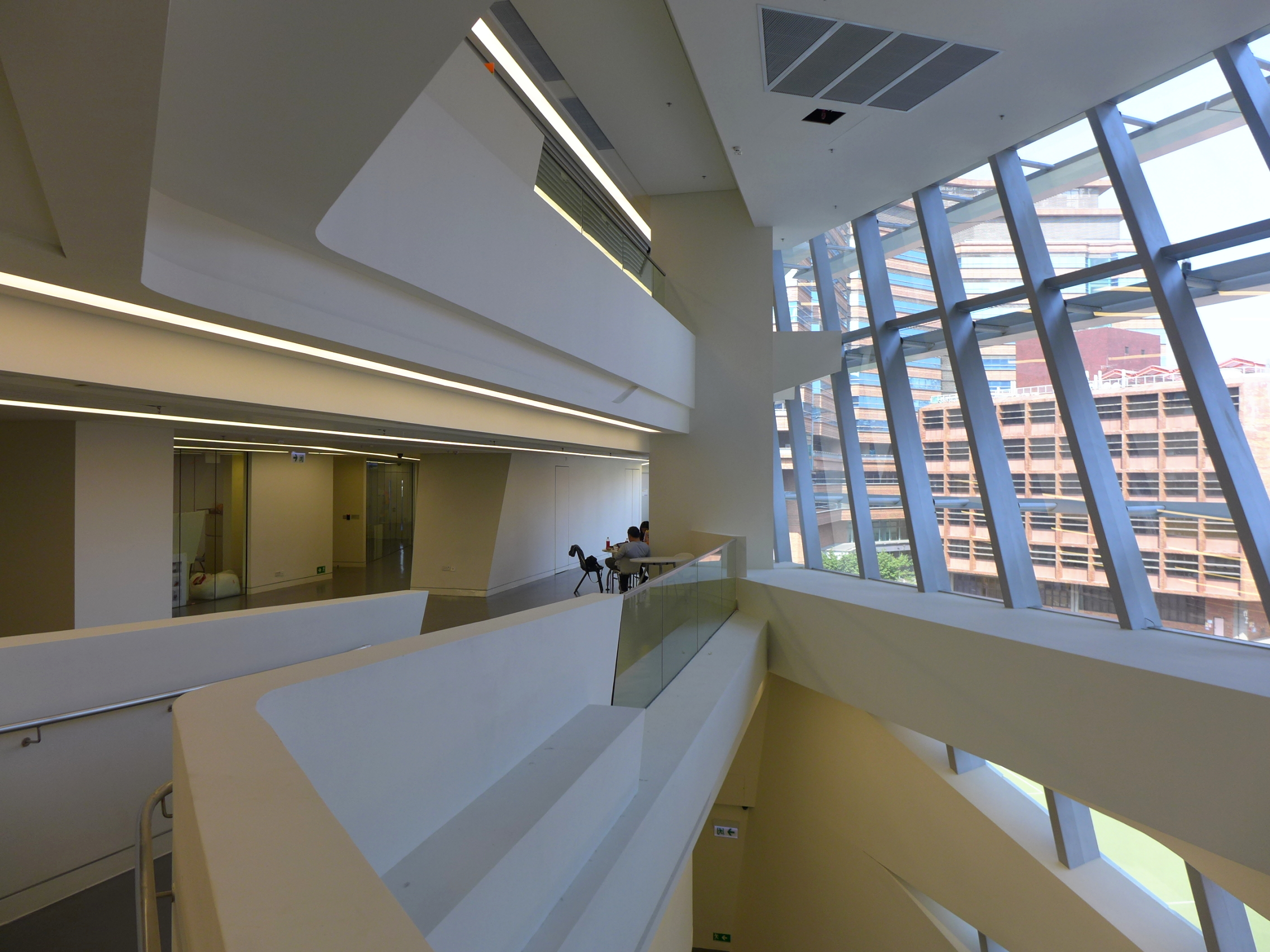
Common area

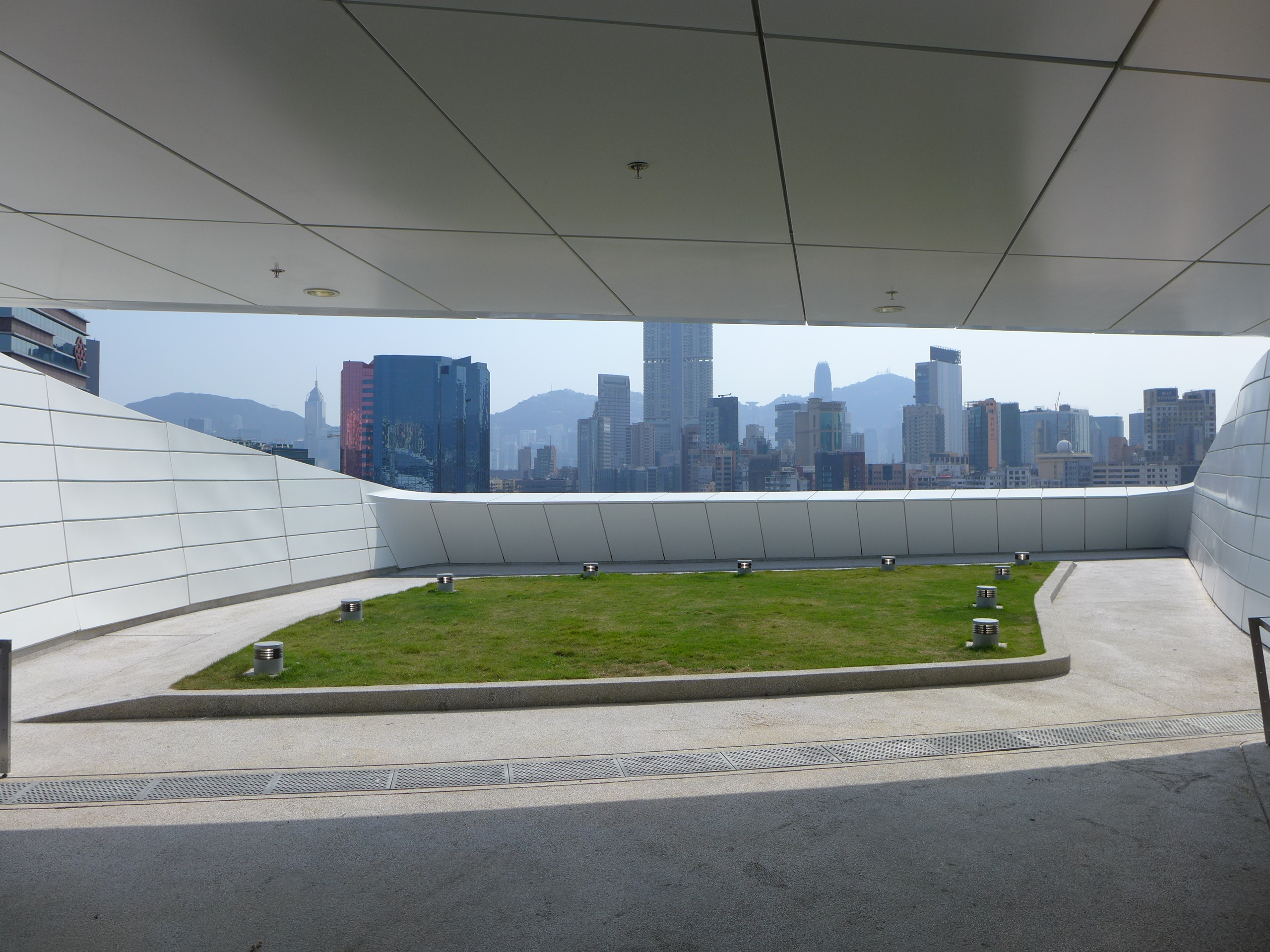
Outdoor Podium

== Funding ==
In July 2011, the Hong Kong Jockey Club approved funding of HK$249 million for the Innovation Tower. The tower was therefore renamed Jockey Club Innovation Tower.
