= Hazel Wong =

Hong Kong-born Emirati architect

- Born: Hong Kong
- Occupation: Architect
- Practice: Associated architectural firm[s]
- Buildings: Emirates Towers

Hazel Wong is an architect. She lives and works in the United Arab Emirates.

== Life and work ==
Hazel Wong was born in Hong Kong. She lived in Canada and the United States before taking up her current place of residence in the United Arab Emirates.

=== Emirates Towers ===
Hazel Wong designed the Emirates Towers in Dubai in 1998, which were completed in 2000. In 1996, Shaikh Mohammad Bin Rashid Al Maktoum, the Vice President and Prime Minister of the United Arab Emirates and Ruler of Dubai, initiated a competition aimed at the creation of the two largest towers in the Middle East, Europe, and Africa. This competition led to the collaboration with Hazel Wong which resulted in the Emirates Towers. The Emirates Towers complex was the tenth tallest building in the world at the time of its completion.

The taller tower, known as Emirates Tower One, contains offices and stands at 350 meters; with 54 floors. The shorter tower, known as Emirates Tower Two, serves as a 56 floor hotel and stands at 305 meters. Both buildings are topped by a 43.7m tall needle. They are connected by a two-story shopping complex known as the Boulevard. The office tower houses a number of financial and government offices such as the Office of the Prime Minister of the UAE, the Executive Council, and more recently the Dubai Future Accelerators Program, as well as a variety of young entrepreneurs and professionals. The office tower, nicknamed the "White House of Dubai", witnesses a high profile and diverse clientele. The hotel features a unique atrium which spans 31 floors. The hotel houses the Godolphin ballroom, a flotation therapy pool room at the Talise Spa, and the Chopard ladies-only floor rendering it one of the first hotels in the UAE to have a dedicated ladies floor. The towers stand on grounds that span 510,000 square meters or 42 acres. A famous sighting on these grounds are the freely roaming peacocks belonging to the Zabeel Palace.

The tower design features equilateral triangles, intended to incorporate traditional Islamic themes in modern architecture. The earth, sun, and moon are especially important symbols in Islam, thus, this triumvirate was conceptualized in the equilateral triangles that make up the towers. The triangles are paneled with aluminum allowing them to capture the changing sunlight, creating different perspectives of the towers. The aluminum paneling also allows the towers to reflect each other, creating a sense of movement. This is in line with Wong's design objectives: "to create the composition and placement of the twin towers to appear to be constantly changing, depending on the point of view and time of day." Aside from aluminum, Wong utilized glass, steel, and concrete in a variety of ways to form the complex roof top geometry and the four legged base of the triangular towers.

=== Serenia Residences ===
The Serenia Residences are 250 high end homes overlooking the Palm Jumierah and the Burj Al Arab. The homes are situated on the crescent of the Palm Jumeirah in three buildings which are connected by open spaces and a swimming pool. Since this residential project was inspired by the surrounding landscape, the design incorporates the natural beauty of the area using large glass windows and doors that let in natural light. These windows also allow for a clear view of the Persian Gulf. The simple design, large windows, and light colors were intended by Wong to create a "quiet elegance and a timeless feel."
