= Lakeshore East =

Urban development in Chicago, Illinois

Coordinates: 41°53′9.74″N 87°37′3.44″W

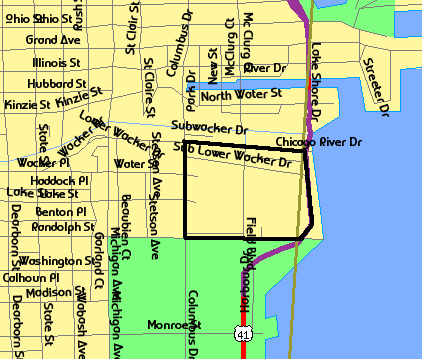
Lakeshore East map depiction

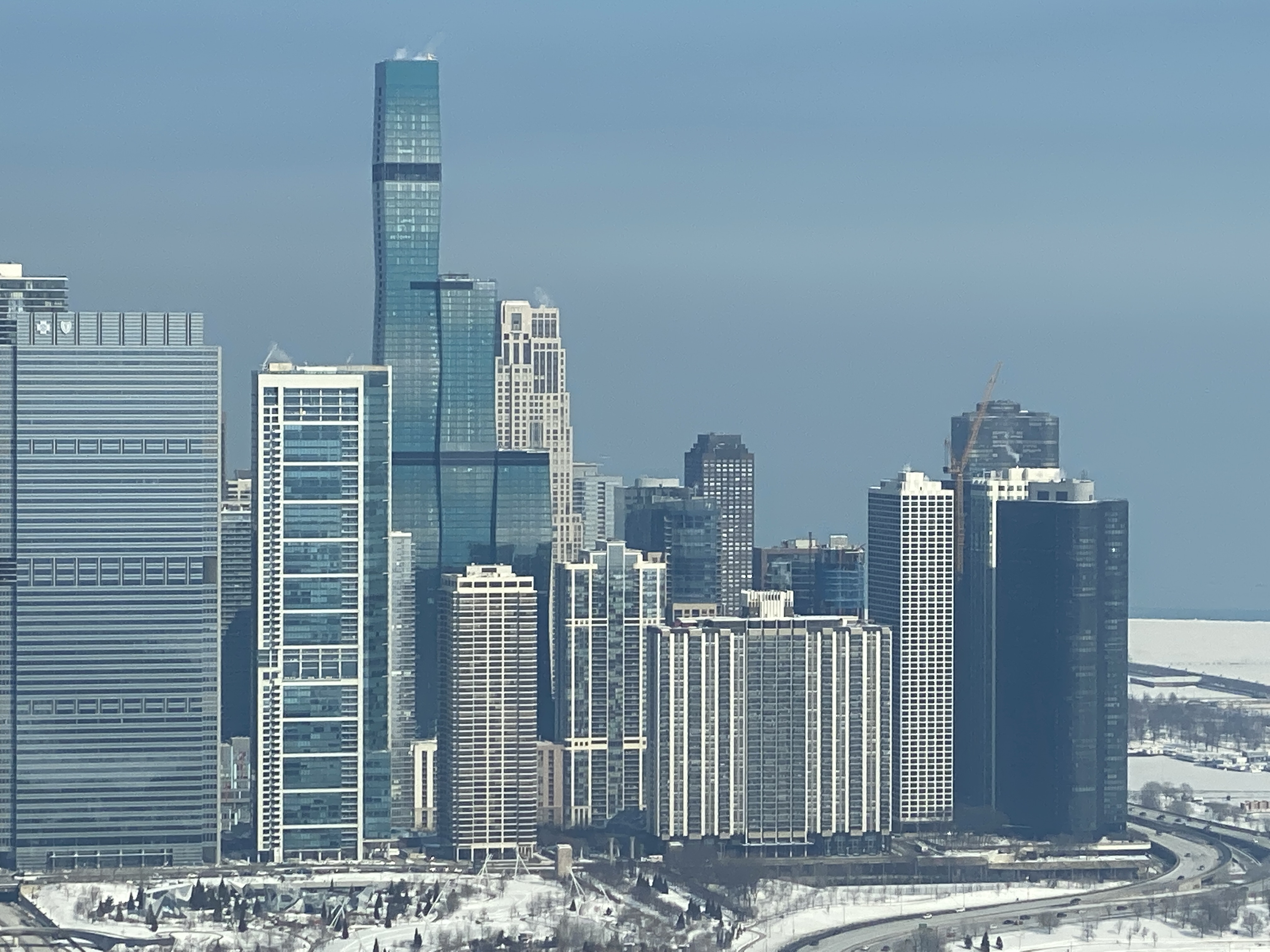
Lakeshore East from NEMA in 2021

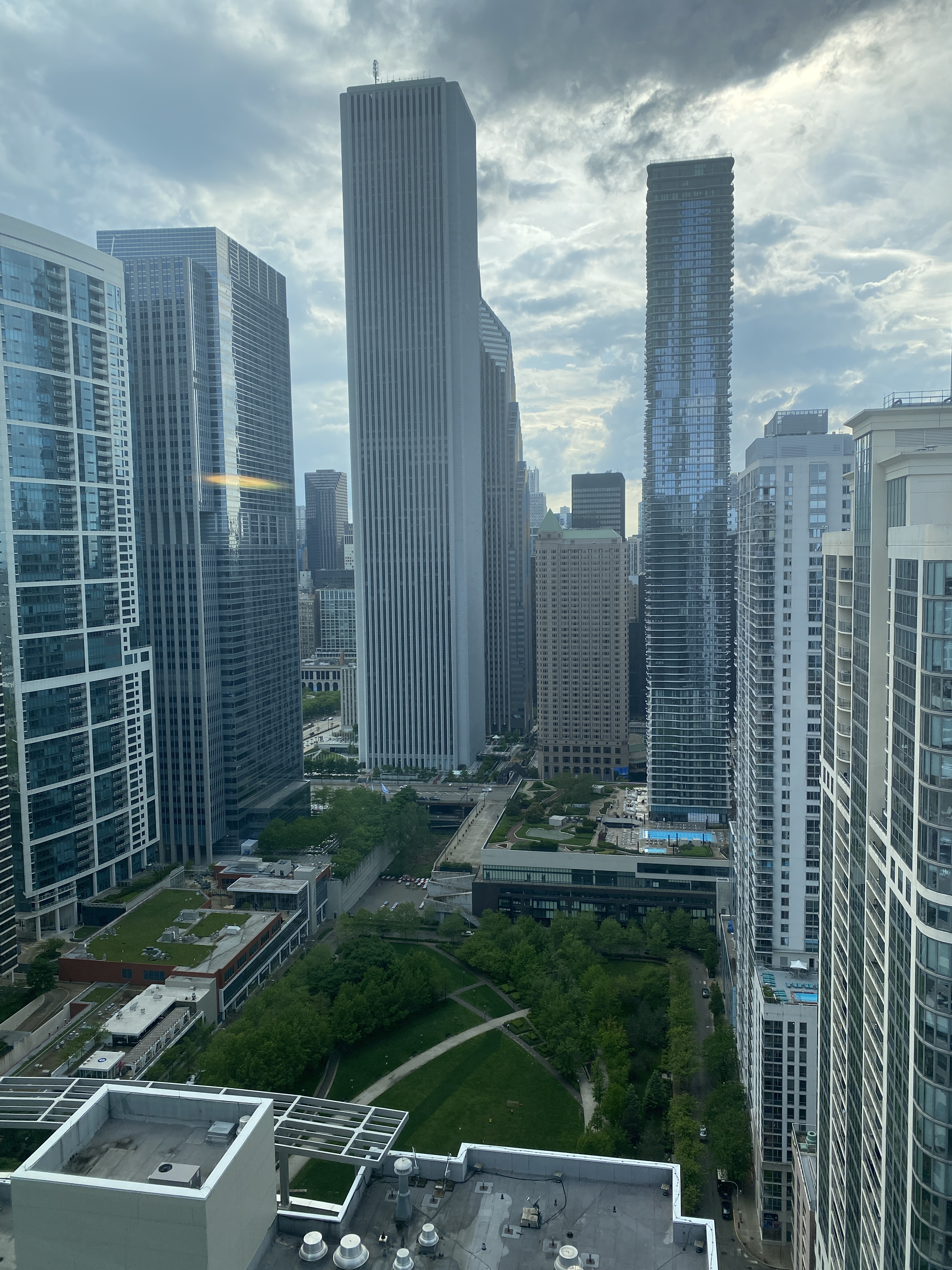
Lakeshore East from Cascade (east) with prominent views of Blue Cross Blue Shield Tower, Aon Center and Aqua May 2022

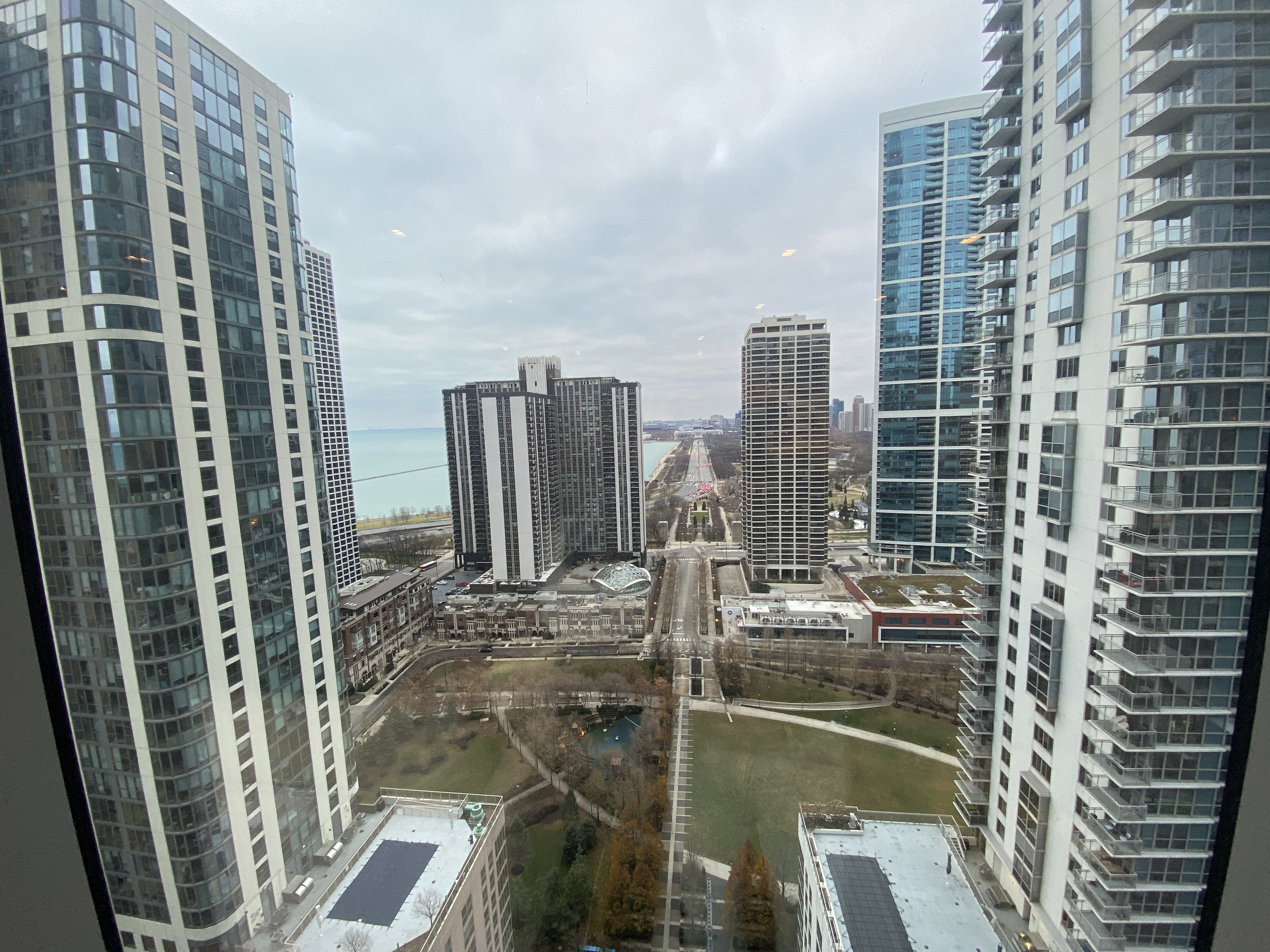
Lakeshore East from St. Regis Chicago (north) with prominent views of buildings and Lakeshore Drive in December 2022 File:

Lakeshore East is a master-planned mixed use urban development being built by the Magellan Development Group in the Loop community area of Chicago in Cook County, Illinois, United States. It is located in the northeastern part of the Loop, which, along with Illinois Center, is called the New Eastside. The development is bordered by Wacker Drive to the north, Columbus Drive to the west, Lake Shore Drive to the east, and East Randolph Street to the south. Skidmore, Owings & Merrill created the master plan for the area. The development, which had been scheduled for completion in 2011, was set for completion in 2013 by 2008. Development continued with revised plans for more buildings in 2018 and continuing construction of the Vista Tower in 2019.

Although the majority of the buildings in the neighborhood will be 21st century constructions resulting from the master plan, some of the current buildings were built as early as the 1960s and 1970s decades. Thus, the term "Lakeshore East" refers only to the components of the new master plan, while the term New Eastside refers to the greater neighborhood surrounding Lakeshore East that extends westward to Michigan Avenue. In the 1960s, Illinois Center near Michigan Avenue was developed. There is little formal distinction between buildings in the masterplan and other buildings in the neighborhood because the pre-existing buildings are referred to as being located in the Lakeshore East area.

Lakeshore East features several of the tallest buildings in Chicago and may include a few of the tallest buildings in the United States. The overall planned development, the park, and several of the individual buildings have won awards for architecture and/or urban planning. The buildings are planned for various types of residential use (condominiums, apartments, or hotels). Due to the neighborhood's proximity to both Lake Michigan to the east and the Chicago River to the north, many of the buildings are named with aquatic or nautical themes. As of August 2008, 1,500 condominiums have been sold and 1,200 apartments have been completed.

== History ==
Illinois Central Railroad yard and old Lake Shore Drive
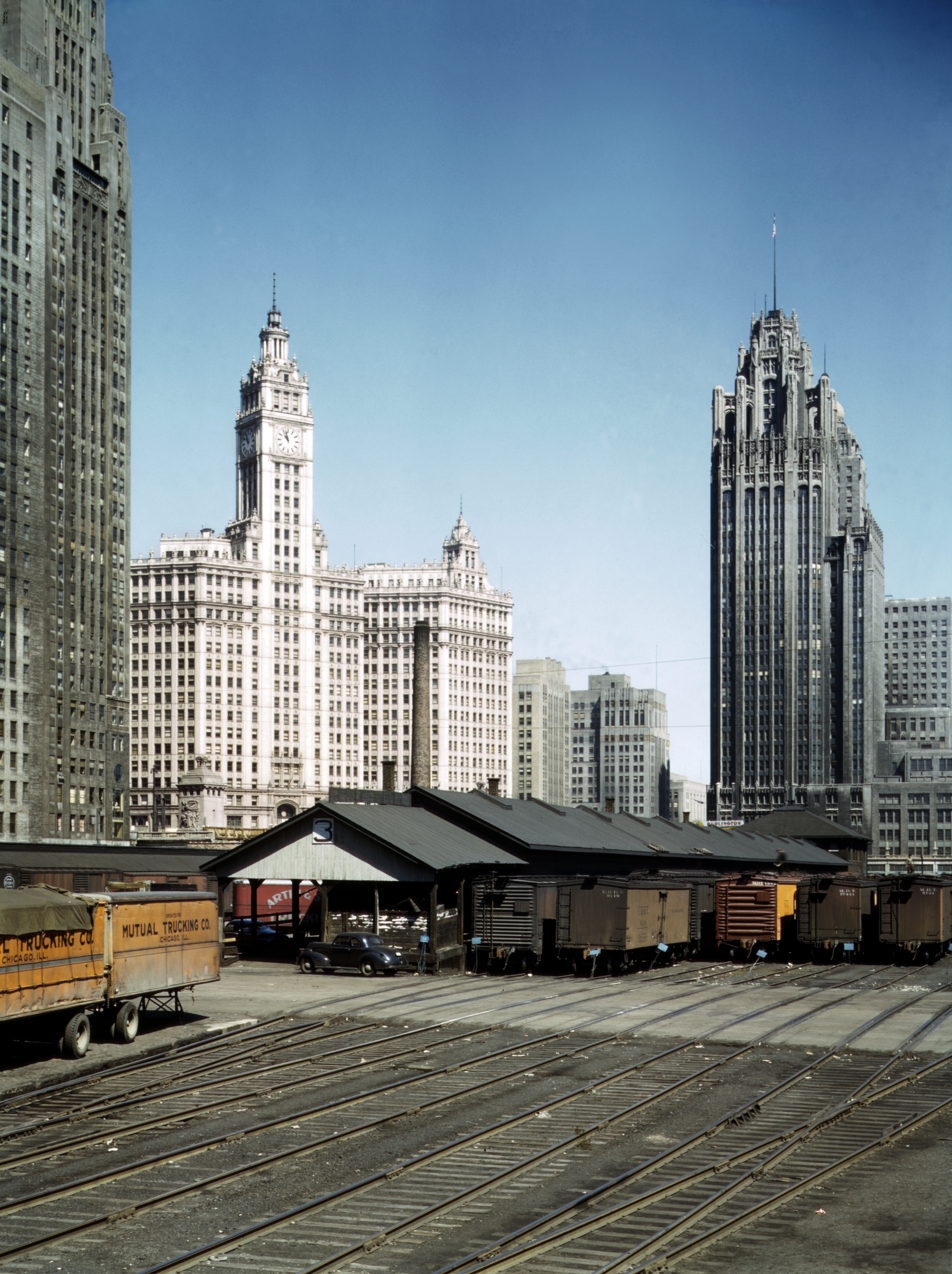
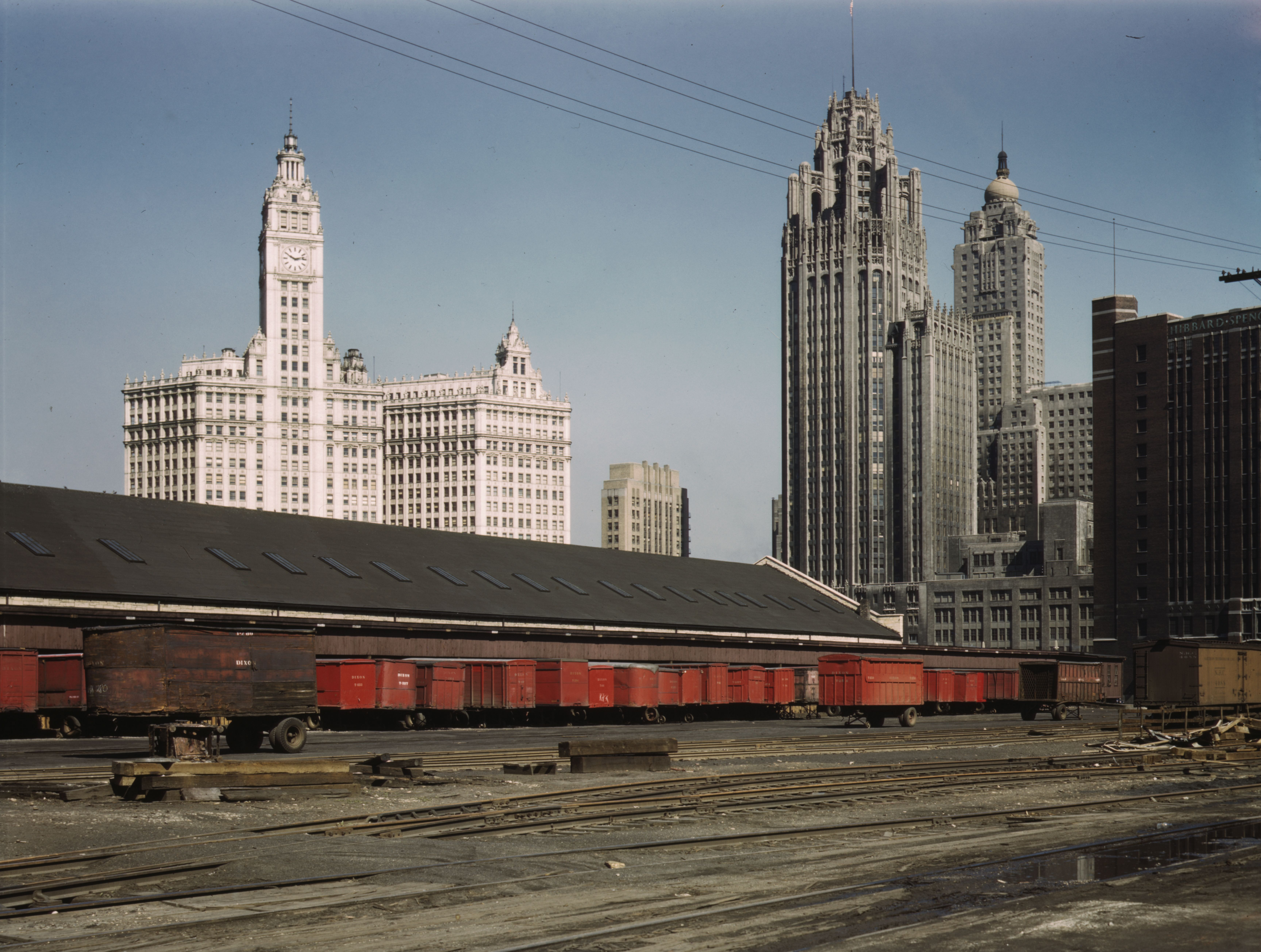
Freight terminal with 333 North Michigan Wrigley Building and Tribune Tower in the background (April 1943). Lake Shore Drive's old S-curve (1963)

Previous to this urban development, the Lakeshore East area had been used by Illinois Central Railroad yards. After World War II, the railroads sold airspace rights north of Randolph Street. For several years after the rail yards were vacated, the site was used as a 9-hole golf course. Pete Dye designed the course, known as Metro Golf at Illinois Center, which was completed in 1994 and closed in 2001. The area was originally planned for development as part of the Illinois Center, and one of the challenges to the new development was to integrate itself into the inherited triple-level street system while creating a visually appealing and pedestrian friendly neighborhood. The solution was to stagger ground-level amenities and building entrances from the upper level at the perimeter to the lower level at the interior. Thus the multilevel street grid is utilized around the edges, with large parking structures in the podiums, while a large park at the lowest level forms the core of the development. When the redevelopment was planned in 2001 and commenced in 2002, completion was anticipated to happen in 2013.

Buildings preceding the 21st century master plan

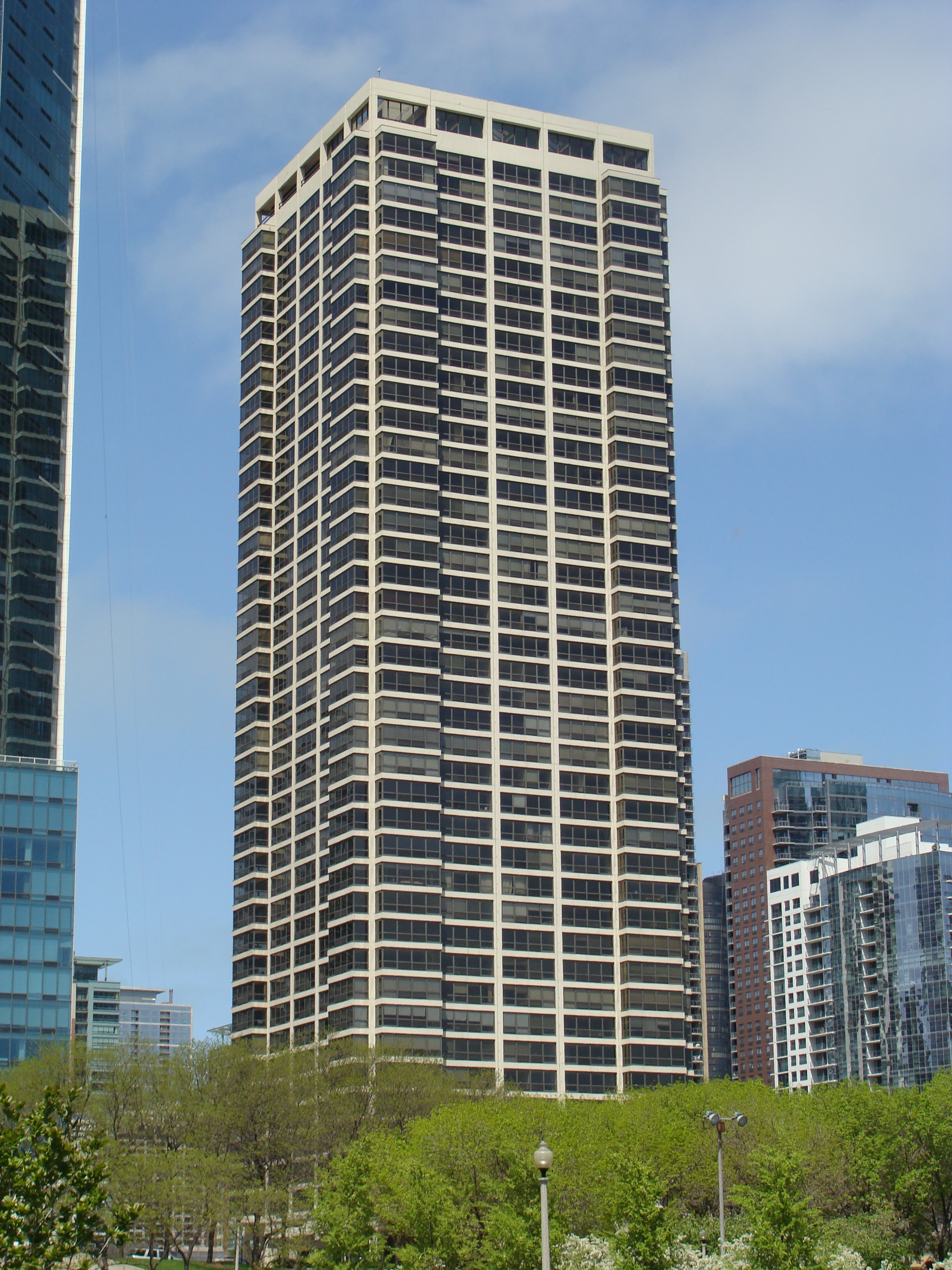
The Buckingham

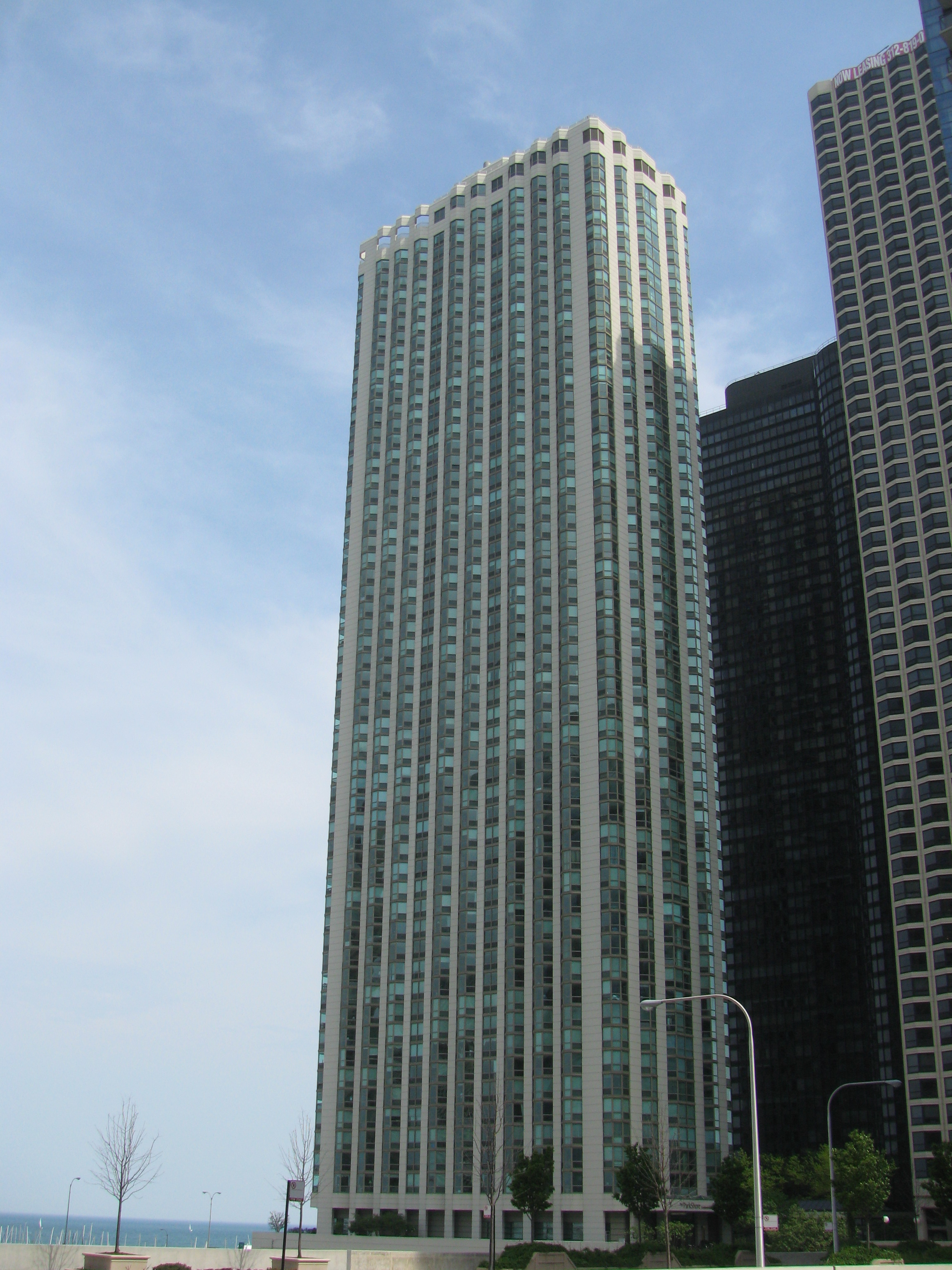
The Parkshore

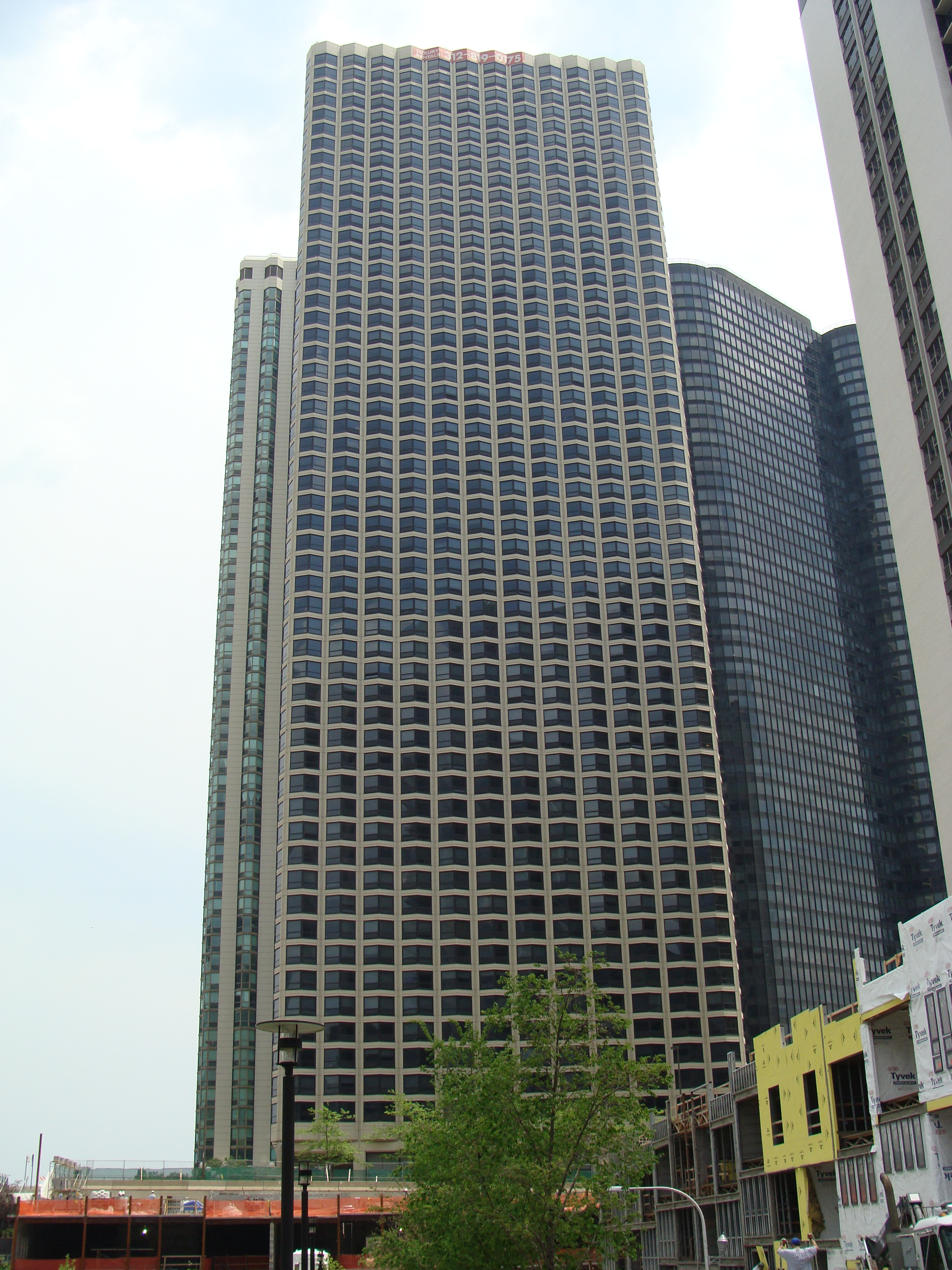
North Harbor Tower

The following buildings pre-existed the 21st century master plan for the neighborhood: Blue Cross Blue Shield Tower, Three Illinois Center, Swissôtel Chicago, Buckingham Plaza, The Parkshore, North Harbor Tower, 400 East Randolph Street Condominiums and Harbor Point. A 27-floor vertical expansion of the Blue Cross Blue Shield Tower was completed in 2010. When Harbor Point and 400 East Randolph were built, Lake Shore Drive ran through this neighborhood to the west of these buildings, but it has since been rerouted to the east of these buildings.

Buildings in the development have featured new segments of pedway. These have been integrated into the Chicago Pedway system, segments of which have formally existed since 1951. The pedway system provides connections between public and private buildings, Chicago Transit Authority stations and Metra commuter rail facilities. The pedway has generated controversy among Lakeshore East residents due to segments of promised pedway which have not been constructed. The archives available on the NewEastside.org website show numerous plans and unfulfilled promise regarding connecting the pedway to most of the New Eastside. Among developers' unfulfilled promises regarding the pedway is promises dating as far back as the 1990s that the development would feature the construction of a full pedway link to Buckingham Plaza and North Harbor Tower.

The 4, 6 and 60 CTA bus routes run along the borders of the Lakeshore East area, and the 60 makes a turnaround within it on Harbor Drive.

Recent History

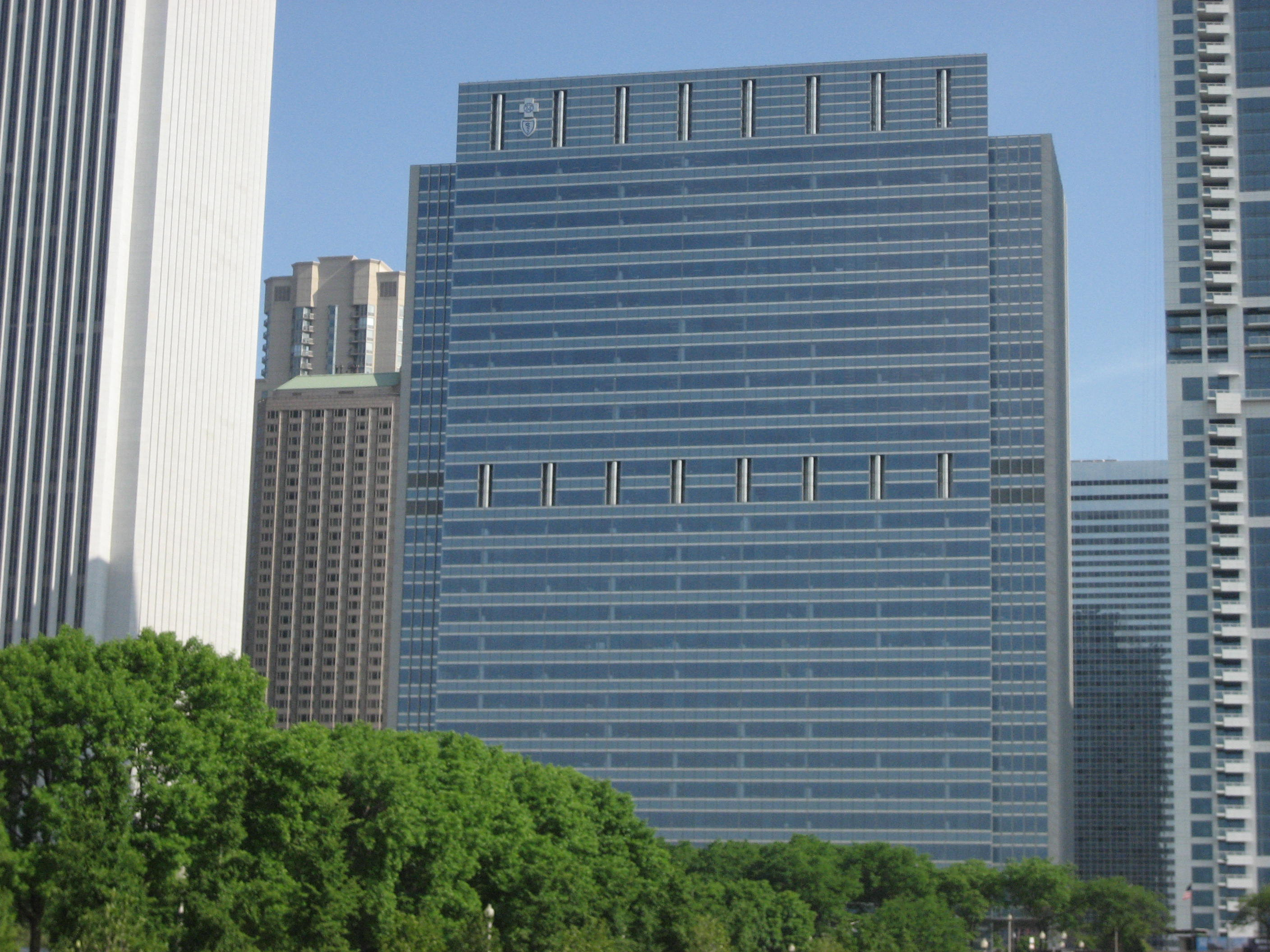
Pre-expansion Blue Cross Blue Shield Tower (June 2, 2007)

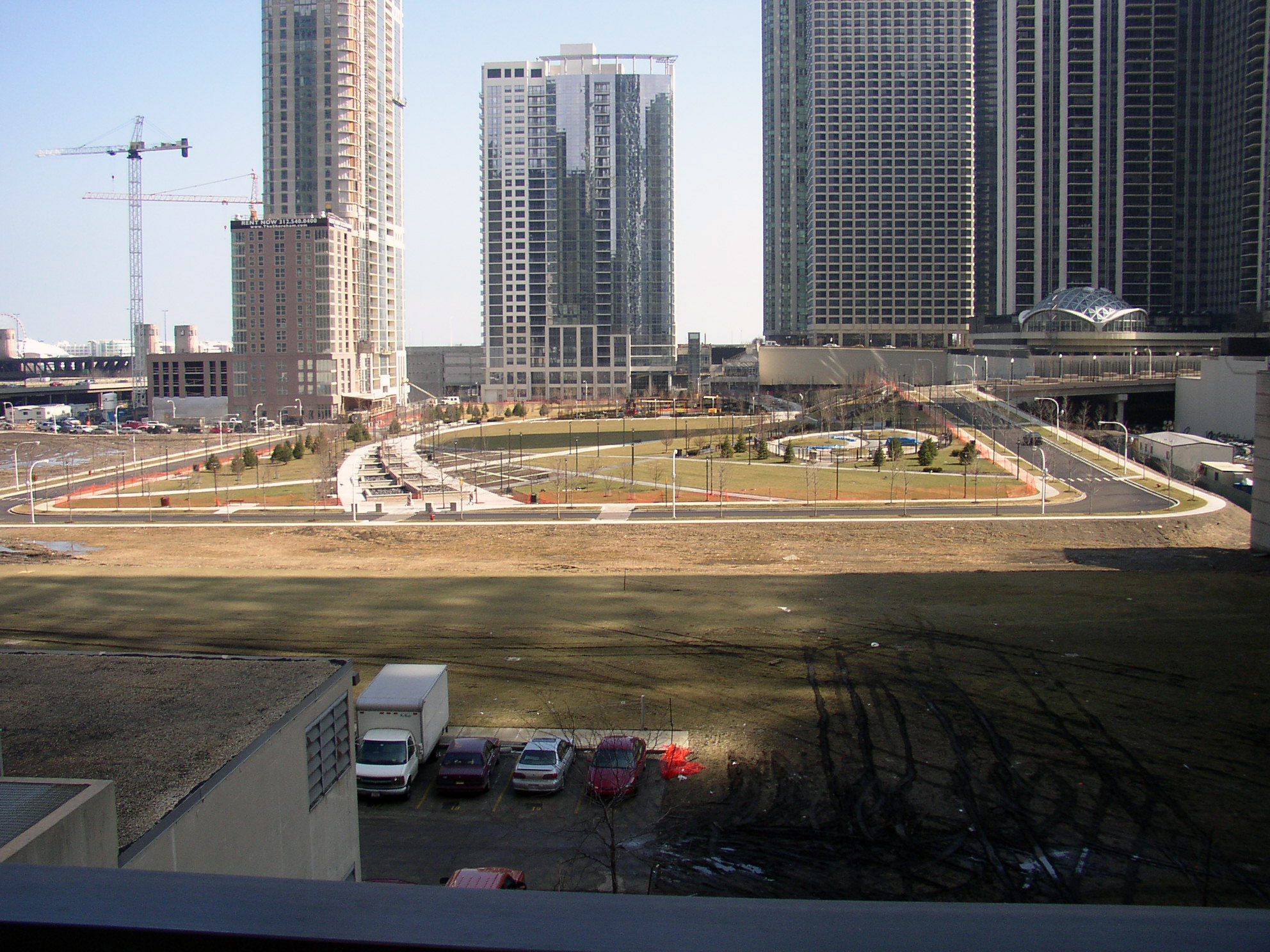
Eastward view of Lakeshore East (March 5, 2005)

== Overview ==
This $4 billion lifestyle center spans 28 acres (0.044 sq mi; 0.113 km^{2}), and will include 4,950 residences, 2,200,000 square feet (200,000 m^{2}) of gross commercial space, 1,500 hotel rooms, 770,000 square feet (72,000 m^{2}) of retail space and a planned elementary school surrounding a magnificent 6-acre (24,000 m^{2}) botanical park. The plan, which had Adrian Smith as the design partner, calls for fourteen high-rise condominiums and two commercial officespace superstructures. Lakeshore East is within walking distance to the Chicago River, Lake Michigan, DuSable Harbor, Michigan Avenue, Grant Park, and Millennium Park.

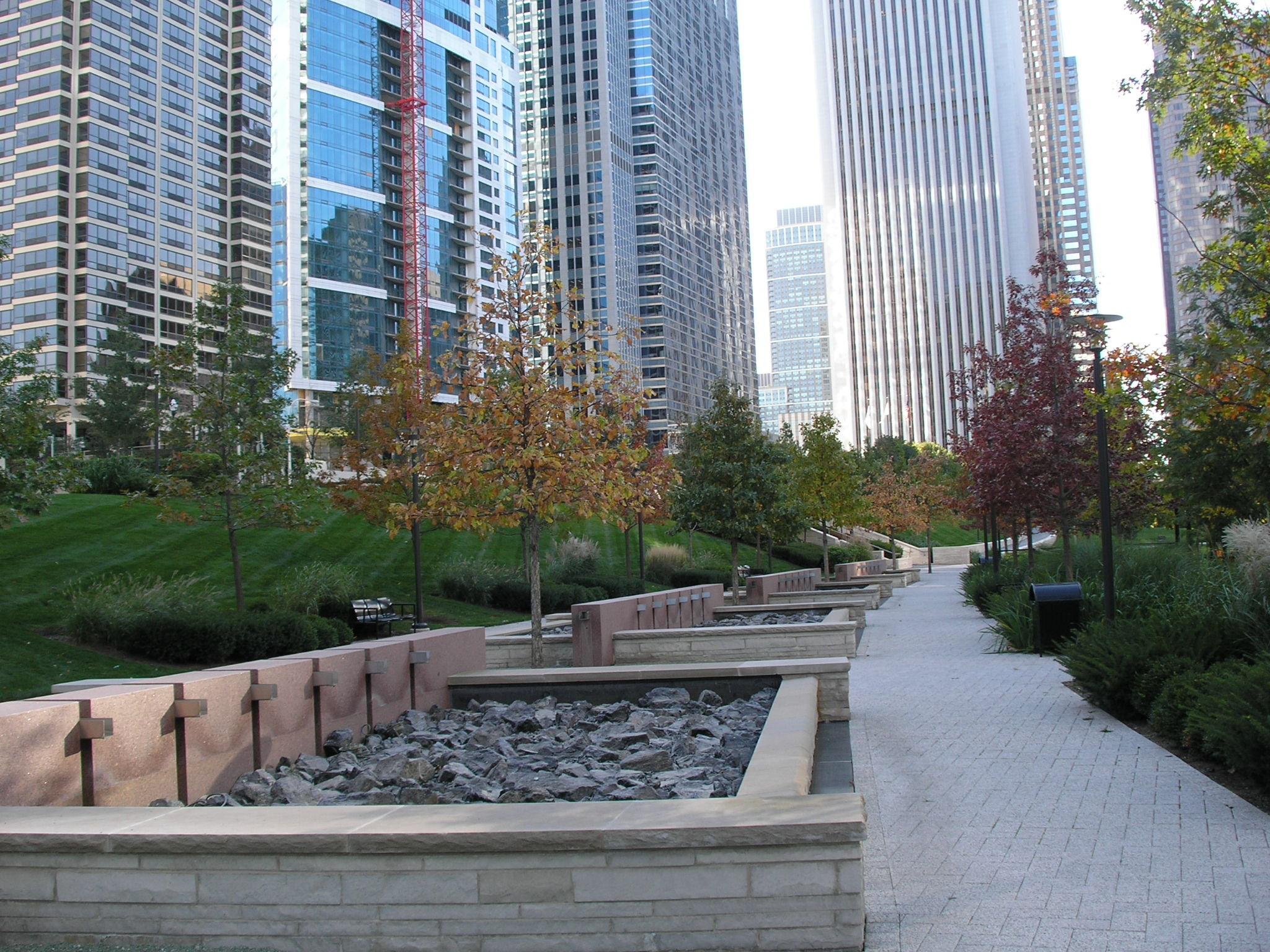
Park fountains

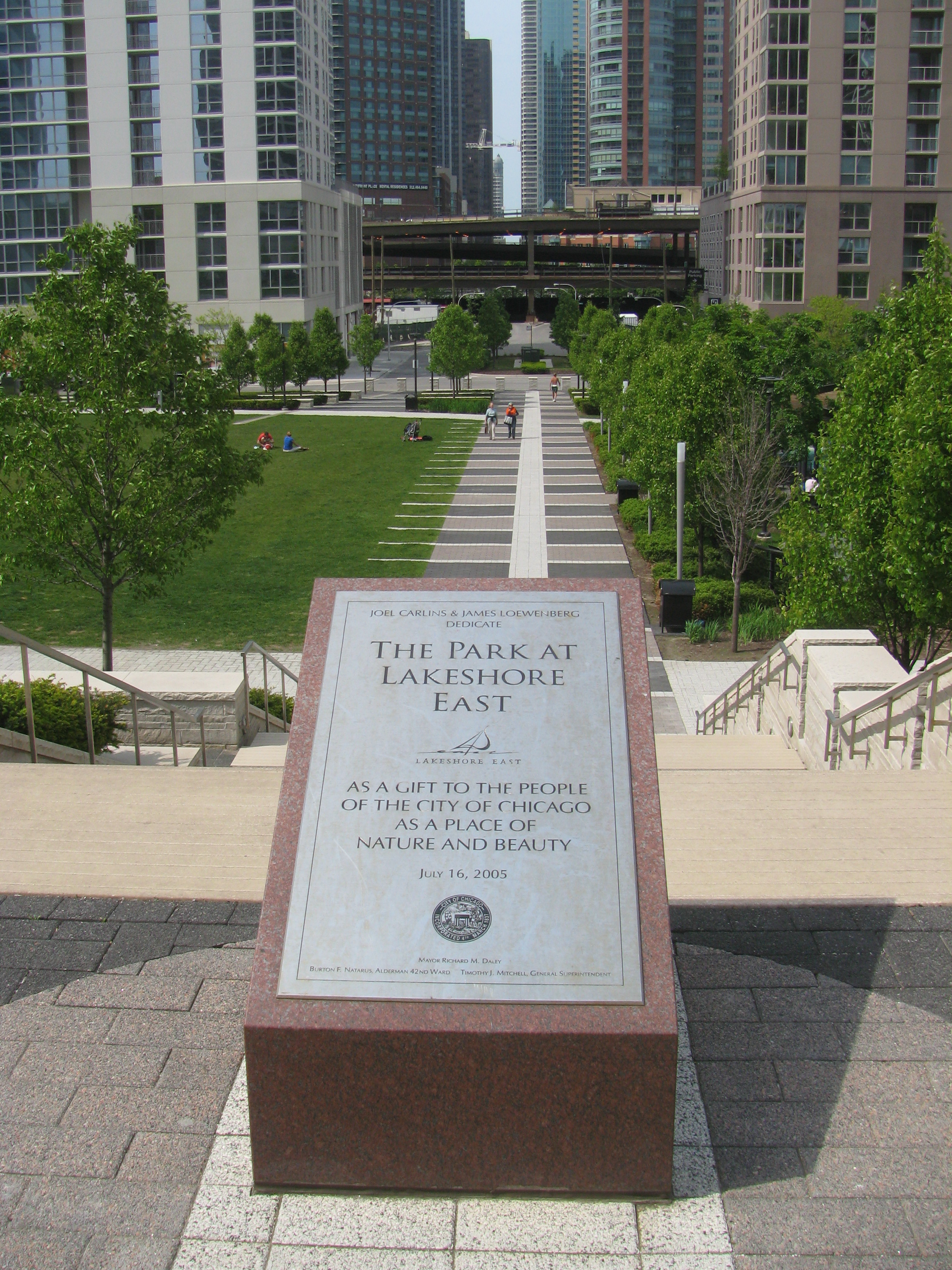
The Park at Lakeshore East Plaque

The park, named Lakeshore East Park, opened in 2005 and is supported by a mixture of public funds from the Chicago Park District and private funds from the neighboring Lakeshore East condominium buildings. It is the city's first and currently only free Wireless park. The park features several fountains. The park is dog friendly and also home to a dog park where dogs can be let off leash.

The Lancaster (completed in 2005) was Lakeshore East's first new completed building. The Shoreham (2005) was Lakeshore East's first completed apartment building. 340 on the Park (2007) was briefly the tallest all-residential building in Chicago, but was surpassed by One Museum Park. Aqua (2009) is the first skyscraper in Chicago to combine condominium residences, luxury rentals, deluxe hotel and retail spaces in the same structure and it is believed to be the tallest building in the United States designed by a female-run architectural firm. The development has its own village center, named Village Market Center, which includes a full service supermarket. The other buildings completed in the first phase of development were The Regatta (2007), The Chandler (2008) and The Tides (2008) as well as the Benton Place Parkhomes townhouses (2009).

New Lakeshore East Buildings

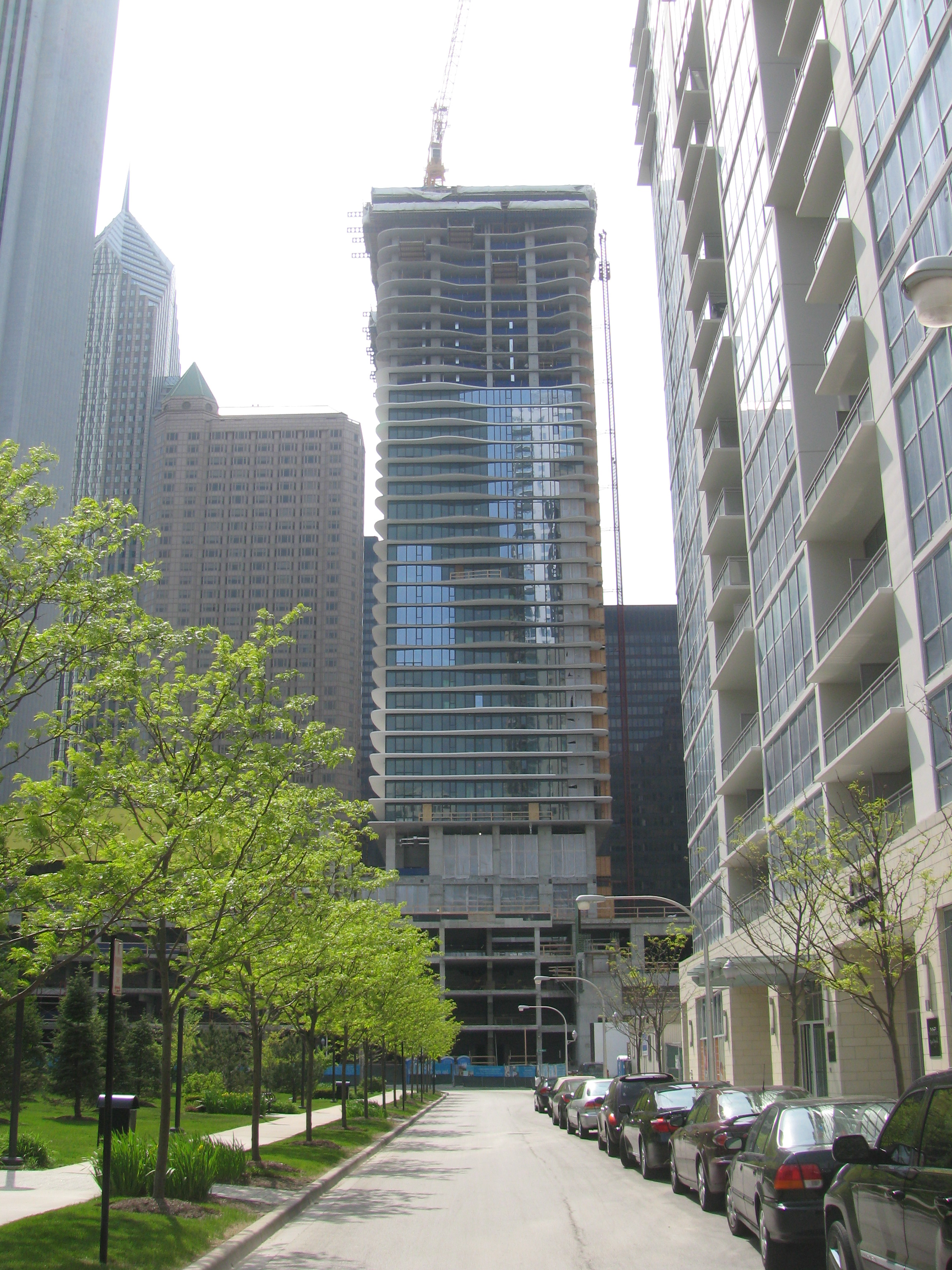
Aqua

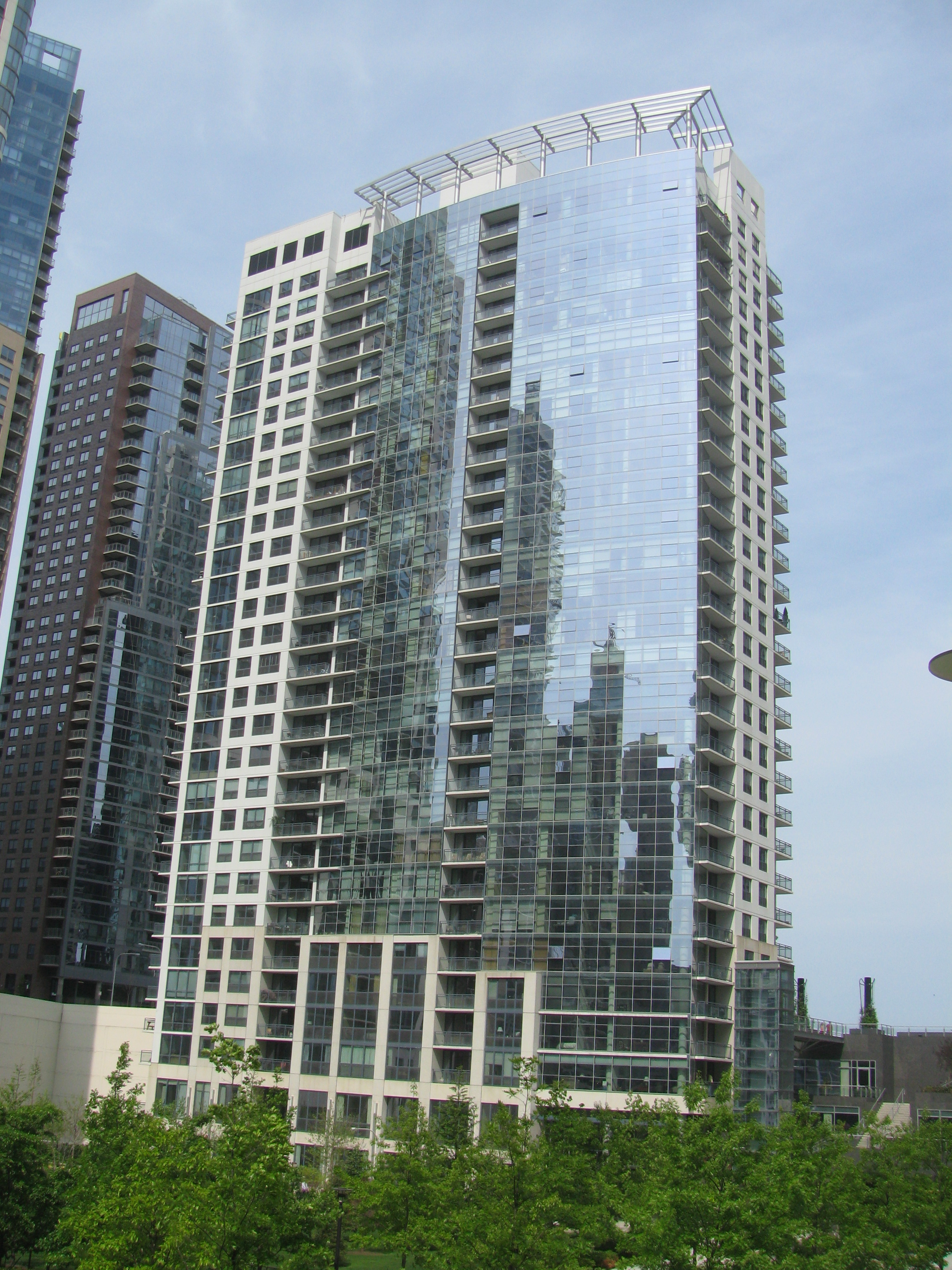
The Lancaster

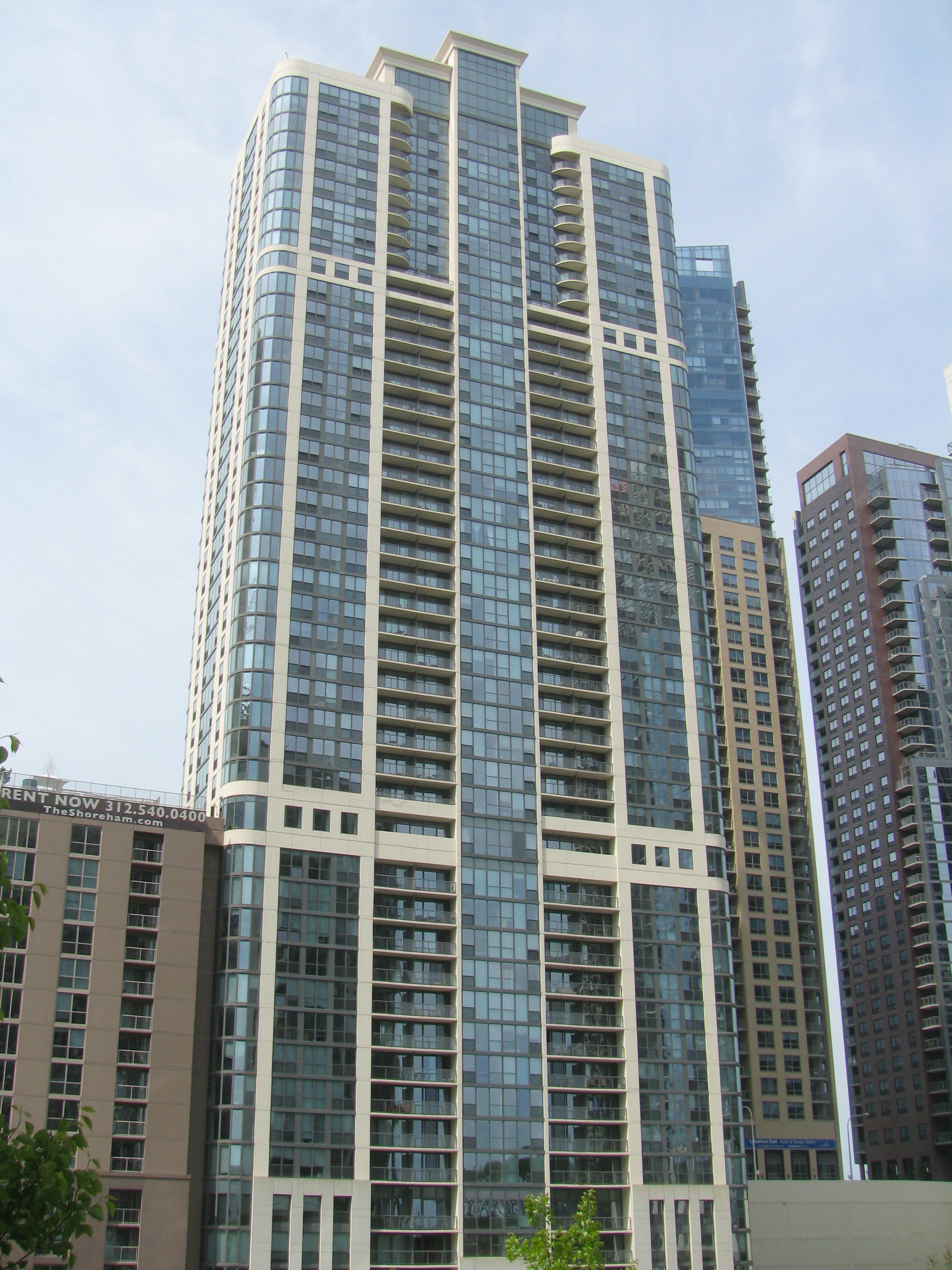
The Shoreham

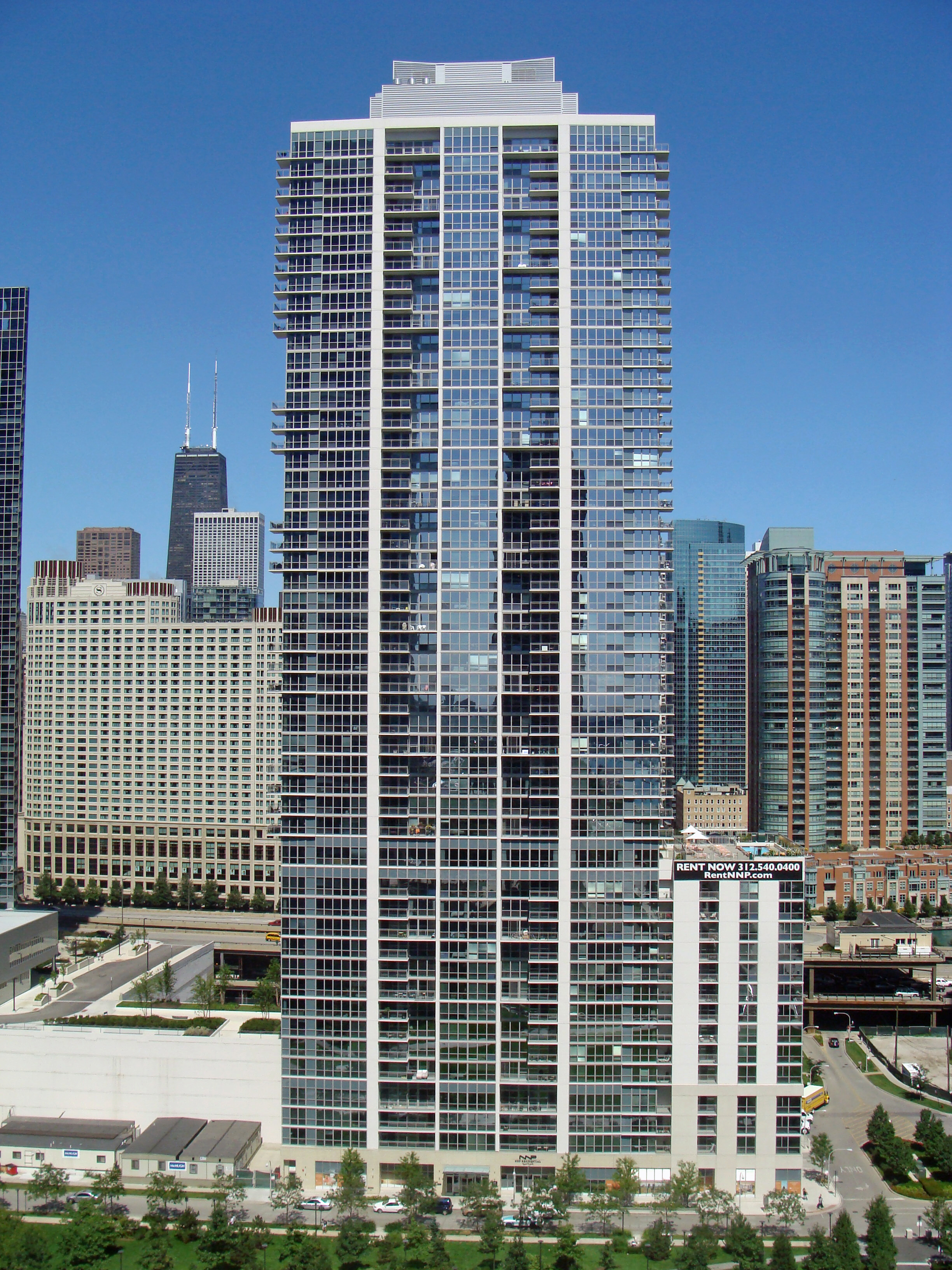
The Tides

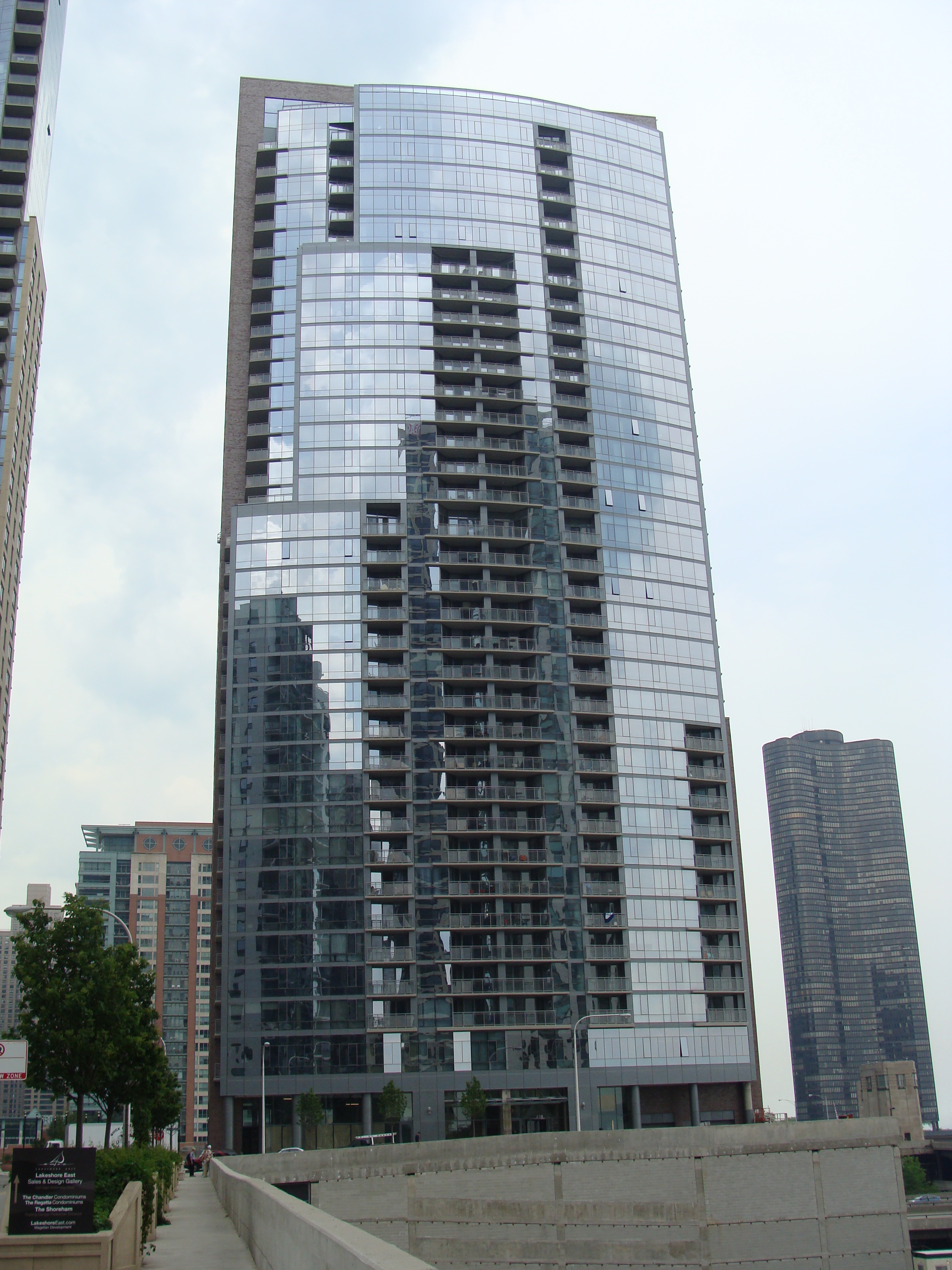
The Chandler

In 2011, construction began on Coast at Lakeshore East. Lease occupancies began in February 2013.

The St. Regis Chicago, a condominium/hotel combination that is now the third tallest building in Chicago, began construction in August 2016 and was completed in 2020.

Lakeshore East is a venture of Magellan Development Group LLC, a recently formed corporate partnership culminating a long-term collaboration between Magellan Development Group and NNP Residential & Development.

In 2017 revised plans were unveiled for remaining construction in the masterplan, but 42nd ward Alderman Brendan Reilly rejected them because of concerns about landscaping, security, minor traffic issues and building setbacks. They were revised in August 2018 to include buildings of 40, 50 and 80 storeys. The newly proposed plan would update and replace the 2001 masterplan. On mid-October 2018, the Chicago Plan Commission approved the plans that included a 950-foot (290 m) tower as one of four new towers. Chicago City Council approved the plans in an October 31 meeting.

All of the buildings in Lakeshore East are luxury condos and high-end apartment highrises. Many of them are named with an aquatic theme. In addition to the luxury skyscrapers, the development will include 24 ultra-luxury town homes in the $2 million price range.

== Awards ==
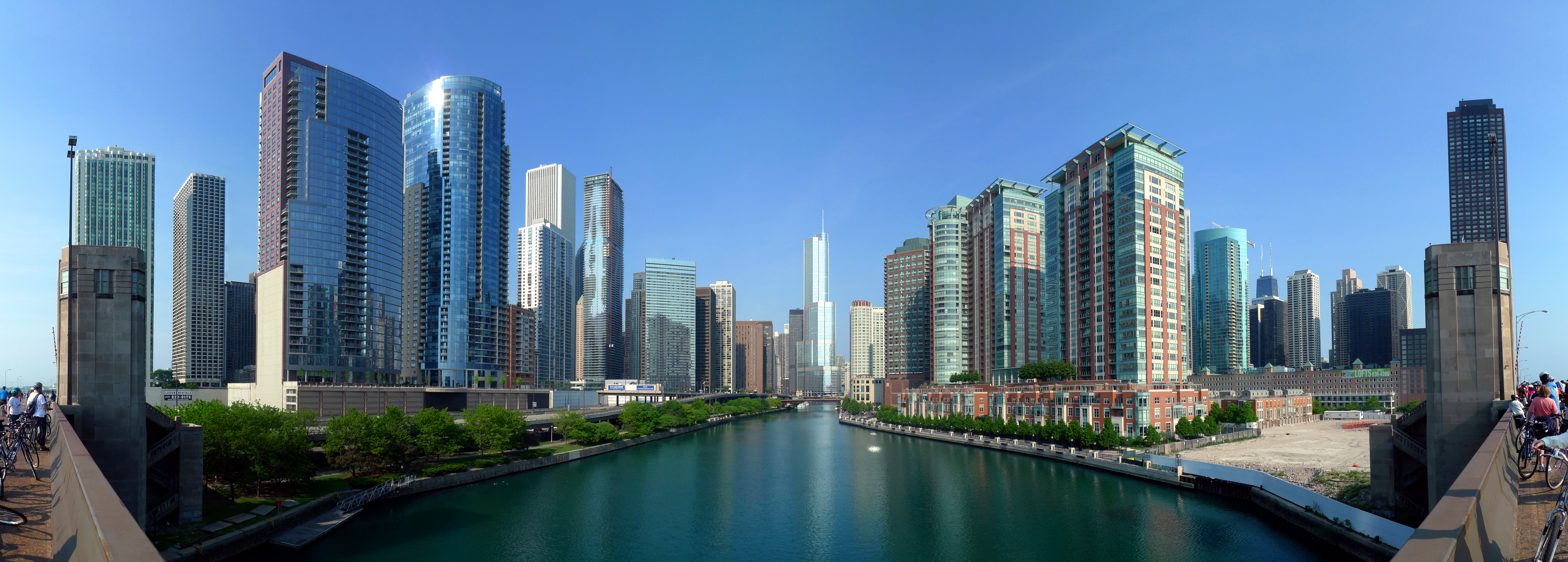
Chicago River is the south border (right) of the Near North Side and Streeterville and the north border (left) of Chicago Loop, Lakeshore East and Illinois Center (from Lake Shore Drive's Link Bridge with Trump International Hotel and Tower at jog in the river in the center) in 2009

The master plan won the 2002 American Institute of Architects National Honor Award for Regional and Urban Design. The park was honored as the Best New Park in Chicago by Chicago magazine and the city's Best New Open Space by the Friends of Downtown. The master plan, the park and several individual buildings have won numerous other awards.

In 2008, the International Real Estate Federation declared the Lakeshore East master plan the recipient of the FIABCI Prix D'Excellence international award. Lakeshore was the only United States winner for international design excellence.

== Buildings ==
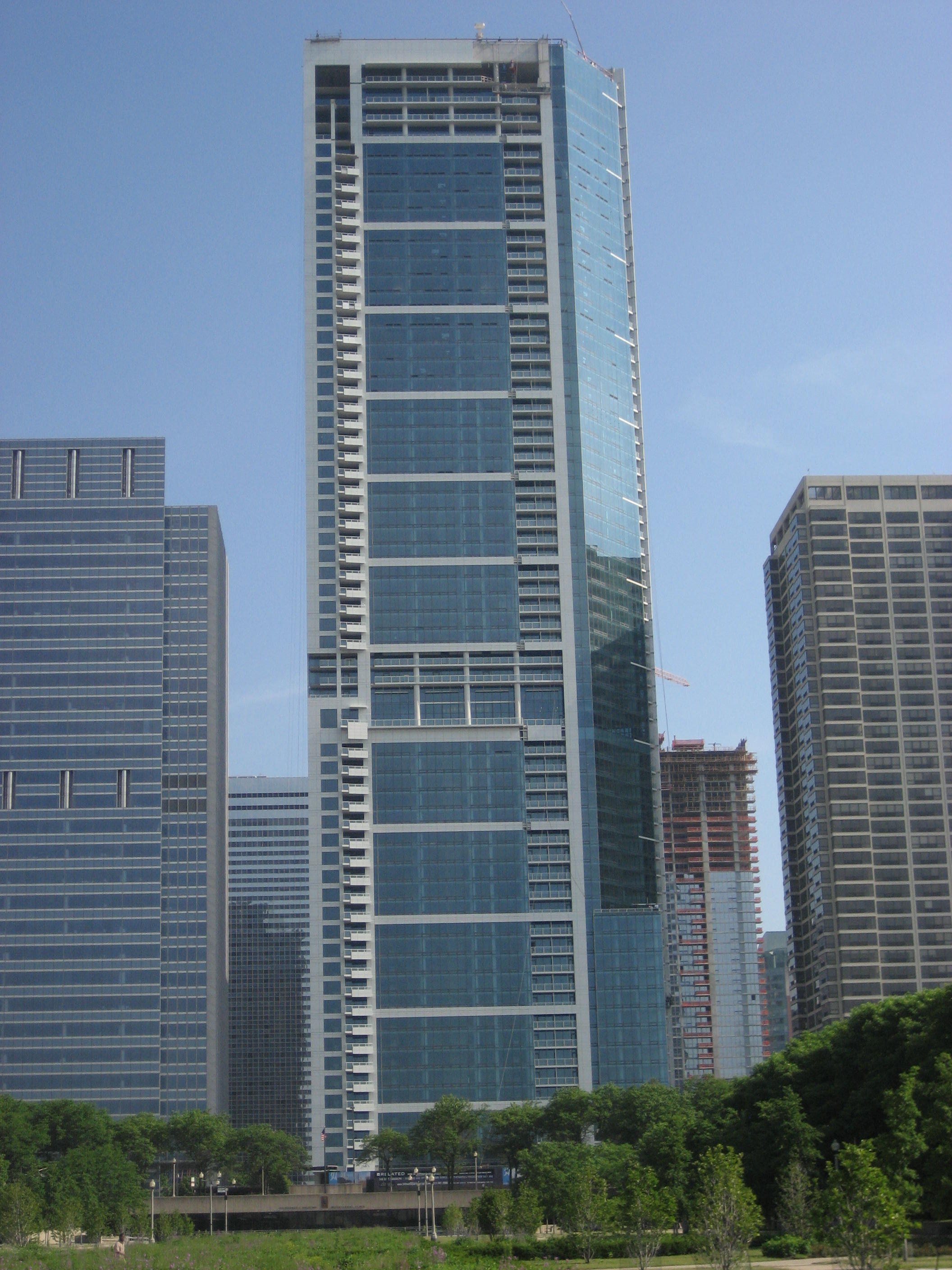
View of 340 on the Park from Grant Park on July 29, 2007

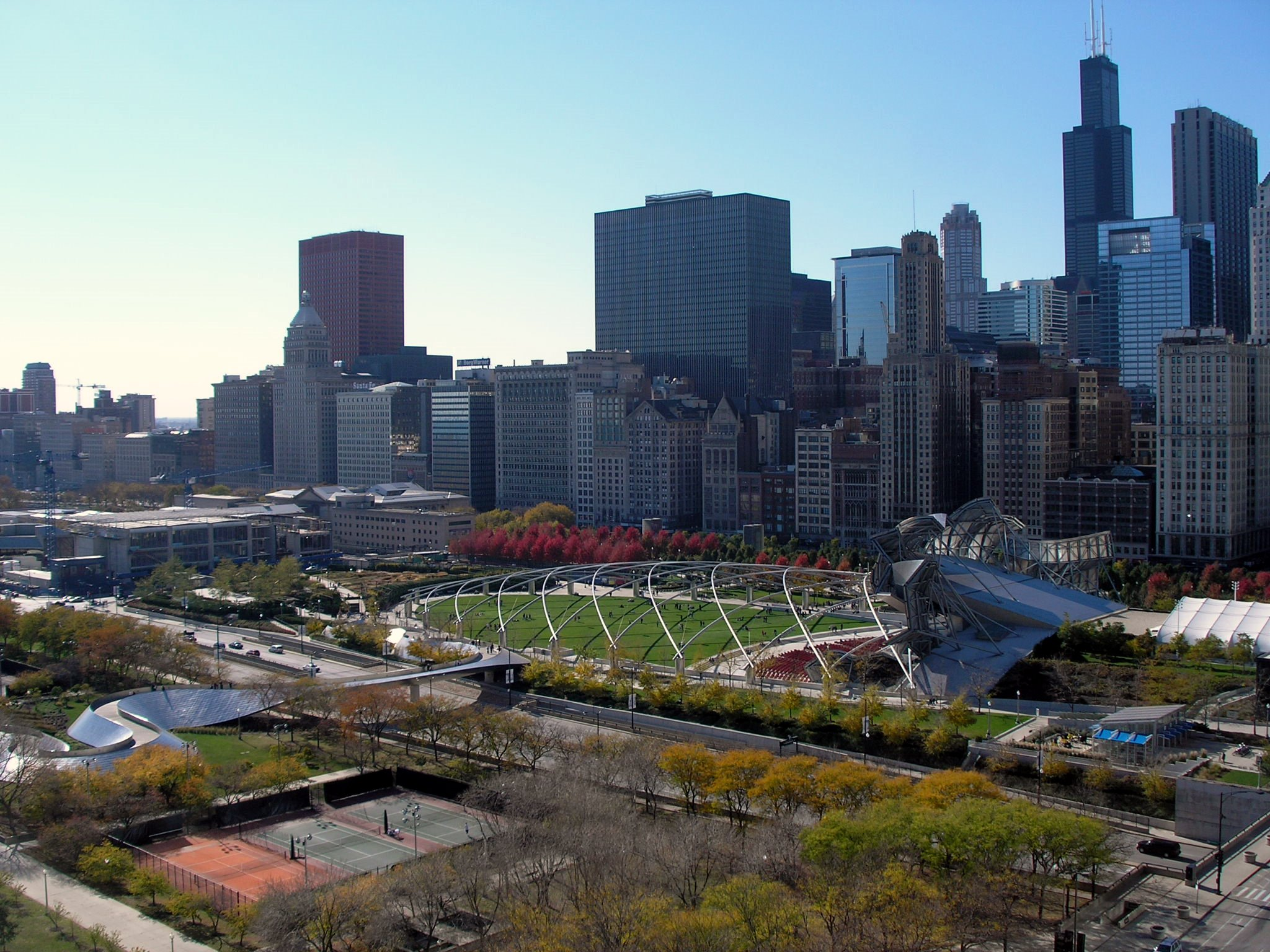
The southwest view from 340 on the Park includes Millennium Park, Art Institute of Chicago, Historic Michigan Boulevard District and Chicago Loop

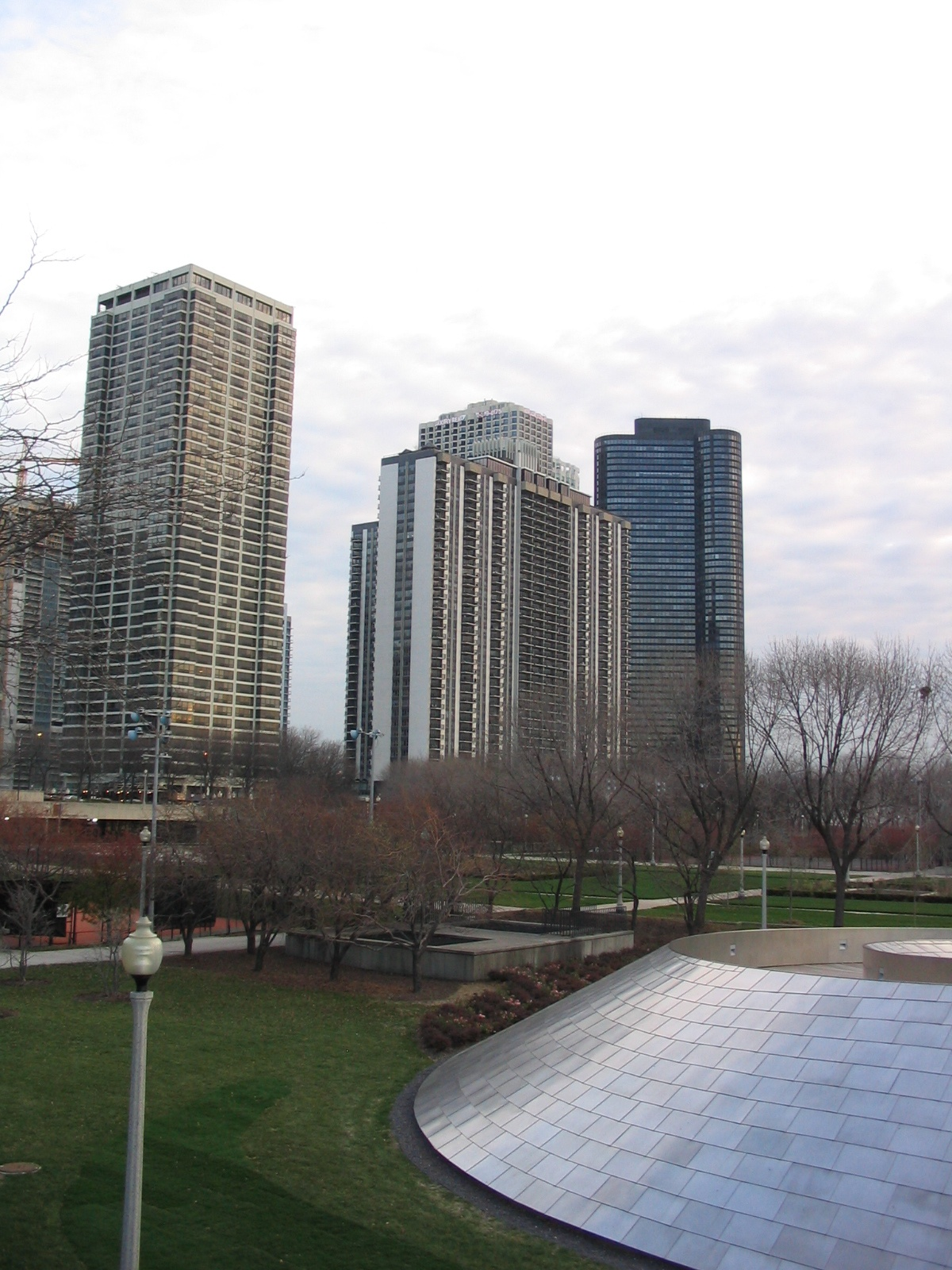
view from BP Pedestrian Bridge

Name	Address	Completed	Floors	Height ft (m)	Use
195 North Columbus	195 N. Columbus Drive	Proposed	60	650 feet (198.1 m)	TBD
340 on the Park	340 E. Randolph Street	2007	64	672 feet (204.8 m)	Condominium/Retail
400 East Randolph	400 E. Randolph Street	1963	40	378 feet (115.2 m)	Condominium
Aqua	225 N. Columbus Dr.	2009	82	822 feet (250.5 m)	Hotel/Apartment/Condominium
Blue Cross Blue Shield Tower	300 E. Randolph Street	2010	54	743 feet (226.5 m)	Office
Cascade	455 E. Waterside Drive	2021	37	396 feet (120.7 m)	Apartment
Cirrus	211 N. Harbor Drive	2021	47	512 feet (156.1 m)	Condominium
Coast at Lakeshore East	345 E. Wacker Drive	2013	45	550 feet (167.6 m)	Apartment
GEMS World Academy	350 E. South Water Street	2014	9	153 feet (46.6 m)	School
Harbor Point	155 N. Harbor Drive	1975	54	550 feet (167.6 m)	Condominium/Retail
Lakeshore East I Tower	475 E. Wacker Drive	Proposed	80	950 feet (289.6 m)	TBD
North Harbor Tower	175 N. Harbor Drive	1988	55	556 feet (169.5 m)	Apartment
Swissôtel Chicago	323 E. Wacker Drive	1989	45	457 feet (139.3 m)	Hotel
The Buckingham	360 E. Randolph Street	1982	44	400 feet (121.9 m)	Condominium
The Chandler	450 E. Waterside Drive	2008	36	389 feet (118.6 m)	Condominium
The Lancaster	201 N. Westshore Drive	2005	30	324 feet (98.8 m)	Condominium
The Parkshore	195 N. Harbor Drive	1991	56	556 feet (169.5 m)	Condominium
The Regatta	420 E. Waterside Drive	2007	45	466 feet (142.0 m)	Condominium
The Shoreham	400 E. South Water Street	2005	47	450 feet (137.2 m)	Apartment/Retail
The Tides	360 E. South Water Street	2008	51	500 feet (152.4 m)	Apartment
Three Illinois Center	303 E. Wacker Drive	1979	28	350 feet (106.7 m)	Office
St. Regis Chicago	375 E. Wacker Drive	2020	93	1,198 feet (365.2 m)	Hotel/Condominium
