= Shenzhen Tower =

Skyscraper in Shenzhen, China

- 深圳塔
- Artist's concept of the H700 Shenzhen Tower
- Alternative names: China Gate

General information
- Status: Vision
- Location: Shenzhen, Guangdong, China, Dajuyuan North Street

Height
- Antenna spire: 608 m (1,995 ft)

Technical details
- Floor count: 130

The H700 Shenzhen Tower is a visionary megatall skyscraper in Shenzhen, Guangdong, China. It is planned to be 608 metres (1,995 ft) tall with 130 floors. The tower is designed by Chicago-based company bKL Architecture.

== See also ==
- Bionic Tower
- Wuhan Greenland Center
- Qianhai Tower
- Wuhan CTF Centre
- Shanghai Tower
- Shanghai World Financial Center
- KK100
- Ping An Finance Centre
