= Coast at Lakeshore East =

Skyscraper in Chicago, Illinois

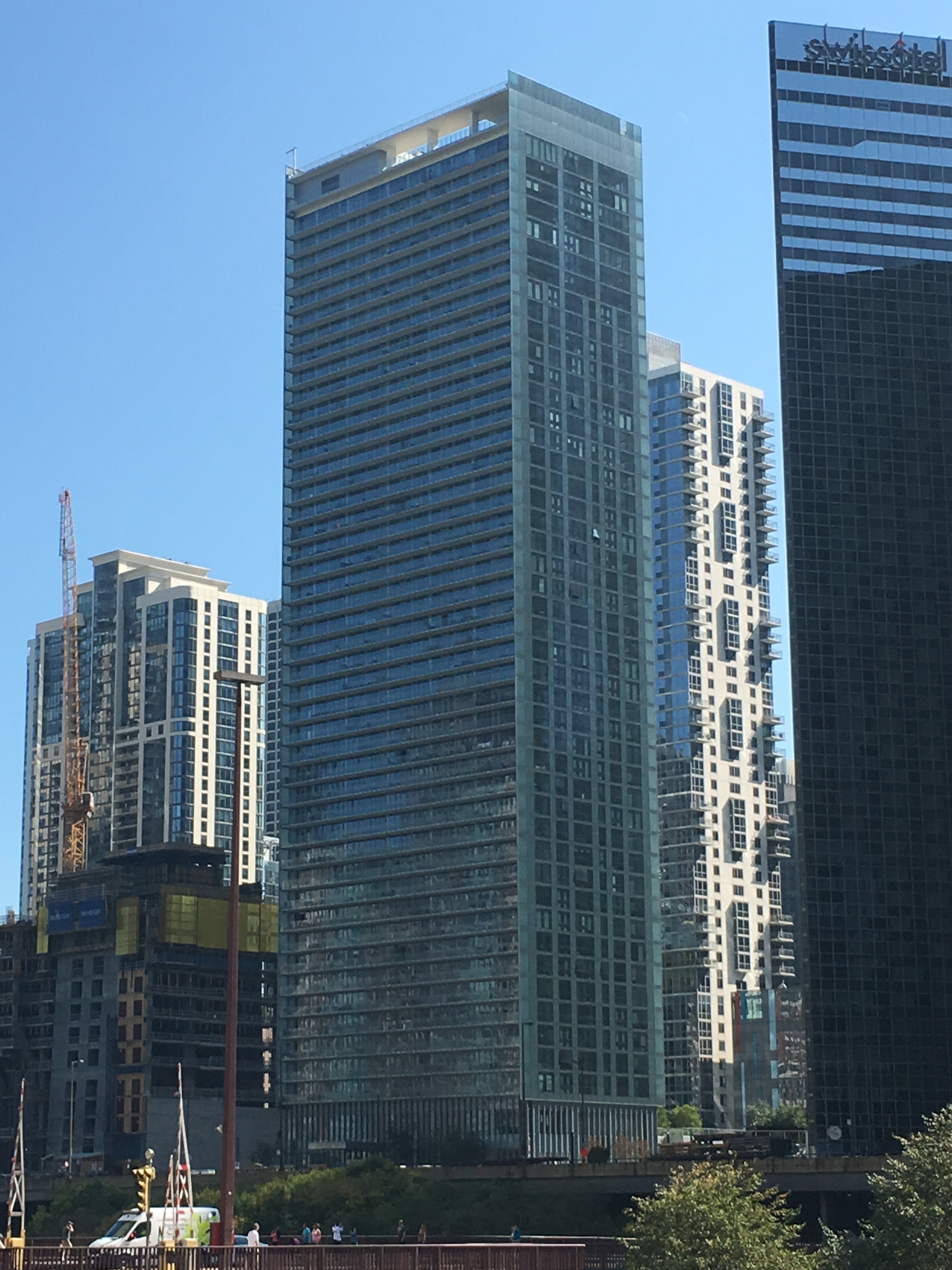
- Coast at Lakeshore East in September 2017
- Interactive map of the Coast at Lakeshore East area

General information
- Status: Completed
- Type: residential
- Location: 345 East Wacker Drive; Chicago, Illinois, USA
- Coordinates: 41°53′14″N 87°37′07″W
- Construction started: June 2011
- Completed: 2013

Height
- Roof: 463.25 ft (141.20 m)
- Top floor: 430.83 ft (131.32 m)

Technical details
- Floor count: 51
- Floor area: 682,000 sq ft (63,400 m^{2})
- Lifts/elevators: 7

Design and construction
- Architect: bKL Architecture
- Developer: Magellan Development Group
- Structural engineer: CS Associates, Inc.
- Main contractor: James McHugh Construction Co

Coast at Lakeshore East (sometimes Coast), originally known as Lakeshore East Building 2-A, is a 46-story residential skyscraper in the Lakeshore East development in the Loop community area of downtown Chicago. The building is located at 345 East Wacker Drive. It is the eighth 21st century skyscraper at Lakeshore East. It is the first smoke-free residential building in Lakeshore East.

Groundbreaking for the building occurred in June 2011 and occupancy is expected to commence in 2013. The tower is designed by the architectural firm of bKL Architecture LLC, while Magellan Development Group is the developer along with its equity partner, JPMorgan Asset Management. James McHugh Construction Co., which has constructed six buildings at Lakeshore East, is the general contractor for the new tower. Magellan was informed by the City of Chicago that it would not be granted public way permits for scaffolding during May 2012 due to the 2012 NATO Summit held in Chicago. They also spoke with the Federal Bureau of Investigation and United States Secret Service on the issue and did not apply for permits after gathering information. In November 2011, the designing architectural firm disbanded. Chicago Tribune architecture critic Blair Kamin has described the building as "a boxy, 49-story, metal-and-glass apartment tower". Coast will comprise 499 apartments, 18,000 square feet (1,700 m^{2}) retail space, a 272-car parking facility, amenities such as an outdoor pool and landscaped deck, a fitness center, resident lounge, business center, media room, and an indoor spa. As of June 2011 initial occupancy was targeted for February 2013. In February 2013, leasing offices opened for occupancy beginning in March 2013.
