= 400 East Randolph =

Condominium building in Chicago, Illinois

Outer Drive East
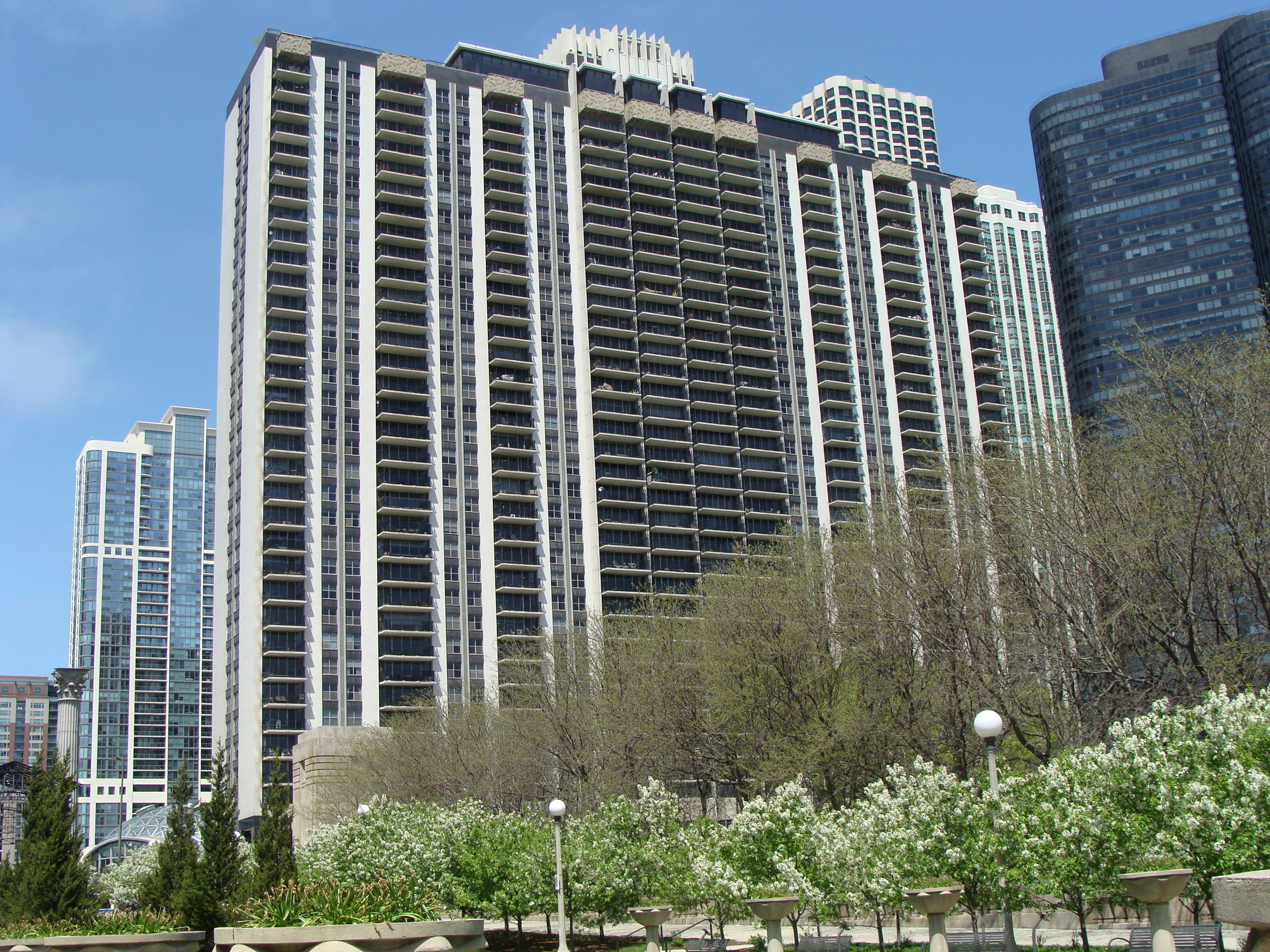
- Interactive map of the Outer Drive East area

General information
- Type: Residential condos
- Location: 400 E Randolph St. Chicago, Illinois
- Coordinates: 41°53′5.29″N 87°36′59.4″W
- Completed: 1963
- Management: The Habitat Company

Height
- Roof: 115 m (377 ft)

Technical details
- Floor count: 40

Design and construction
- Architects: Reinheimer & Associates

400 East Randolph Street Condominiums or simply 400 East Randolph (formerly Outer Drive East) is a 40-story high-rise in Chicago, Illinois, designed by Reinheimer & Associates. The building primarily consists of residential condominiums, though there are a few businesses and restaurants also located in the building. Situated on East Randolph Street on the New Eastside, the building sits between the Buckingham to its west and Harbor Point to its east. Two parks, Millennium Park and Lakeshore East Park, are immediately located to 400 East Randolph's south and north faces respectively. It is one of the buildings in the area that predates the new surrounding Lakeshore East development.

It was developed by Jerrold Wexler, who saw the legally protected lakefront as an ideal location for high income young office workers without children. In 1957, he encountered legal difficulties acquiring a lakefront site. Mayor Richard J. Daley, worried about a tendency of upscale Chicagoans to move to the suburbs, supported the project and told the planning department to make it work. The lakeshore was legally protected, but the city secured the needed legislation and resolved disputes with the Illinois Central Railroad, which originally owned the property. The city extended Randolph Drive into the lake area making the project possible. It was completed in 1962, as one of the largest apartment buildings in the world outside of New York City, with over 900 one-and two-bedroom units. It offered indoor parking, a pool and exercise facilities, a restaurant and a small grocery store. When it opened in 1962 The Chicago Sun-Times newspaper reported that Loop-area apartment towers such as Marina City, a few blocks away, "caught the city by surprise." A near-Loop location permitted one to walk to work at hundreds of office buildings, as well as walking access to the major department stores and theaters. In 1963 it became the first major apartment building in this part of downtown Chicago and started the trend of downtown living so that it is now surrounded by other upscale apartment and condominium buildings. However, after the 1970s, the amenities tended to leave the Loop and moved to North Michigan Avenue. It was converted from apartments to condominiums in 1973. Today the building houses a few businesses including the Lakefront Children's Academy.

== Position in Chicago's skyline ==
400 East Randolph (Outer Drive East) appears in front of Olympia Centre, 900 North Michigan, John Hancock Center, and Water Tower Place in the 2006 photo below.

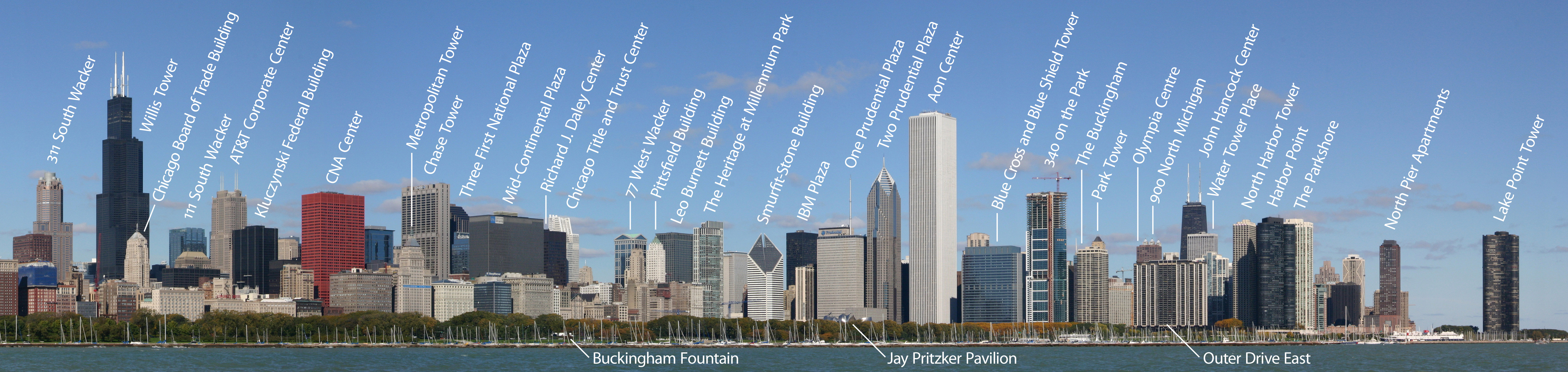
