= BKL Architecture =

bKL Architecture
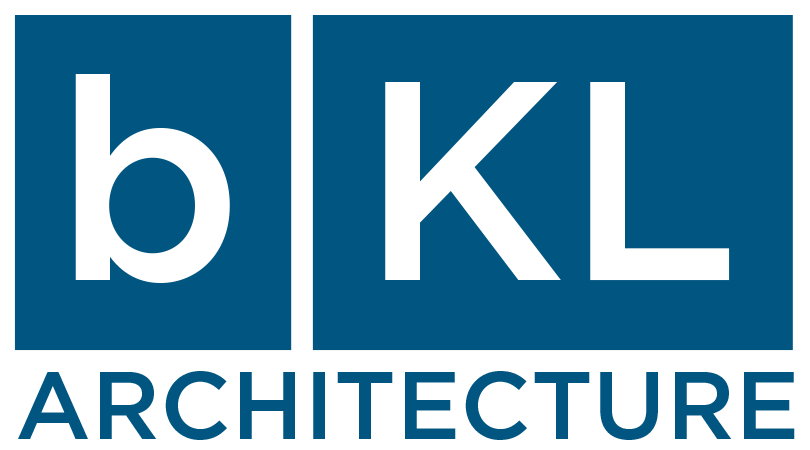

Practice information
- Key architects: Thomas Kerwin
- Founded: 2010
- Location: Chicago, Illinois, United States

Significant works and honors
- Projects: Coast at Lakeshore East; GEMS World Academy-Chicago

Website
- www.bklarchitecture.com

bKL Architecture is an architecture practice in Chicago, Illinois, United States, founded in 2010 by Thomas Kerwin with the support of James Loewenberg. Practicing primarily in the United States and China, the office has locations in Chicago, Atlanta, Washington DC, and Shanghai, China.

== Overview ==
bKL Architecture has completed numerous projects in Chicago, including the award-winning GEMS Lower School, a 10-story, 83,000-square-foot flagship school. Additionally, the firm has completed the award-winning residential high-rise tower, Coast at Lakeshore East, a 515-unit residential building with retail and amenity space located on Wacker Drive.

== Honors and awards ==
- Engineering News-Record Midwest Award of Merit K-12 Education, GEMS World Academy-Chicago Lower School
- International Interior Design Association (IIDA) Illinois Chapter RED Award, GEMS World Academy-Chicago Lower School
- American Institute of Architects (AIA) Chicago Firm of the Year Award 2020

== Selected projects ==
=== Residential ===
- Coast at Lakeshore East, Chicago, Illinois, completed 2013.
  - The building is known for its minimal glass exterior facade with continuous balconies along the north and south faces of the building. The exterior glass is composed of clear, translucent and fritted glass panels to establish an elegant facade with views towards downtown Chicago and Millennium Park.
- Wolf Point West Chicago, Chicago, Illinois, completed 2016.
  - The 510-unit residential building is a high-rise building located on Wolf Point, Chicago and is one of three proposed buildings from Pelli Clarke Pelli's masterplan. The project is a joint venture development from Magellan Development Group and Hines Interests Limited Partnership.

=== Commercial ===
- 645 West Madison, Chicago, Illinois, designed 2014.
  - The 19-story building, proposed on a site west of the Chicago Loop, features precast concrete construction that establishes a rational grid on the building facade.

=== Cultural/institutional ===
- GEMS World Academy-Chicago Lower School, Chicago, Illinois, completed 2014.
  - The GEMS Lower School, located in Chicago's Lakeshore East is a 10-story building with approximately 83,000 square feet of space. The building's vibrant facade features bold splashes of primary colors and the lively color palette continues on the interior.
