= North Harbor Tower =

Skyscraper in Chicago, Illinois

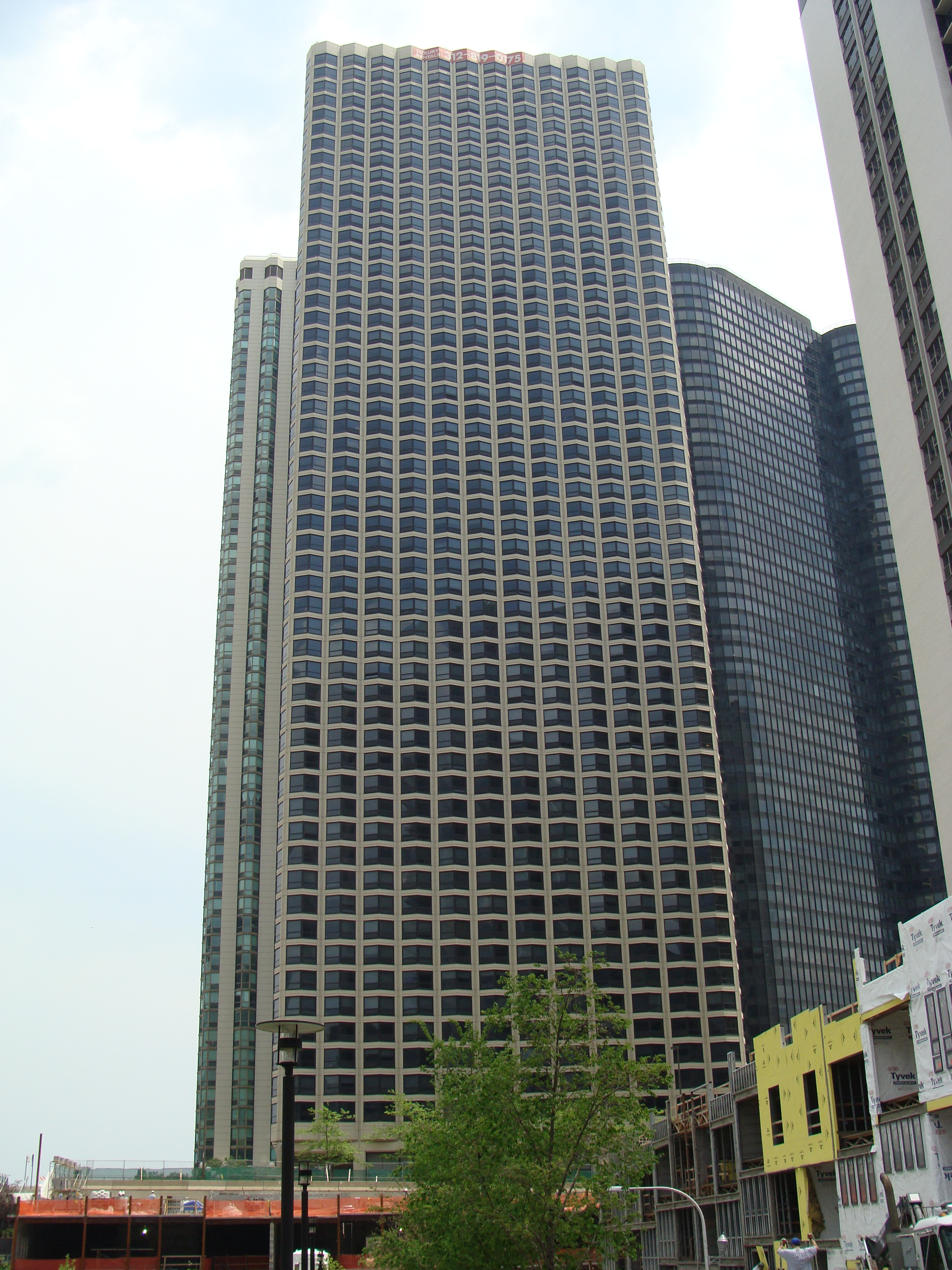
- Interactive map of the North Harbor Tower area

General information
- Status: Completed
- Type: Residential
- Location: 175 North Harbor Drive, Chicago, Illinois
- Coordinates: 41°53′07″N 87°36′56″W
- Completed: 1988
- Owner: Waterton Property Management

Height
- Roof: 556 ft (169 m)

Technical details
- Floor count: 55

Design and construction
- Architects: Fujikawa Johnson & Associates

North Harbor Tower is a 556 ft (169m) tall skyscraper in Chicago, Illinois, US. It was completed in 1988 and has 55 floors. Fujikawa Johnson & Associates designed the building, which is the 53rd tallest in Chicago. Each window in the building has a triangular projection to take advantage of skyline, park, lake, and river views. As with many apartment buildings in the area, North Harbor Tower boasts several amenities such as an indoor pool, several door attendants, a 24-hour fitness center, and an outdoor sundeck.

In January 2016, Crescent Heights agreed to purchase the 600-apartment building for an estimated $200 million.

In June 2018, Waterton Property Management & Investment Group agreed to purchase the building for an undisclosed amount.

== Position in Chicago's skyline ==
North Harbor Tower appears immediately to the left of Harbor Point in the panorama below.

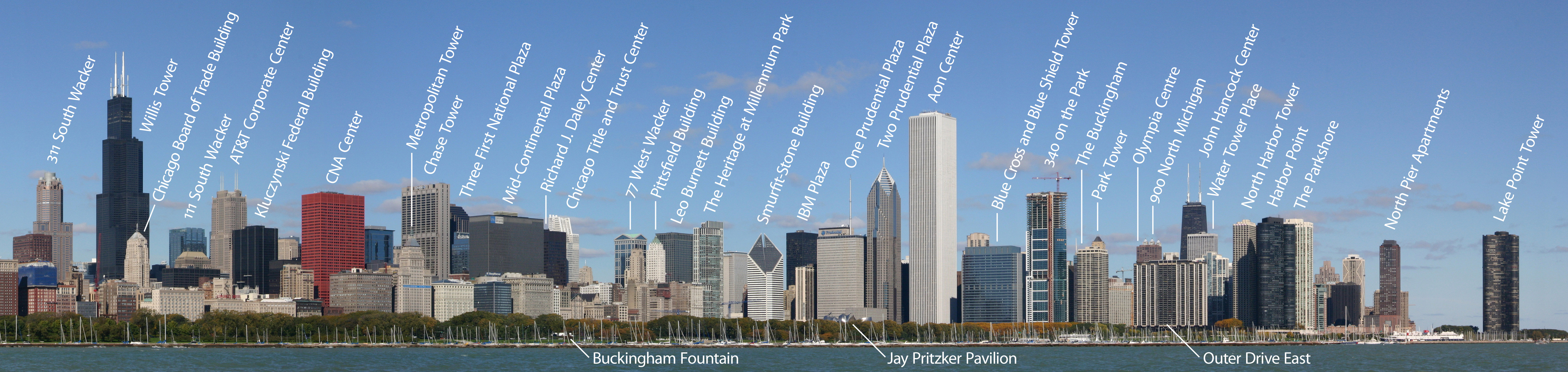

== See also ==
- List of tallest buildings in Chicago
