= Lakeshore East Building I =

Planned skyscraper in Chicago, Illinois

Coordinates: 41°53′13.6″N 87°36′52.9″W

- Alternative names: 300 North Lake Shore Drive; 475 East Wacker

General information
- Status: Approved
- Type: Mixed Use
- Estimated completion: TBD

Height
- Roof: 950 feet (290 m)

Lakeshore East Building I (also known as Lakeshore East Building 3-I or Lakeshore East Site I) is an unnamed skyscraper that is part of the 2018 revision of the Lakeshore East development masterplan. The property is located immediately south of Wacker Drive and immediately west of Lake Shore Drive with a potential address of 300 North Lake Shore Drive. The property was approved as part of the Lakeshore East masterplan with a 950-foot (290 m) height.

Illinois Central Railroad yard and old Lake Shore Drive
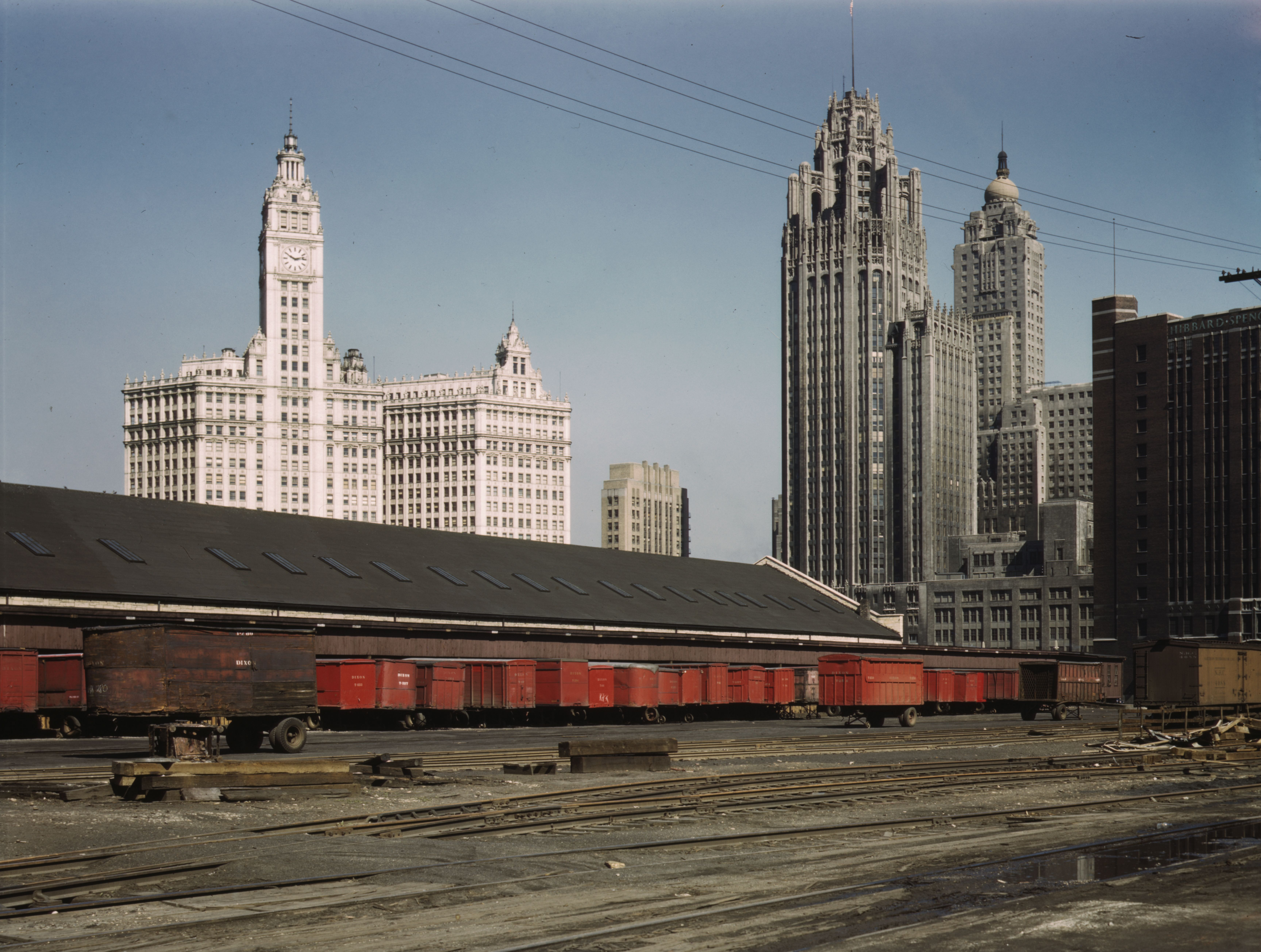
Freight terminal with 333 North Michigan Wrigley Building and Tribune Tower in the background (April 1943). Lake Shore Drive's old S-curve (1963)

Previous to this urban development, the Lakeshore East area had been used by Illinois Central Railroad yards. In 1993 under the eye of planning commissioner Valerie Jarrett, a par 3 9-hole golf course and driving range was announced for the intersection of Wacker and Lake Shore Drive as an interim development. Pete Dye designed the course, known as Metro Golf at Illinois Center, which was completed in 1994 and closed in 2001.

The area was originally planned for development as part of the Illinois Center in 1970, and one of the challenges to the new development was to integrate itself into the inherited triple-level street system while creating a visually appealing and pedestrian friendly neighborhood. The solution was to stagger ground-level amenities and building entrances from the upper level at the perimeter to the lower level at the interior. Thus the multilevel street grid is utilized around the edges, with large parking structures in the podiums, while a large park at the lowest level forms the core of the development. In 2002 the building and the whole Lakeshore East development had been scheduled for completion in 2011, and by 2008 the plan was anticipated to be completed in 2013. These plans included an 875-foot (267 m) building at Wacker and Lake Shore Drive. In 2017 revised plans were unveiled for remaining construction in the masterplan, but they were revised in August 2018 to include an 80 storey building. On mid-October 2018, the Chicago Plan Commission approved the plans that included a 950-foot (290 m) tower as one of four new towers (three in phase I). Chicago City Council approved the plans in an October 31 meeting. Two of the three phase one buildings (the 363-condo/47-story Cirrus and 503-apartment/37-story Cascade) were scheduled for simultaneous summer 2019 groundbreaking with Lakeshore East Building I to follow.

== See also ==
- List of tallest buildings in Chicago
- List of tallest buildings in the United States
