= The Buckingham (Chicago) =

Condominium building in Chicago, Illinois

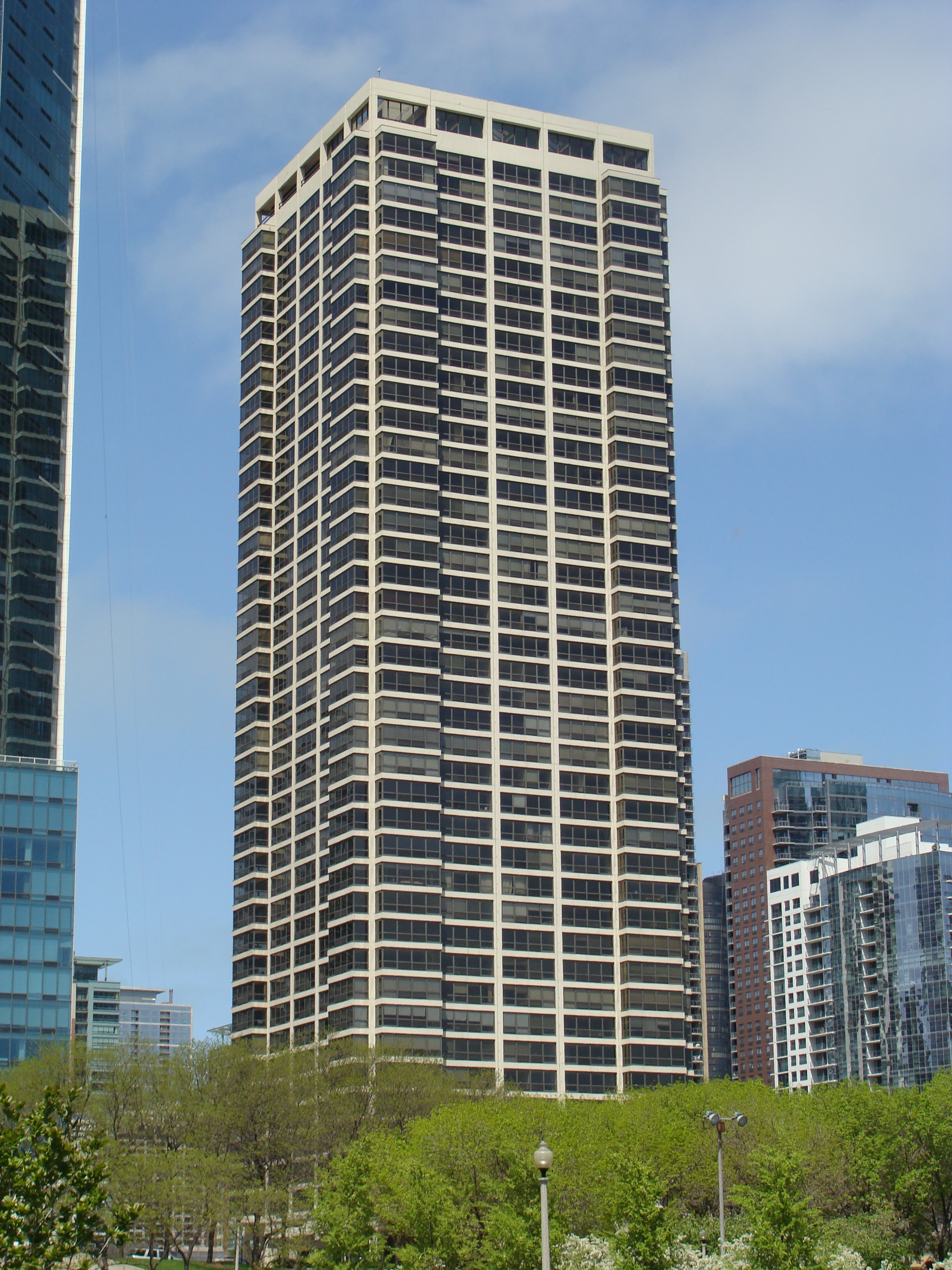
- Interactive map of the The Buckingham area

General information
- Type: Residential condos
- Location: 360 E Randolph St. Chicago, Illinois
- Coordinates: 41°53′5.38″N 87°37′4.46″W
- Completed: 1982
- Management: The Habitat Company

Height
- Roof: 122 m (400 ft)

Technical details
- Floor count: 44

Design and construction
- Architects: Fujikawa Johnson & Associates

The Buckingham, formerly known as Buckingham Plaza, is a 44-story all-residential condominium designed by Fujikawa Johnson & Associates. Located on East Randolph Street in Chicago, Illinois, the building sits between the new 340 on the Park building to its west and the older Outer Drive East building to its east. Two parks, Millennium Park and Lakeshore East Park, are immediately located to the Buckingham's south and north faces respectively. It is one of the few buildings that predates the new Lakeshore East development in the New Eastside neighborhood.

There are 7 rooms located on every residential floor of the building, for a total of 306 units. An indoor pool, sauna, laundry room, fitness center and open roof deck are located on the top floor. The Buckingham has 3 high-speed elevators that run the length of the building plus one elevator that runs from the first floor to each floor of the 4-story underground parking garage.

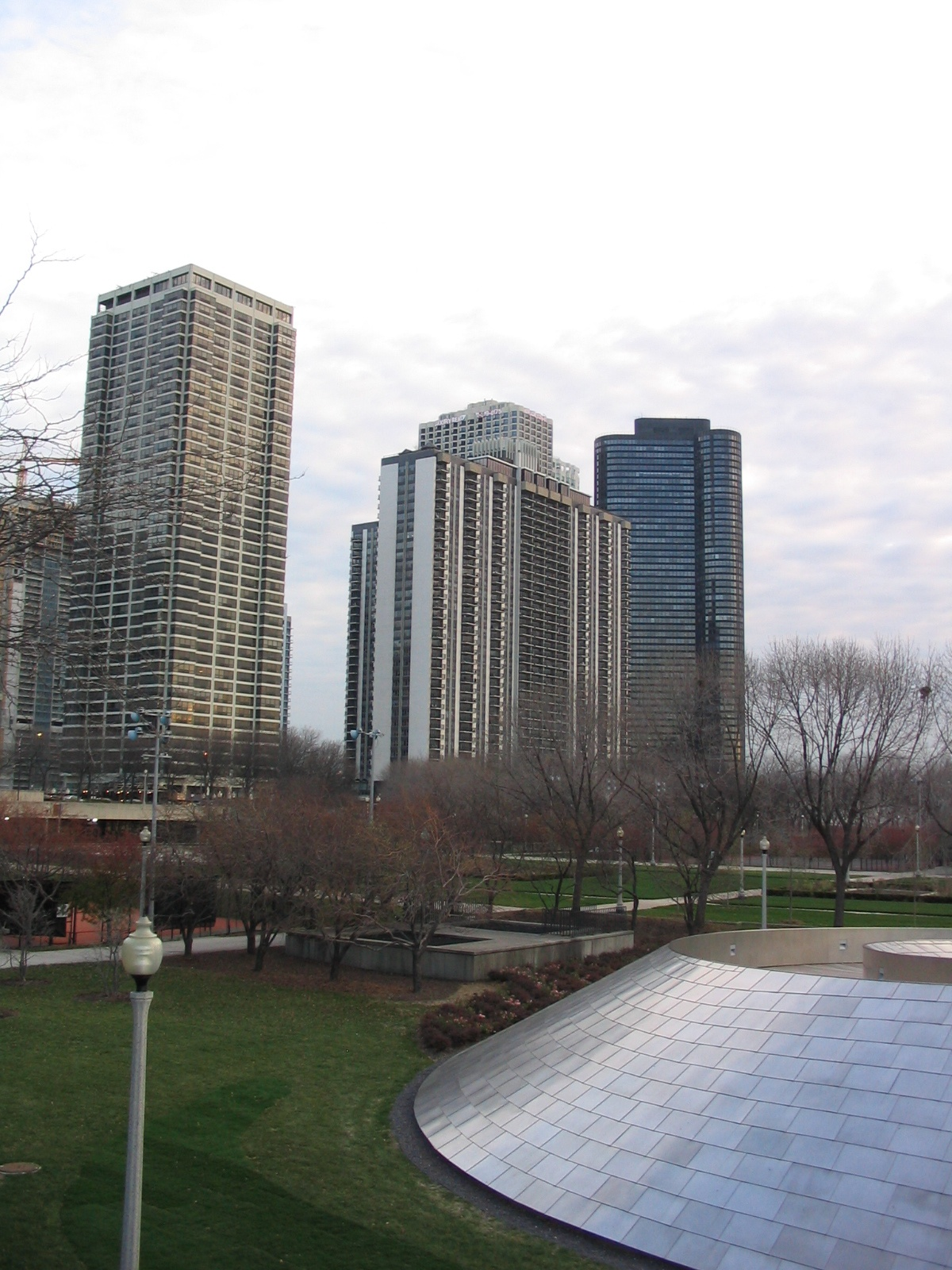
from BP Pedestrian Bridge

== Position in Chicago's skyline ==
The Buckingham is east of 340 on the Park. It appears in front of Park Tower in the diagram below.

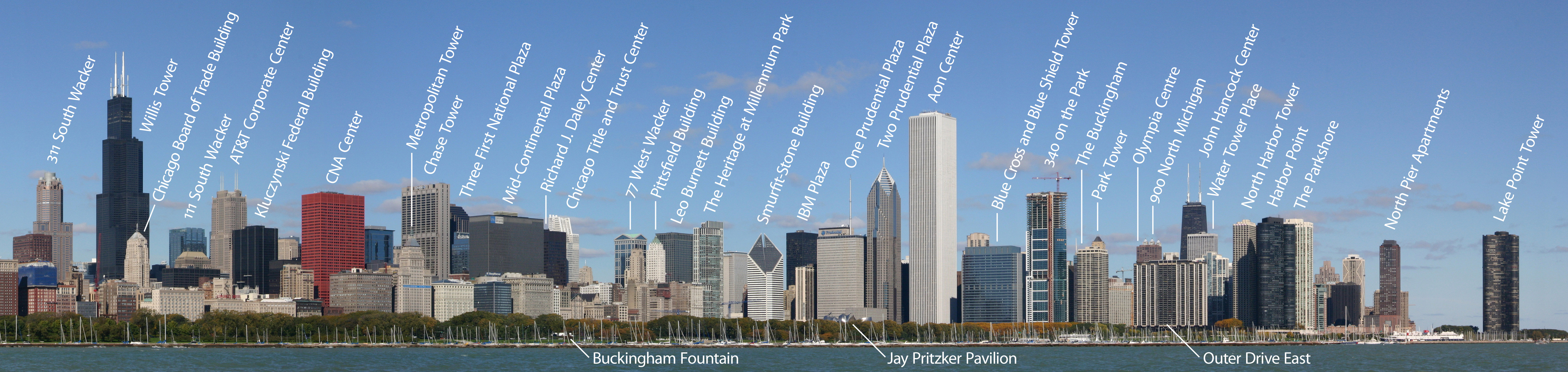
