= The Parkshore =

Skyscraper in Chicago, Illinois

The ParkShore
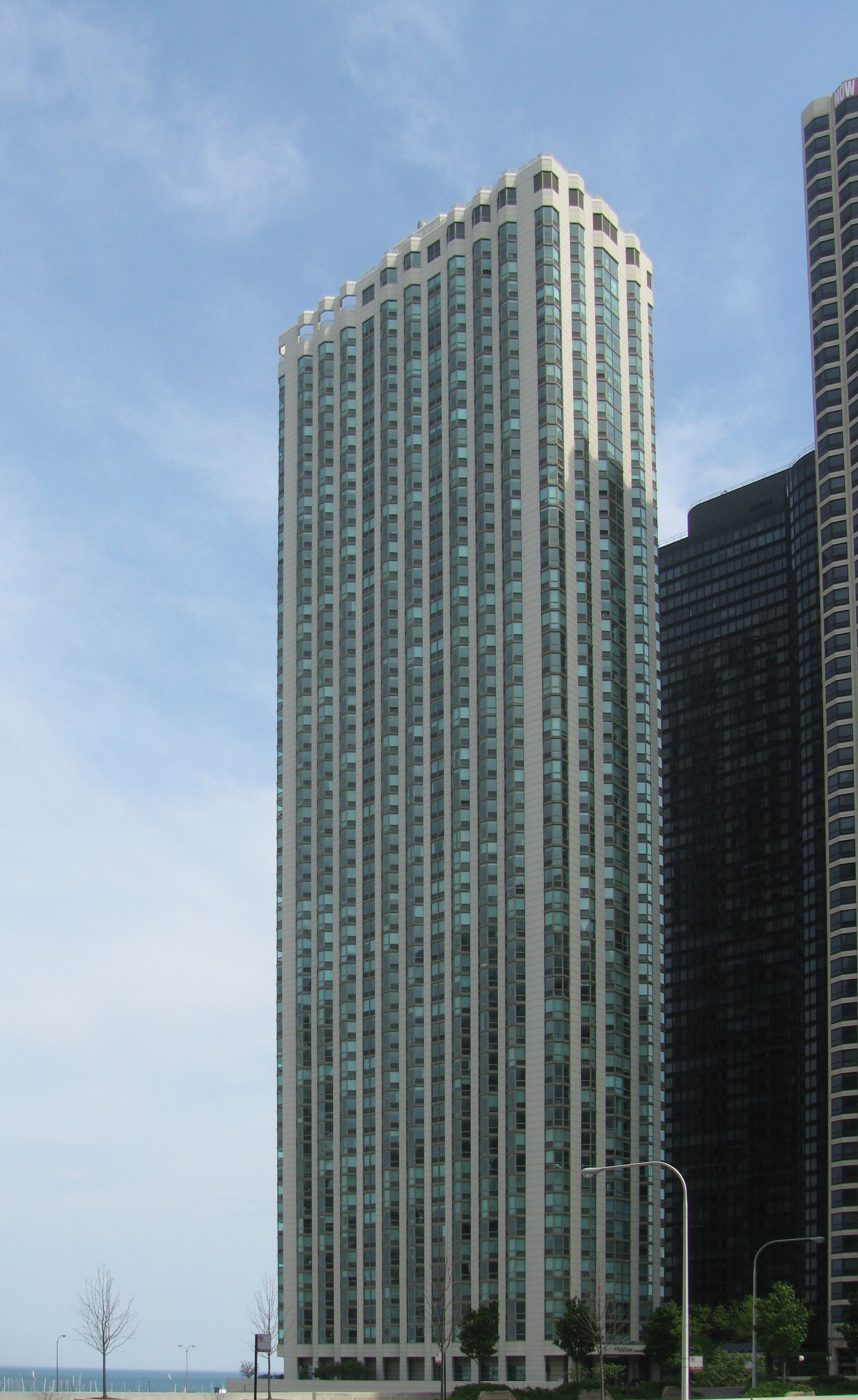
- Interactive map of the The ParkShore area

General information
- Status: Completed
- Type: Residential
- Location: 195 North Harbor Drive, Chicago, Illinois, United States
- Coordinates: 41°53′8.49″N 87°36′52.90″W
- Completed: October 1991
- Opened: April 1, 1991

Height
- Roof: 556 ft (169 m)

Technical details
- Floor count: 56
- Floor area: 945,997 sq ft (87,886.0 m^{2})

Design and construction
- Architect: Barancik Conte
- Developer: Amurcon Development
- Structural engineer: Alfred Benesch & Company
- Main contractor: Power Construction Company

Other information
- Parking: 371 spaces

The ParkShore is a 556 ft (169m) tall skyscraper in Chicago, Illinois. It was completed in 1991 and has 56 floors. Barancik Conte designed the building, which was the 34th tallest in Chicago in 1991. The pool on the 56th floor is the highest outdoor pool in Chicago.

== Position in Chicago's skyline ==
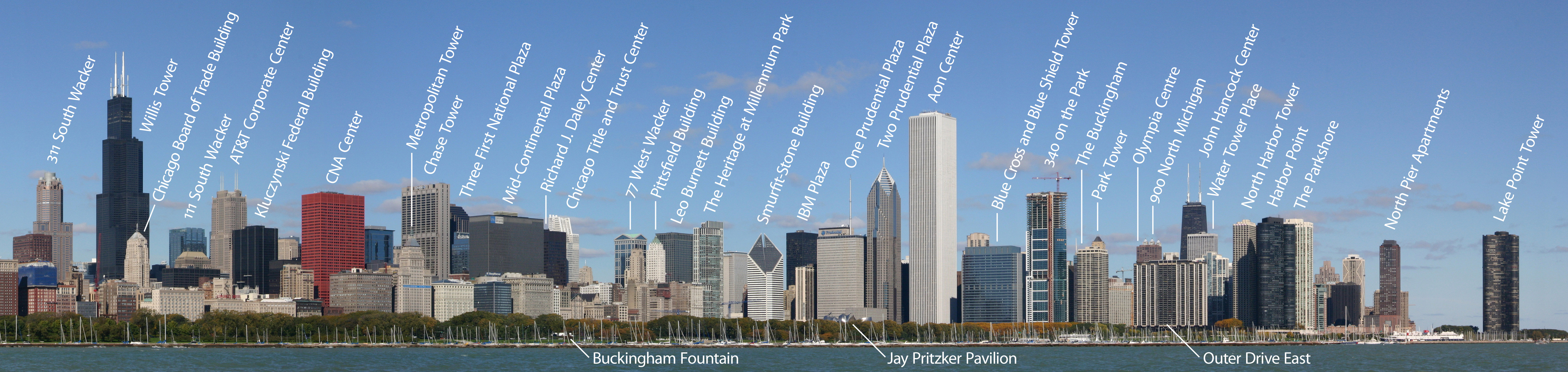

== See also ==
- List of tallest buildings in Chicago
