= Magellan Development Group =

Magellan Development Group, LLC
- Industry: real estate property development
- Founded: 1996
- Headquarters: Chicago
- Area served: United States
- Key people: Joel Carlins (Co-Founder); David Carlins(Chief Executive Officer); J.R. Berger(President)

Magellan Development Group, LLC is an American real estate and property development company that was formed in 1996 as a result of a long term corporate partnership between Joel Carlins and James Loewenberg.

The company's chief executive officer is David Carlins and J.R. Berger is the President. The affiliates of bKL Architects, Joel M. Carlins & Associates, Magellan Marketing Group, Magellan Property Management, and Magellan Realty operate autonomously within the group structure.Since its inception in 1996, Magellan has developed 28 mostly mixed-use communities encompassing over 11,000 residential units, that in aggregate have generated over$6 billion in value.

The major accomplishment of their collaboration is the $4 billion, mixed-use Lakeshore East community which reintroduced residential living to Chicago's central business district. The master plan was designed by Skidmore, Ownings, and Merrill; it consists of 28 acres (110,000 m^{2}), 4,950 new residences, 2,200,000 square feet (200,000 m^{2}) of commercial space, 1,500 hotel rooms, 770,000 square feet (72,000 m^{2}) of retail space, a planned elementary school, and a 6-acre (24,000 m^{2}) botanical park.

The company has created luxury rental and condominium communities such as Cascade, Millie on Michigan, Exhibit on Superior, Gallery on Wells, The Tides at Lakeshore East, The Shoreham at Lakeshore East, Grand Plaza, The Park Millennium, One Superior Place, and Dearborn Place. Condominium developments at Lakeshore East include the Aqua, Chicago, The St Regis Chicago, The Parkhomes, The Chandler, 340 on the Park, The Regatta, and The Lancaster. Other Lakeshore East developments include The Park at Lakeshore East and the Village Market retail center. Completed in 2022, The St Regis Chicago is Chicago's third tallest building. In addition to the Lakeshore East community, its portfolio includes buildings in Chicago's River North, Gold Coast, and Near West Side neighborhoods, such as The Park Alexandria, The Caravel, Admiral's Pointe, The Farallon, 630 North State, 21 West Chestnut, The Park Newberry Residences.

In 2012, the company expanded outside of Chicago with LPM Apartments in Minneapolis, Nashville (The SoBro) and Miami (Midtown Five), GIO in Midtown Miami and Sienna in Austin with plans for additional developments in metro Boston. In addition, the two organizations that make up Magellan Development have independently developed hotels, retail, office and medical facilities throughout the United States.

Crain's Chicago Business has named the company LLC one of Chicago's top 5 "Largest Homebuilders" in 2007 in addition to naming Magellan as number 113 in the list of "Chicago's Largest Privately Held Companies". The company has been responsible for the creation of over 12,000 residential units in Chicago and is known for its philanthropic endeavors and unique Rewards program as well as its luxury properties.
