= Harbor Point (Chicago) =

Skyscraper in Chicago, Illinois

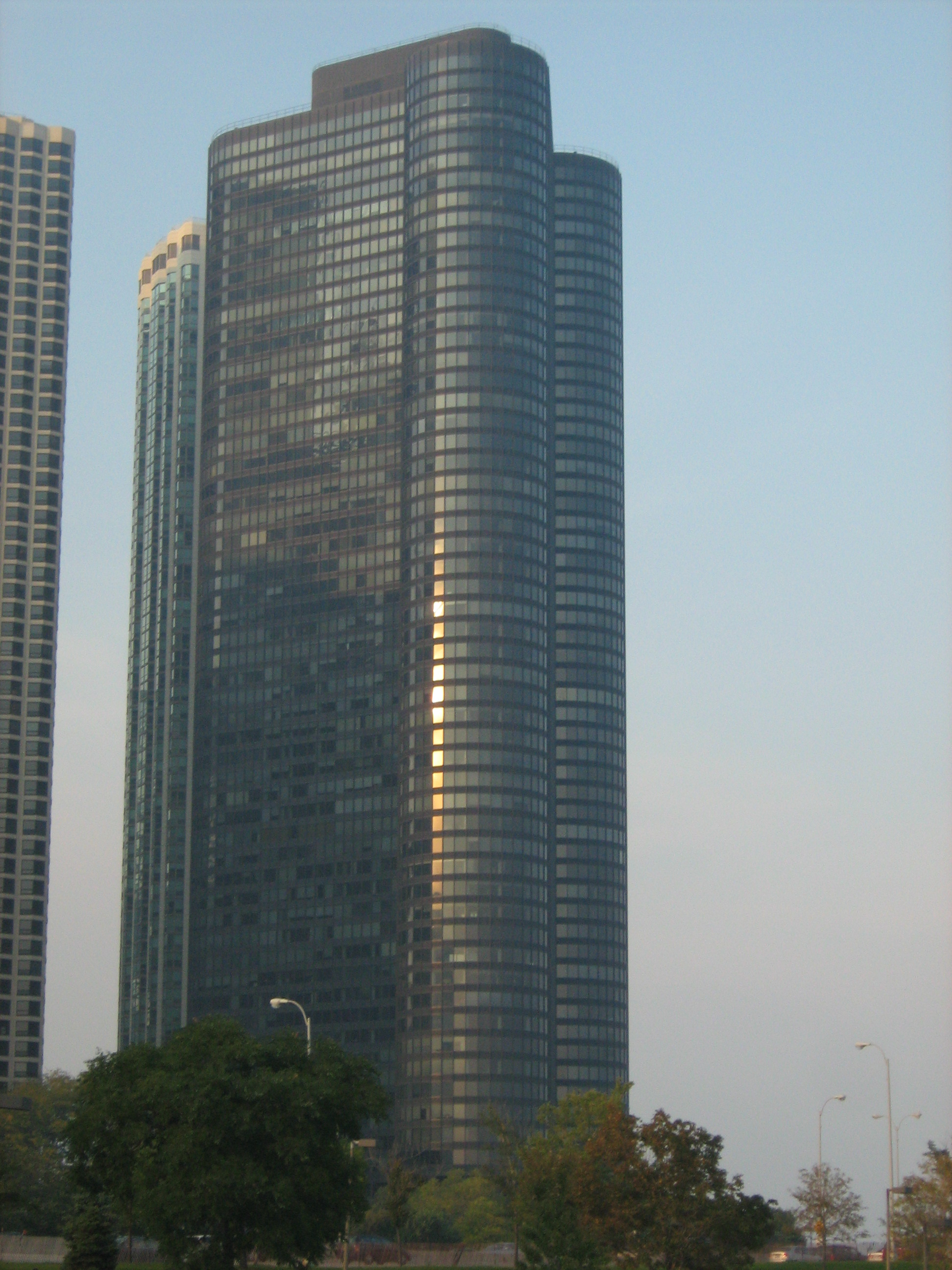
- Interactive map of the Harbor Point area

General information
- Status: Completed
- Type: Residential condominium
- Location: 155 North Harbor Drive; Chicago, Illinois; United States
- Coordinates: 41°53′5.92″N 87°36′53.39″W
- Construction started: 1972
- Completed: 1975
- Owner: Private

Height
- Antenna spire: 554 ft (169 m)

Technical details
- Floor count: 54

Design and construction
- Architects: Solomon, Cordwell, Buenz and Associates

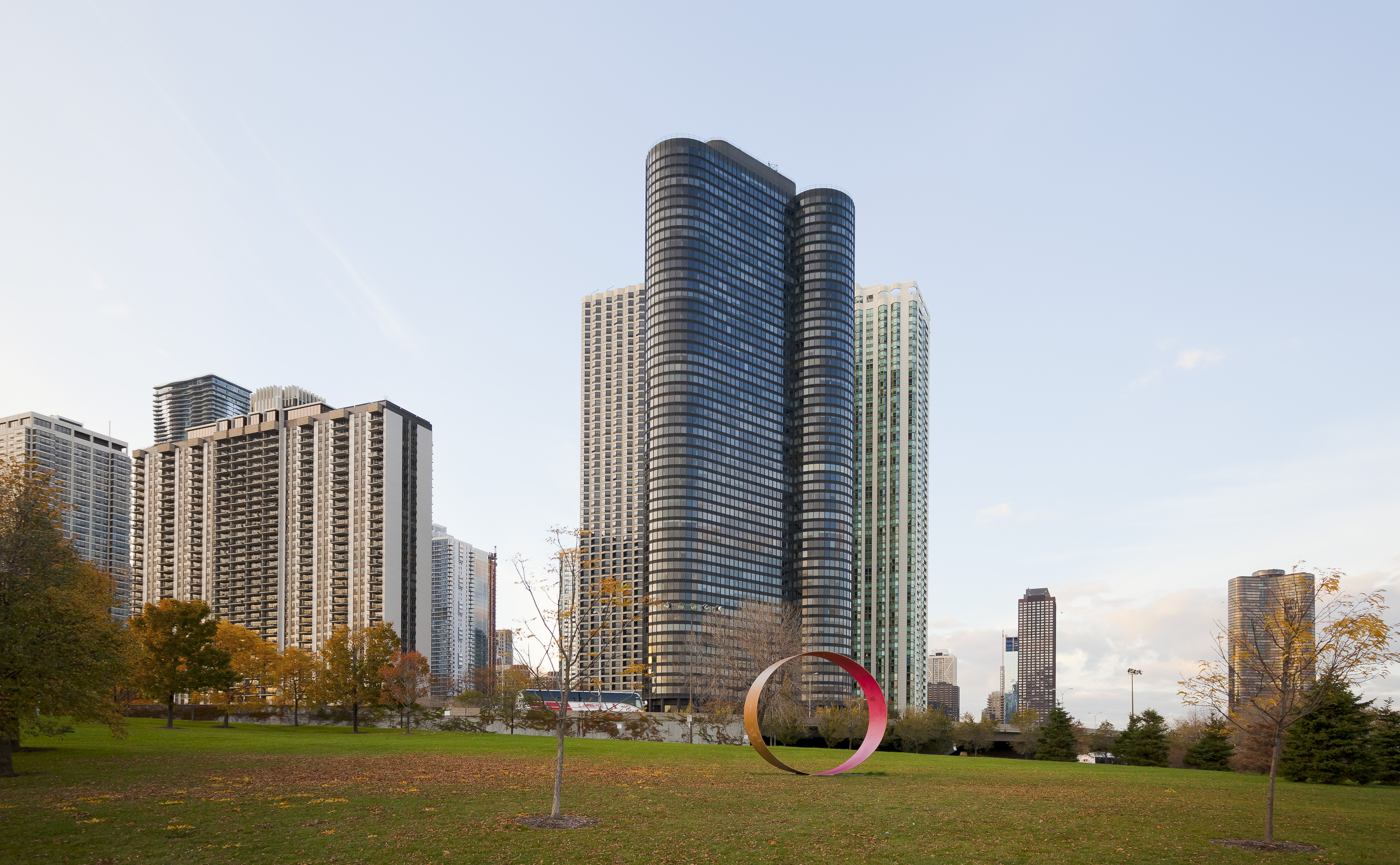
View from the harbor.

Harbor Point Condominiums is a residential and commercial building on the shoreline of Lake Michigan in Chicago, Illinois, United States. It was built in 1975.

Standing 554 feet (169 m) with 54 floors, it is among the tallest buildings in Chicago. The building has views of both Grant and Millennium Parks and sits on Chicago's Monroe Harbor.

Residents of the 742 units have access to the amenities such as an indoor pool and hot tub, outdoor sun deck, work-out facility, indoor basketball and racquetball courts, a hobby room for messy projects, a lounge with free wi-fi, an indoor children's playroom, two large hospitality rooms, private outdoor garden and park, valet parking and full-time doormen and security. The building has 22 commercial businesses, primarily located on the lower level such as a dry cleaner, grocery store, and realty agents.

According to architecture critic Blair Kamin, the building's design followed the nearby Lake Point Tower, located at 505 North Lake Shore Drive.

== See also ==
- List of tallest buildings in Chicago

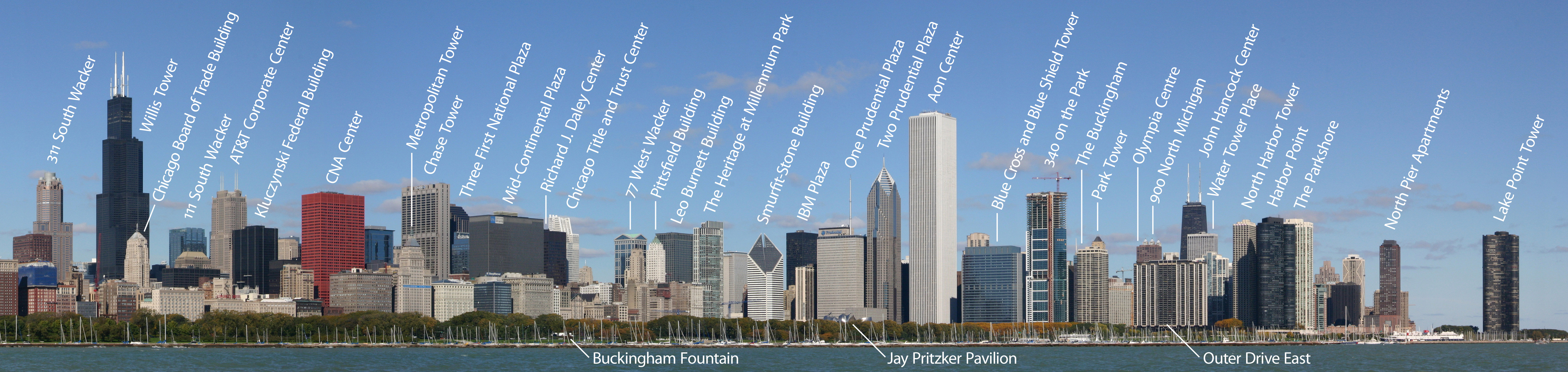
