= Congress Street Bridge =

Congress Street Bridge may refer to one of the following bridges in the United States:

- Congress Street Bridge (Boston), in Boston, Massachusetts (extant)
- Congress Street Bridge (Connecticut), in Bridgeport, Connecticut (removed)
- Congress Street Bridge (New York), in Troy, New York (extant)

== See also ==
- Congress Avenue Bridge, in Austin, Texas, U.S.
- Congress Parkway Bridge, in Chicago, Illinois, U.S.
- Congress Street (disambiguation)
