= Congress Parkway Bridge =

Bridge in Chicago, Illinois, U.S.

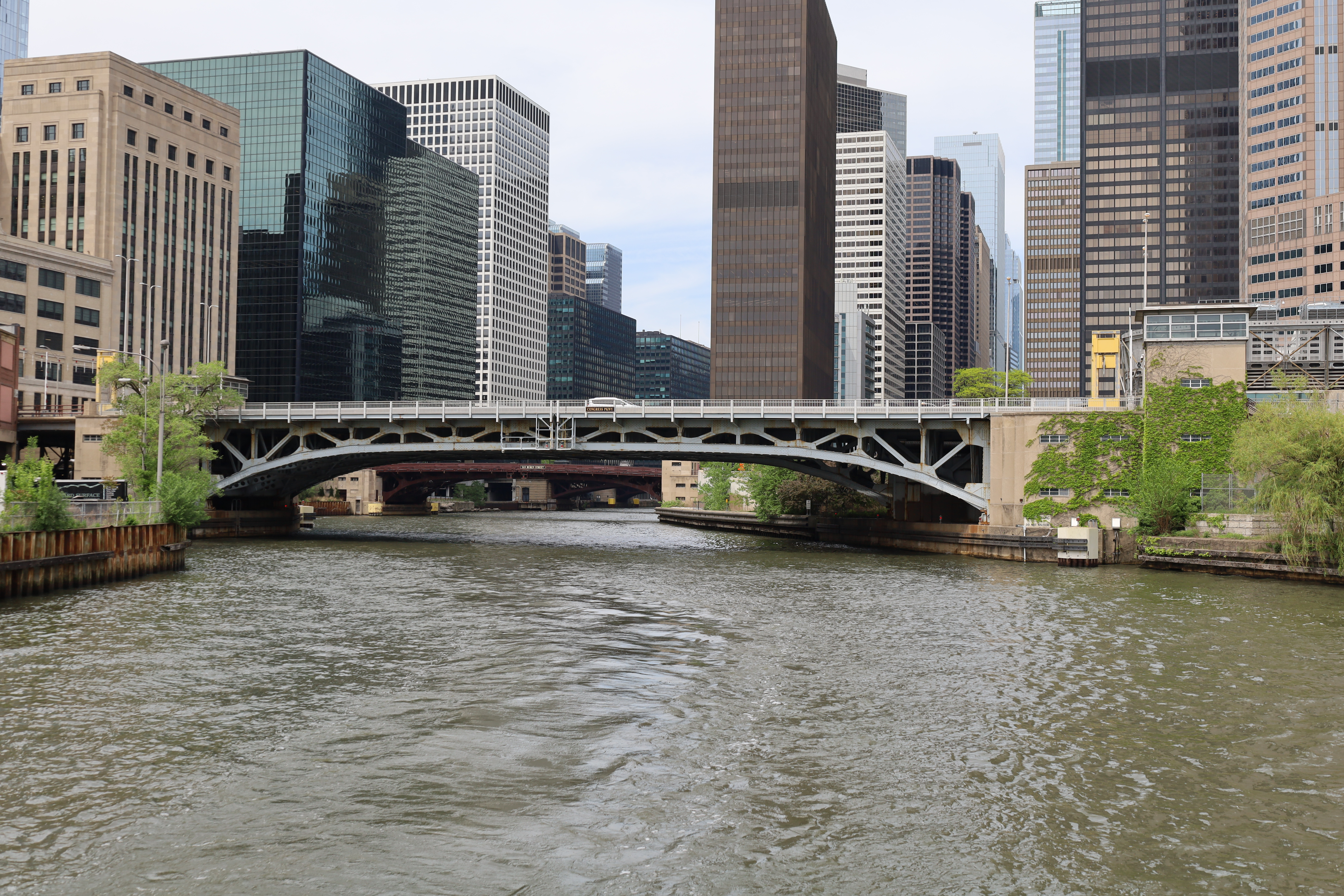
- The bridge in 2023
- Coordinates: 41°52′32.3″N 87°38′12″W
- Carries: Motor vehicles on Ida B. Wells Drive
- Crosses: South Branch Chicago River
- Locale: Chicago, Illinois, U.S.
- Official name: Wagner Memorial Bridge
- Other name: Ida B. Wells Drive Bridge

Characteristics
- Design: Dual-span fixed-trunnion bascule bridge
- No. of lanes: 7

History
- Construction cost: $5 million
- Opened: 1956
- Rebuilt: 1981; 2010–2012

Location
- Interactive map of Congress Parkway Bridge

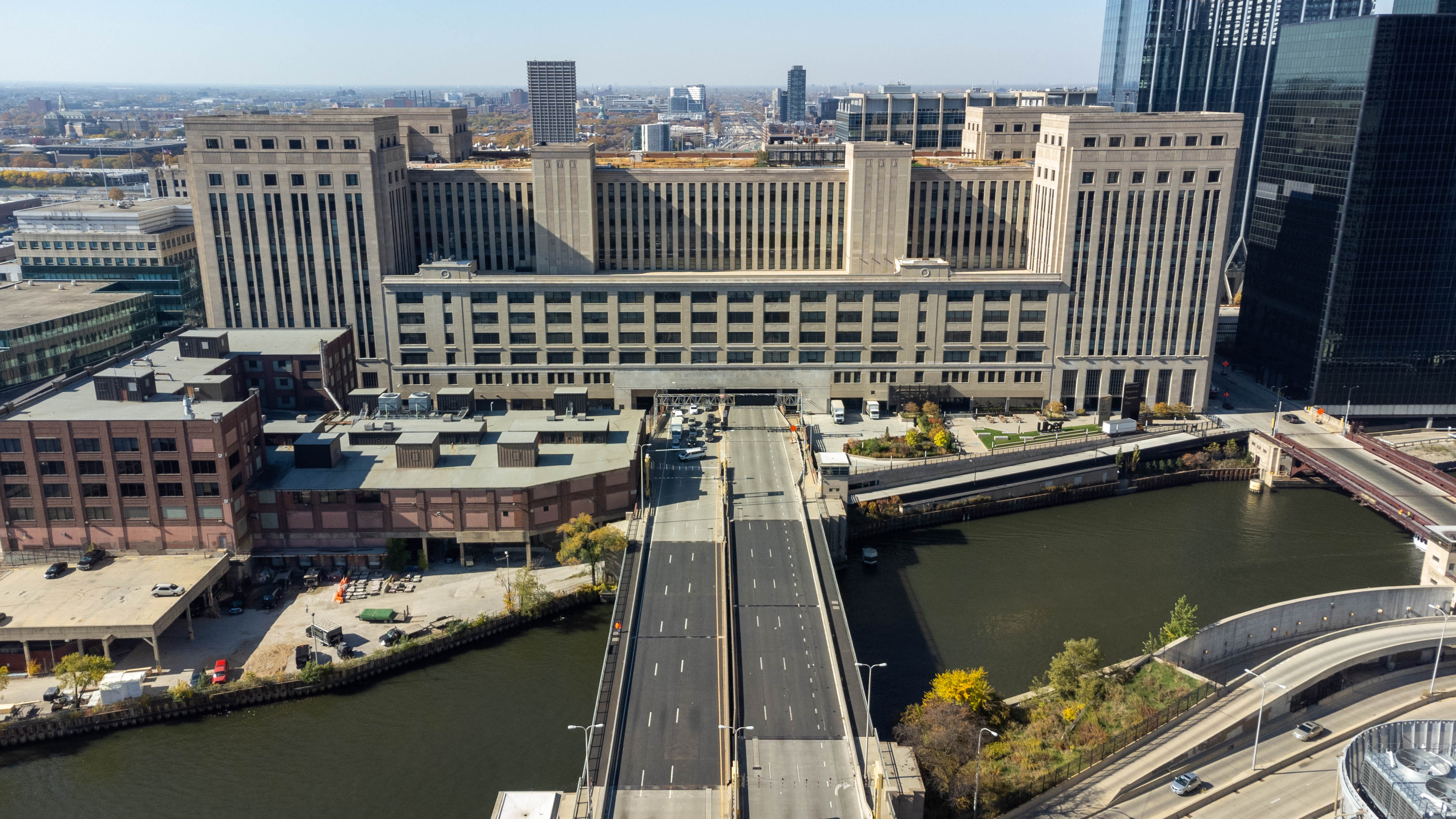
The bridge and the Old Post Office in 2022

Congress Parkway Bridge, also known as Ida B. Wells Drive Bridge and officially named the Wagner Memorial Bridge, is a seven-lane bascule bridge in Chicago, Illinois, U.S. It crosses the South Branch Chicago River providing an expressway connection between Interstate 290 (Eisenhower Expressway) and Ida B. Wells Drive/Wacker Drive. The bridge is located immediately to the east of a highway tunnel in the Old Post Office.

== History ==
The bridge was first conceived by Daniel Burnham and Edward H. Bennett in the 1909 Plan of Chicago. The plan proposed Congress Street to be the main east–west boulevard in downtown and the West Side. By the 1920s, city planners opted for a superhighway instead of a boulevard. Although some planners suggested routing the superhighway along Monroe Street, Bennett staunchly advocated for the highway to travel along Congress Street.

When the U.S. Post Office Department proposed an expansion of the Old Post Office in the late 1920s, the expansion would have physically blocked the proposed superhighway and the bridge approach. The Post Office Department eventually built a tunnel through the structure for the future superhighway after negotiating with Edward Bennett and the Chicago Plan Commission. The newly expanded building opened in 1932.

In the 1940 Comprehensive Superhighway Plan, the city of Chicago designated the superhighway as its highest priority due to high traffic volume on the West Side; land acquisition and construction on the highway right of way began in 1949. The bridge itself began construction in 1950 and opened to traffic in 1956 at the cost of $5 million (equivalent to $59 million in 2025).

On July 13, 1953, during the bridge's construction, the city council named the bridge in honor of the late 14th Ward Alderman Clarence P. Wagner, a powerful city politician who was killed in a car crash three days prior near International Falls, Minnesota.

=== Reconstruction ===
The bridge was first rehabilitated in 1981 to replace the steel bridge deck and adding Jersey barrier in place of a curb on the median.

The bridge was rehabilitated for the second time from April 1, 2010, to May 15, 2012, as part of a $33 million project, which replaced the steel deck with a paved bridge surface and repaired the bridge structure.
