= Congress Street =

Congress Street may refer to:

- Congress Street (Boston, Massachusetts), a prominent street in Boston, Massachusetts
- Congress Street (Chicago, Illinois), also formerly known as Congress Parkway, a prominent street in Chicago, Illinois
- Congress Street (Detroit, Michigan), a prominent street in Detroit, Michigan
- Congress Street (Hartford, Connecticut), a prominent street in Hartford, Connecticut
- Congress Street (Portland, Maine), a prominent street in Portland, Maine
- Congress Street (Savannah, Georgia), a prominent street in Savannah, Georgia

== See also ==
- Congress Street Bridge (disambiguation)
