= Illinois Center =

Development in Chicago, Illinois

Coordinates: 41.88639°N 87.62164°W

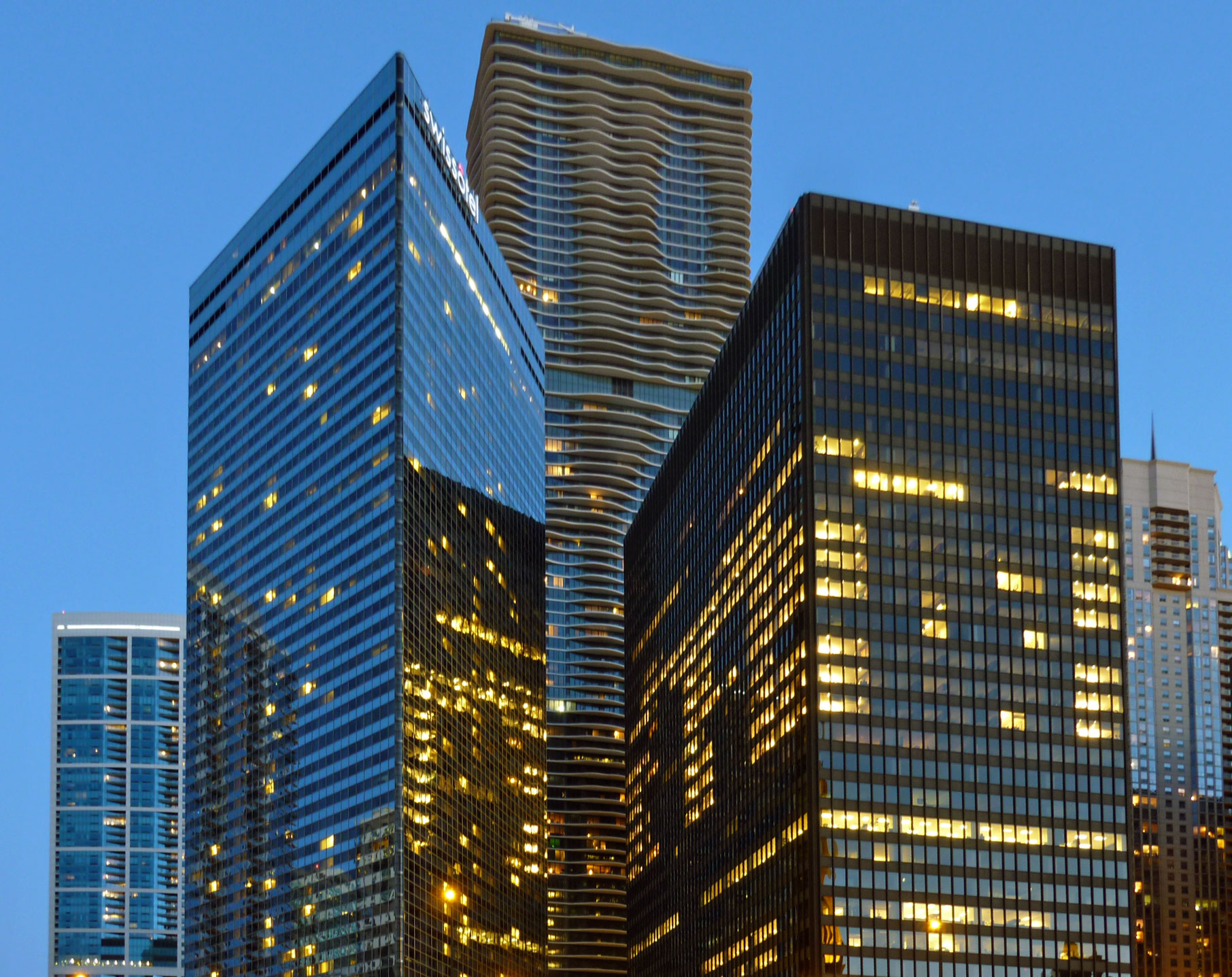

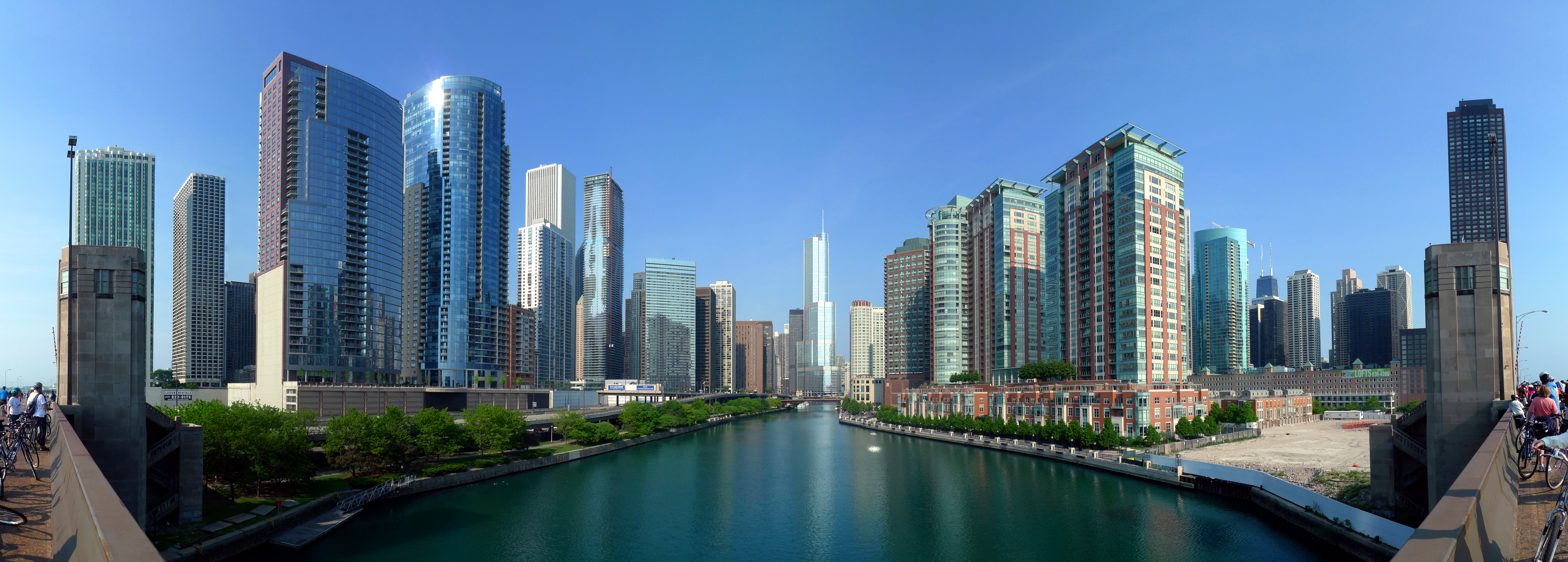
Chicago River is the south border (right) of the Near North Side and Streeterville and the north border (left) of Chicago Loop, Lakeshore East and Illinois Center (viewed from Lake Shore Drive's Link Bridge with Trump International Hotel & Tower at jog in the river in the center)

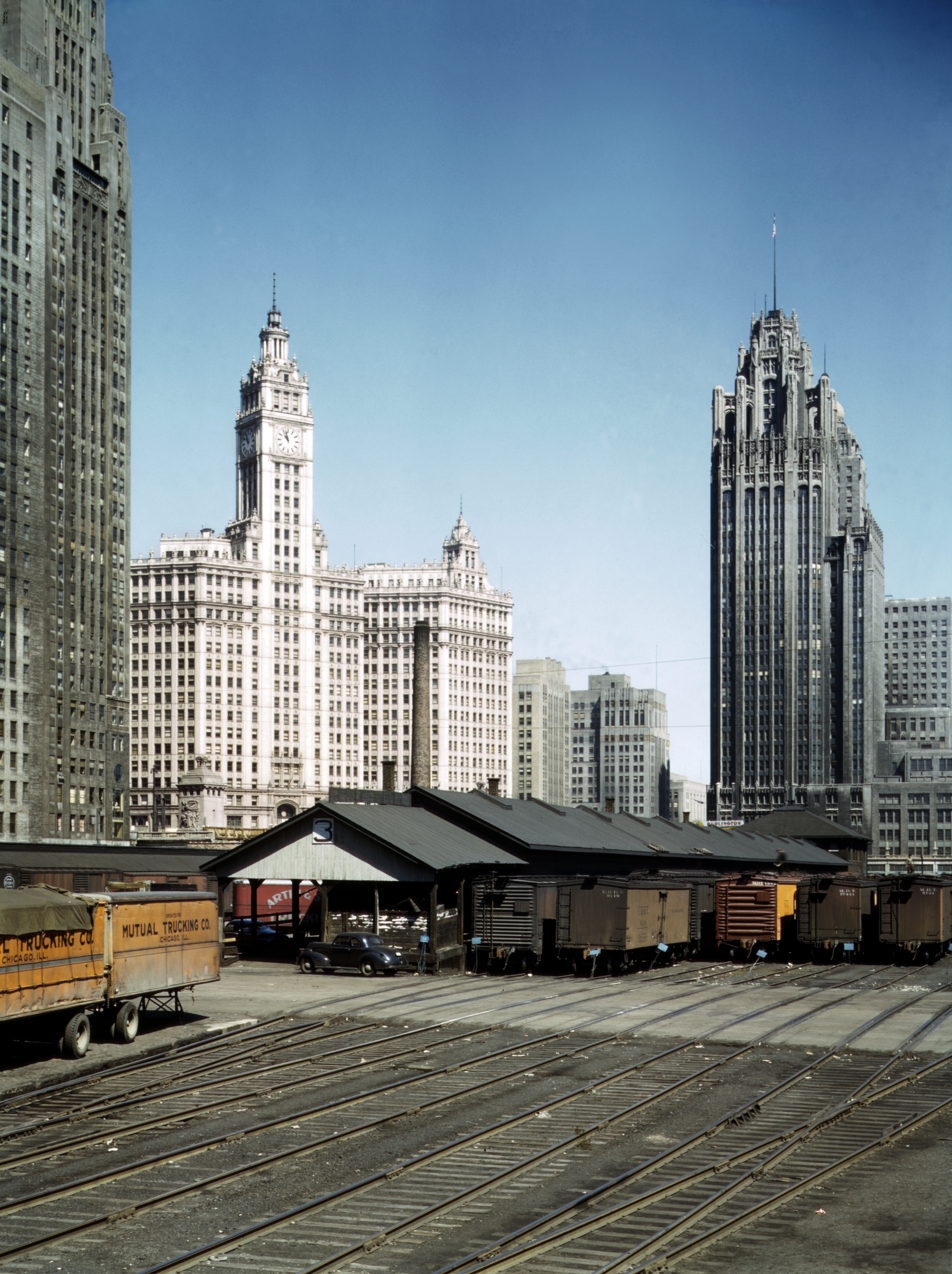
The former Illinois Central Railroad freight terminal with 333 North Michigan, Wrigley Building and Tribune Tower in the background (April 1943)

Illinois Center is a mixed-use urban development in downtown Chicago, Illinois, United States, lying east of Michigan Avenue. It is notable in that the streets running through it have three levels. Elsewhere in Chicago, some streets have two levels, with the lower level for through traffic and service vehicles and the upper level for other local traffic. In Illinois Center, the lower level has been split, with a middle level for through traffic and a lower level for service vehicles.

The development was built on land that had formerly been used for railroad yards by the Illinois Central Railroad, which merged into the Canadian National Railway in 1999. The earliest building is One Illinois Center designed by Ludwig Mies van der Rohe and completed in 1970. The west half of the rail yards were built out first; the east half was for a time turned into a temporary golf course on the lowest level, where the rail yards had been. The golf course has since been turned into a park, now surrounded by an urban village of high-rise buildings called Lakeshore East.

The development consists of four blocks with a large area to the east. It is bounded on the west by Michigan Avenue, which has two levels. Just east of that road, the upper level rises to become a higher third level, only accessible on the west edge of the development and at the east end of Upper Wacker Drive. Stetson Avenue and Columbus Drive run north-south, and Lake Street, South Water Street, and Wacker Drive run east-west. Randolph Street lies a block south of the main part, and forms the south border of the east half.

One Prudential Plaza, Two Prudential Plaza and the Aon Center are south of the main part.

== See also ==
- Chicago Pedway
