= Columbus Drive (Chicago) =

Street in Chicago, Illinois

Columbus Drive (Fairbanks Court)
- Christopher Columbus Drive; 300 East
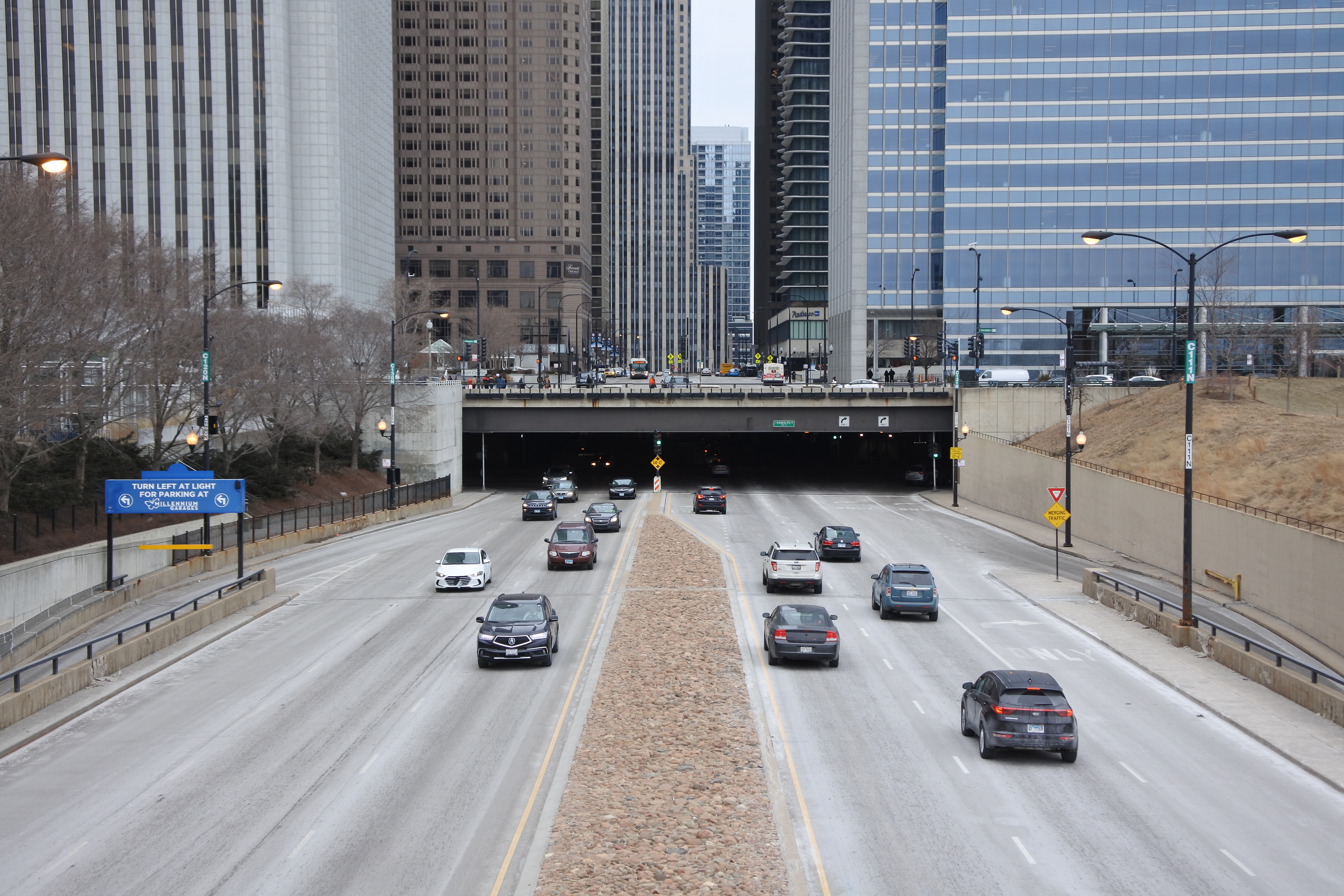
- Columbus Drive at Randolph Street
- Maintained by: CDOT
- Length: 2.21 mi (3.56 km)
- Location: Chicago
- South end: US 41 in Near South Side
- North end: Chicago Avenue in Near North Side

Columbus Drive is a north–south street in Chicago, Illinois, which bisects Grant Park. It is 300 East in Chicago's street numbering system. Its south end is an interchange with Lake Shore Drive (US 41) at Soldier Field. After intersecting Grand Avenue, it becomes Fairbanks Court and continues to the north, terminating at Chicago Avenue.

== Route description ==
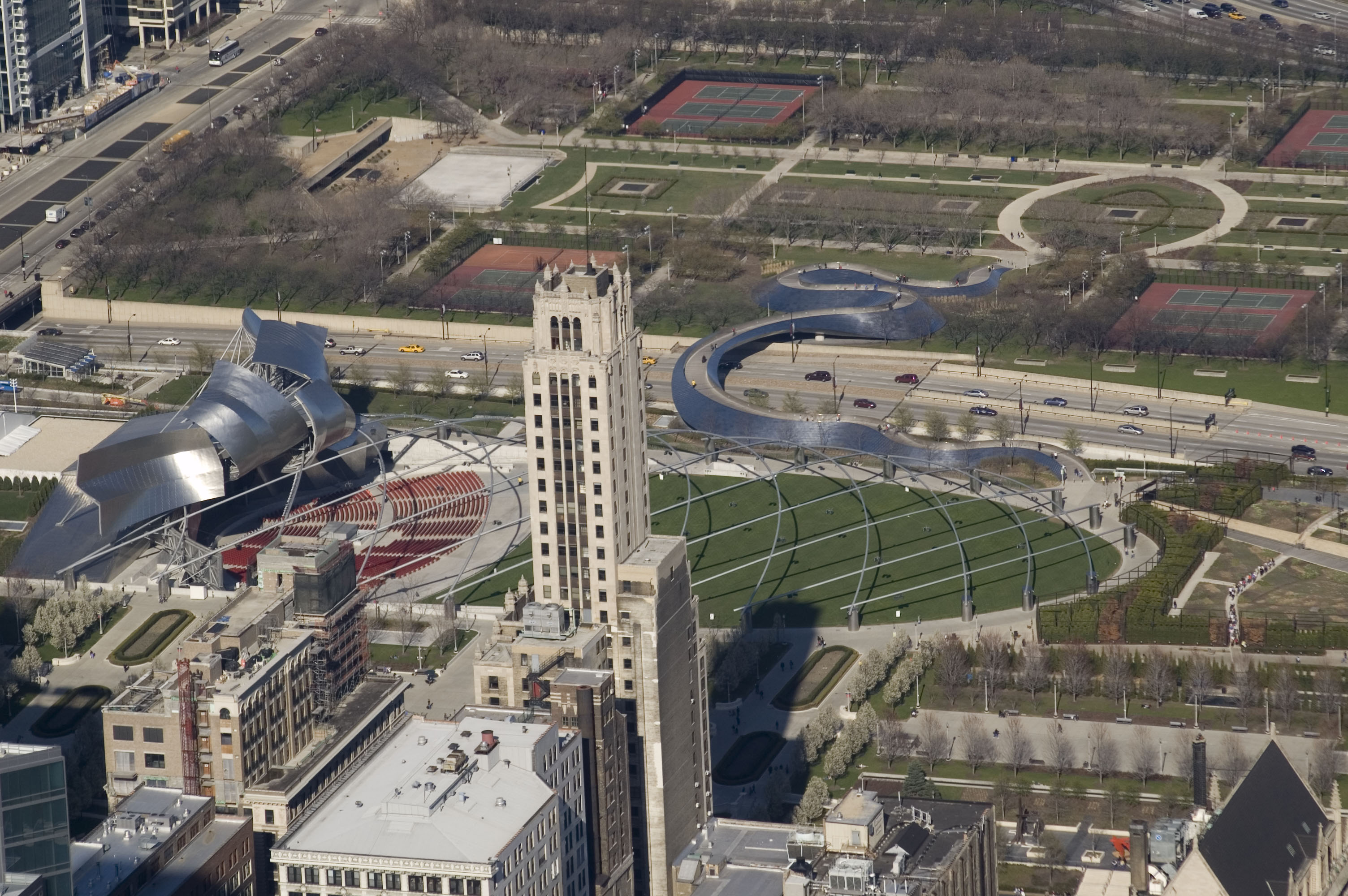
Columbus Drive passing beneath the BP Pedestrian Bridge beyond Millennium Park from Willis Tower

In the Illinois Center development, the main lanes of Columbus Drive are on the middle deck of a three-level structure. That level intersects with the middle levels of Randolph Street, Lake Street, South Water Street and Wacker Drive. All these intersecting streets also exist on the lower and upper levels, except for Lake, which is a pedestrian mall on the upper level; both of these levels go only from Randolph to Wacker. Level-transition ramps are connected directly to Columbus at the following points:

- Southbound down-ramp and northbound up-ramp between the lower and middle levels, between Randolph and Lake; no access to Lake from the up-ramp, which merges just to the north of the middle level intersection
- Westbound down-ramps and eastbound up-ramps in the middle of South Water between Columbus and Stetson Avenue, connecting lower and middle levels at Stetson (west end) to the middle and upper levels at Columbus (east end)
- Westbound up-ramp from the service (lowest) level at Wacker to a point just west of Stetson, where it joins the middle level of Wacker (which then descends to become the lower deck of the subsequent two-level Wacker)

The middle level of Columbus Drive crosses the Chicago River via the Columbus Avenue Bridge, a bascule structure built in 1982, and known by many locals as the Chicago kissing bridge. North of the river, it intersects the upper level of North Water Street and passes over that road's lower level before descending to ground level just before reaching Illinois Street.

== History ==
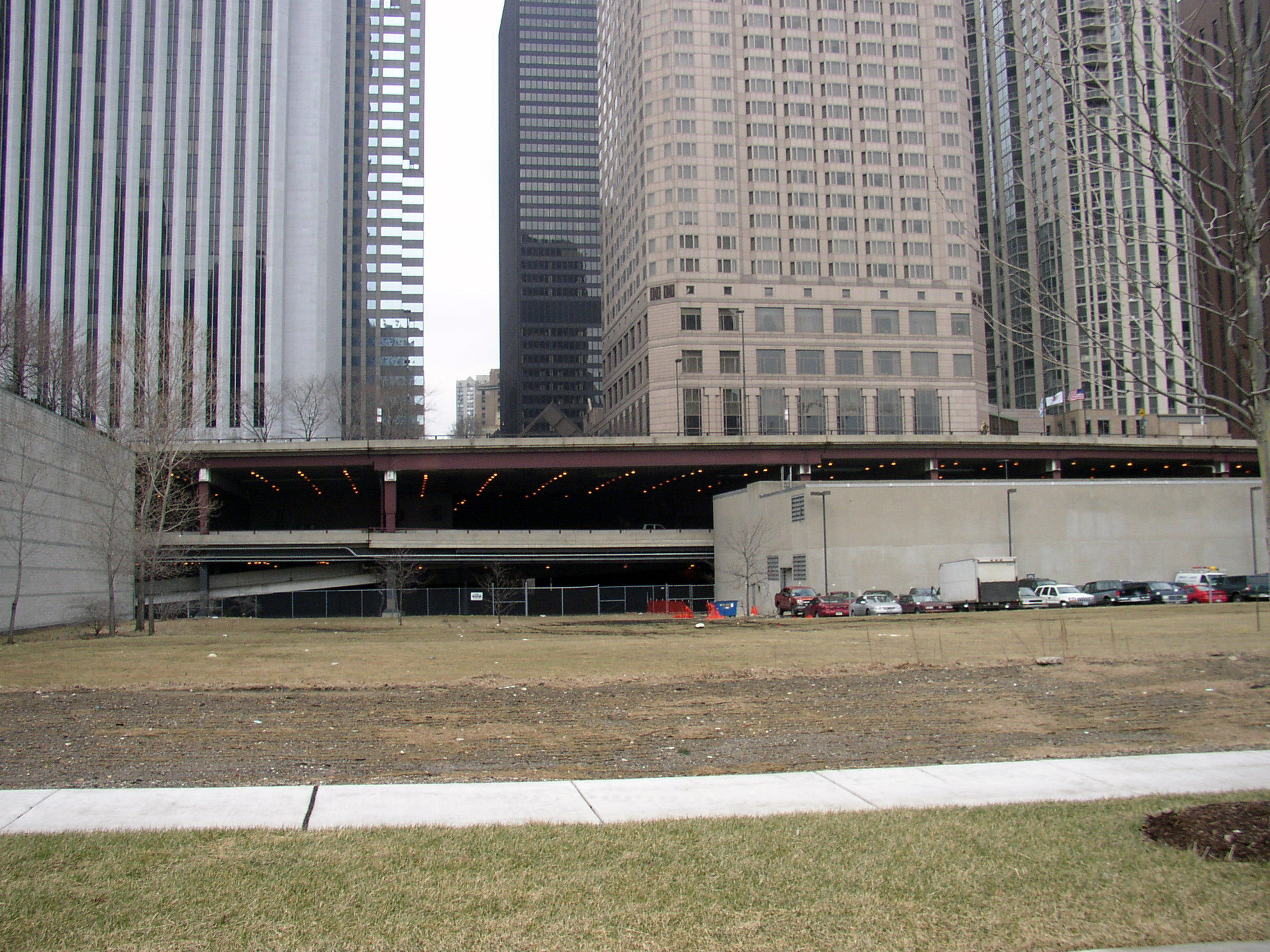
Looking west at the three-level Columbus Drive from Lakeshore East

Originally known as the Inner Drive, the road was renamed for Christopher Columbus and dedicated in a ceremony on August 3, 1933, as part of Italian day at the Century of Progress fair.

Columbus originally only went south from Monroe Street, south of Illinois Center. In 1980, it was extended to Wacker, including the three-level portion, and it was built over the Chicago River in 1982, connecting to Fairbanks Court. In 1992 the upper level of North Water Street was built.

== Transportation ==
There is no bus route dedicated entirely to Columbus Drive/Fairbanks Court. However, numerous bus routes run along sections of the road.

South from Balbo Drive, Columbus Drive hosts the following bus routes that exit or enter Lake Shore Drive: CTA bus routes 2, 6, 10, J14, 26, and 28 as well as Pace bus routes 850, 851, and 855. CTA bus route 124 runs along Columbus Drive from Randolph Drive to Illinois Street (Navy Pier-bound) or Grand Avenue (Union Station-bound). Bus routes 4, X4, 6, and 20 run along the upper deck of Columbus Drive. Bus route 2 briefly runs along Fairbanks Court from Illinois Street/Grand Avenue to Ohio Street/Ontario Street; routes 3, 26, 66, and 157 runs along the rest of Fairbanks Court going northbound. Route 3 ends at the intersection of Erie Street and Fairbank Court, while Route 26 ends at the intersection of Chicago Avenue and Fairbank Court.

== Intersections ==
The entire route is in Chicago, Cook County.

mi	km	Destinations	Notes
0.00	0.00	US 41 (Lake Shore Drive)	Southern terminus of Columbus Drive
0.04	0.064	McFetridge Drive	To Museum Campus
0.23	0.37	Roosevelt Road	
0.62	1.00	Balbo Drive	
0.80	1.29	Ida B. Wells Drive to I-90 / I-94 / I-290	Eastern terminus of Ida B. Wells Drive
0.97	1.56	Jackson Drive	
1.15	1.85	Monroe Street	
1.39	2.24	Randolph Street	
1.49	2.40	Lake Street	To Aon Center
1.57	2.53	South Water Street	
1.64	2.64	Wacker Drive	
1.70	2.74	William P. Fahey Bridge	
1.75	2.82	North Water Street	
1.85	2.98	Illinois Street	One-way road to Navy Pier; eastbound only
1.91	3.07	Grand Avenue	One-way road; westbound only
1.96	3.15	Ohio Street	One-way road; eastbound only
2.02	3.25	Ontario Street	One-way road; westbound only
2.07	3.33	Erie Street	One-way road; eastbound only
2.13	3.43	Huron Street	One-way road; westbound only
2.18	3.51	Superior Street	One-way road; eastbound only
2.21	3.56	Chicago Avenue	Northern terminus of Fairbanks Court
1.000 mi = 1.609 km; 1.000 km = 0.621 mi

== See also ==
- Multilevel streets in Chicago
