= Columbus Drive Bridge (Chicago) =

Bridge in Chicago, Illinois

- Columbus Drive Bridge
- Coordinates: 41°53′18.8″N 87°37′14.0″W
- Carries: Columbus Drive
- Crosses: Chicago River
- Locale: Chicago
- Official name: William P. Fahey Bridge
- Heritage status: Chicago Landmark

Characteristics
- Design: Double-leaf, fixed counterweight, trunnion bascule bridge

History
- Designer: City of Chicago and Envirodyne Engineers, Inc.
- Construction end: 1982
- Opened: October 31, 1982

Location
- Interactive map of Columbus Drive Bridge

The Columbus Drive Bridge (officially dedicated as the William P. Fahey Bridge) is a double-leaf, trunnion bascule bridge that carries Columbus Drive across the main stem of the Chicago River in downtown Chicago, Illinois. Completed in 1982 at a cost of $33 million, it is the youngest movable bridge crossing the Chicago River in the downtown Loop area.

== History and dedication ==
=== Planning and opposition ===
The bridge was planned to extend Columbus Drive northward, linking traffic corridors between Michigan Avenue and Lake Shore Drive, while directly accommodating heavy traffic within the newly developing Illinois Center commercial complex. During its proposal phase, the project faced resistance from the Greater North Michigan Avenue Association, which expressed concerns that expanding Columbus Drive across the river would funnel overwhelming vehicular traffic into the residential and retail sectors of Streeterville.

=== Opening and mechanical failures ===
Constructed by Paschen Contractors and the American Bridge Company, the structure officially opened on October 31, 1982. Mayor Jane Byrne dedicated the bridge in memory of William P. Fahey, a Chicago police officer shot and killed in the line of duty earlier that February following a traffic stop. To commemorate his service, the first vehicle permitted to cross the bridge was driven by Fahey's widow. From 1982 to 1986, the bridge served as an integral traffic detour during the heavy realignment and reconstruction of the nearby Lake Shore Drive "S-curve."

Only five months after opening, the bridge suffered a major mechanical breakdown on April 15, 1983, when inspectors discovered cracked and broken operating gears. Because federal maritime regulations mandated keeping the river open to commercial shipping, the bridge leaves were locked in an open, raised position for several months while emergency repairs were carried out, completely halting vehicular traffic until October 1983.

== Design ==
The bridge was designed as a fixed-trunnion bascule bridge by the City of Chicago's Division of Bridges and Viaducts in partnership with Envirodyne Engineers, Inc. It was the first downtown Chicago bascule bridge to incorporate steel box girders instead of traditional open-web trusses, a structural engineering choice that allowed the principal support elements to remain completely hidden beneath the bridge deck. It was also the first Loop bascule bridge to feature trunnions set back far enough from the riverbank to allow a continuous pedestrian walkway beneath the superstructure at river level.

Architecturally, the bridge reflects a late-20th-century public engineering shift toward structural minimalism. It exhibits a lack of ornamentation compared to older, intricately sculpted Chicago bascule bridges, featuring a single, simplified bridgetender house rather than matching multi-tower structures. Despite its utilitarian appearance, architectural commentators generally consider it to have a cleaner design than other local bridges built during the same decade, such as the nearby Randolph Street Bridge. In 1984, the design was awarded the American Institute of Steel Construction (AISC) Prize Bridge award in the movable span category.

== Engineering error discovery ==
In the era preceding Computer-Aided Design (CAD), the Chicago Department of Public Works regularly built physical, three-dimensional scale models to cross-check blueprint geometry. Eric Bronsky, an architectural modelbuilder for the city from 1976 to 1989, was tasked with building the official display model for the Columbus Drive Bridge.

While assembling the physical components of the model, Bronsky identified an alignment conflict indicative of a structural error in the engineering plans. After alerting the bridge designers, the engineering team verified the drafting mistake, allowing the blueprint design to be modified before physical construction began on the river. The physical model remained on public display until roughly 1990; its current whereabouts are unknown.

== In popular culture ==
The Columbus Drive Bridge served as a filming location for the 2011 science-fiction action film Transformers: Dark of the Moon.
