= Randolph Street Market =

Monthly market in Chicago, U.S.

Randolph Street Market

The Randolph Street Market Festival is a hybrid indoor-outdoor market held outdoors the last weekend of each month, May through October, and indoors the third weekend of October, November and December.

== History ==
Sally Schwartz, a native of Chicago, is the founder of the Randolph Street Market. She is an events specialist, and previously owned and managed Paint Me A Party Productions, a corporate special events and incentive travel marketing company. Special Events magazine listed the company among the Top 50 Event Planners (cite SE mag, 2002). Schwartz was profiled in the Chicago Sun-Times Business Section in 2000. She has a degree in marketing from Virginia Tech and worked for several years in advertising before forming her own companies. The Randolph Street Market began in 2003 as the Chicago Antique Market and grew to add the Indie Designers section in 2005, the Holiday Mart in 2006, and the vintage and collectibles areas in 2008.

== Summer markets ==
During the summer season, May–September, the market features high quality goods and food items; the markets have monthly themes. The Randolph Street Market Festival is held the last weekend of each month, May through October. Trading hours are on Saturday and Sunday. Occasionally the market sponsors a special charitable preview event on Friday evenings preceding market days. The market has been compared to New York’s Chelsea Flea Market, London’s Portobello market, and the Paris market at Porte de Clignancourt; it is "...an urban antique market reminiscent of those found in Europe and New York City..." writes Jenniger Winneg in Center Stage Chicago.

"Memorial Day...marks start of the alfresco shopping season...outdoor bazaars in the West Loop, a full city block--1350 W. Randolph Street, and 1340 W. Washington Street, between Ada Street and Ogden Avenue---is packed with antiques, vintage clothing, midcentury decor, and indie craft vendors..." writes Chicago magazine editors. "During the last weekend of each [summer] month, the Randolph Street Market Festival... [brings] to the Loop an astounding array of Americana and antiques, including home furnishings, art, fashion and jewelry from all decades and all parts of the globe."

Over 250 exhibitors and upwards of 10,000 visitors participate in the festival which is a popular weekend destination for Chicagoans and visitors to the city. It is the largest market of its kind in the Midwest. The Randolph Street Market Festival offers buyers hundreds of boutique spaces presented by dealers, purveyors and designers from a multi-state region.

The Indie Designers market boutiques at the Randolph Street Market offer unique Chicago-designed fashion direct from the local designers. Art, jewelry and décor made by local crafters is also available. Ruth La Ferla, a New York Times fashion writer included the Indie Designers market in a "trends" article, "Taking Fashion To the Streets: Could the future of style be set up in a bazaar on your block?"

The Randolph Street Market Festival, including its affiliated markets, covers some 8½ acres, over 350,000 square feet of indoor-outdoor exhibition space, anchored by the Chicago Plumber’s Union historic Art Deco style building, in the Main Hall and Lower Hall areas, and in the surrounding parking lot during the summer season.

Shoppers find furnishings, vintage jewelry and fashions, and collectibles along with the recently added areas: the Vinyl Swap Meet, with rock, jazz, showtunes, and other collectible records and albums. The Fancy Food Market and cocktail areas carry deluxe food items such as artisan chocolates, cakes, breads and other baked goods, olive oils, salsa and other specialty foods. In the Global Goods Bazaar area, crafts and artisan goods are representative of Chicago’s many ethnic communities. In addition, the fall market includes experts to help antiquers appraise, preserve and conserve valuable finds including furniture, crystal, art restoration and lamp, lighting and other repair services. Mimosas and other favorite cocktails and non-alcoholic drinks are served at the Market Bar.

== Winter markets ==
In the winter months, October through December, Randolph Street Market specialty markets—Modern Vintage Chicago Fashion & Jewelry Explosion, and the Holiday Market, move indoors at the historic Plumber’s Union Hall. The fall and winter markets are set in the Main and Lower Hall areas of the historic Art Deco Plumbers Union Building in Chicago's West Loop. Trading days are Saturdays and Sundays at the market, which runs on the third weekends of October, November and December.

Modern Vintage Chicago Fall Fashion & Jewelry Explosion is held the third weekend of October, indoors, and features specialty items including vintage jewelry from all turn-of-the-century to 1980s, among the brands of handbags, scarves, and other wardrobe items to wear and collect are Missoni, Halston, Chanel and Ungaro, Home furnishings items include art deco lamps, collectible vintage artworks and decor, early radios, art deco jewelry. Vintage jewelry sellers bring Weiss, Marion Haskell, and other popular brands and unsigned pieces. Nate Berkus wrote about the fall fashion market in the Wall Street Journal, "You can land distinct antiques, great vintage estate jewelry, and cool designer pieces."

The Randolph Street 6th Annual Holiday Market is all indoors and is held on the third weekends through November and December. The Holiday Market features "a sampling of everything with an emphasis on gifts, entertaining, decorating and wearing," according to market founder Sally Schwartz. The Holiday Market also includes handmade decorations and crafts, as well as specialty foods. The Vinyl Swap Meet, Global Gifts Bazaar and Fancy Food Market unique holiday-time items. The Market Bar features new cocktail ideas for the season.

== See also ==
- Randolph Street
