= Randolph Street =

Street in Chicago, Illinois

Randolph Street (Randolph Drive)
- 150 North; Edmund J. Randolph Street
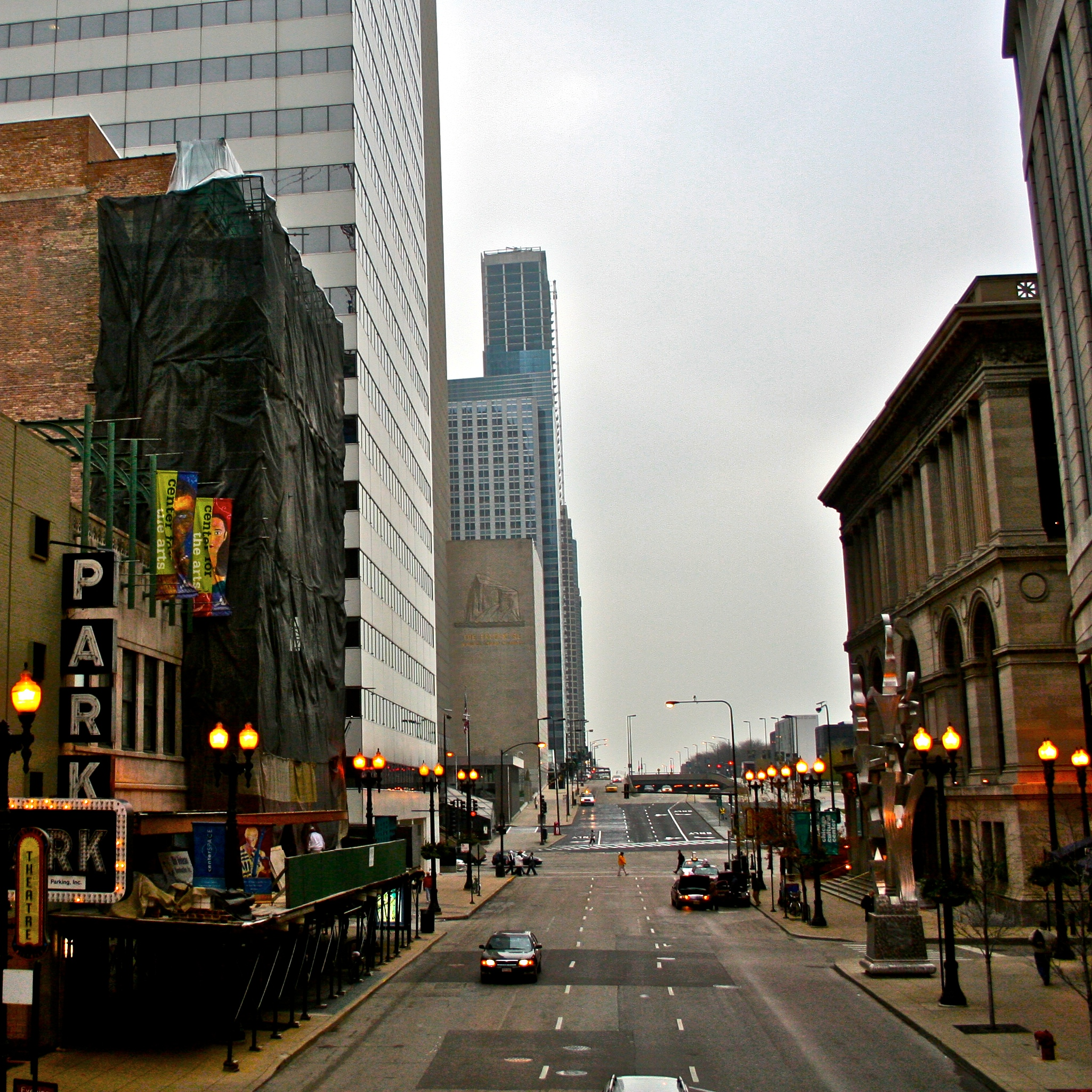
- Randolph Street, looking east from the Loop Elevated above Wabash Avenue
- Interactive map of Randolph Street (Randolph Drive)
- Location: Chicago, Illinois, United States
- West end: Wolf Road in Hillside
- East end: US 41 (Lake Shore Drive) in Chicago

Randolph Street is a street in Chicago, Illinois, United States. It runs east–west through the Loop, carrying westbound traffic west from Michigan Avenue across the Chicago River on the Randolph Street Bridge, interchanging with the Kennedy Expressway (I-90/I-94), and continuing west. It serves as the northern boundary of Grant Park and the Chicago Landmark Historic Michigan Boulevard District. Several large theaters, as well as city and state government buildings are on and adjacent to Randolph. Metra's Millennium Station is located under Randolph Street.

== History ==
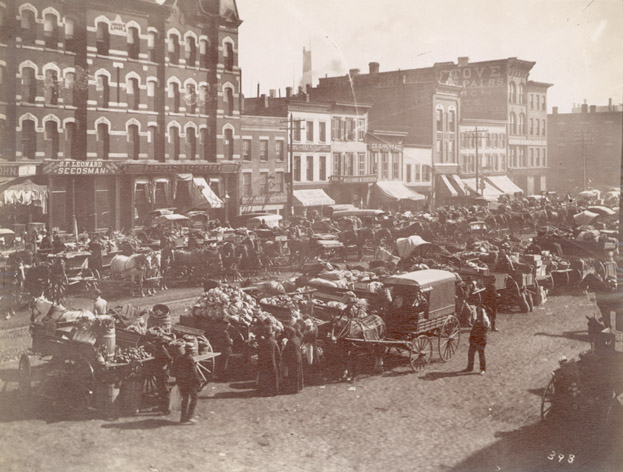
Randolph Street Market, west of Desplaines Street, 1890

Randolph Street was named for Randolph County, Illinois, in turn named after Edmund Randolph (1753–1813), Governor of Virginia, Secretary of State, and the first United States Attorney General.

The street was part of the original plat of Chicago in the 1830s, originally ending at Michigan Avenue. In the 1850s and 1860s, gambling was a favorite pastime at the saloons on Randolph, and there were so many gunfights in the vicinity that downtown Randolph Street became known as "Hairtrigger Block."

In 1937, in conjunction with the building of Lake Shore Drive, a double-decker viaduct was built over the Illinois Central Railroad's rail yard, connecting Michigan to Lake Shore (which was where Field Boulevard is now). This viaduct still exists west of Columbus Drive as the upper level; it intersected LSD (Field) at the current upper level. The lower level of the viaduct was never used.

In 1963 the upper level was built east of Field to serve the new Outer Drive East building. Between 1970 and 1980, the viaduct was demolished east of Columbus; this probably happened after the extension of Wacker Drive to Lake Shore opened in December 1975. By 1988 the new Randolph had been completed, including a new upper level west of Columbus. East of Columbus, this level was built to slope down to the old upper level, which was orphaned by the move of Lake Shore Drive in 1986. The old viaduct was kept west of Columbus, and it slopes down to a middle level east towards the new Lake Shore Drive.

== East Randolph ==
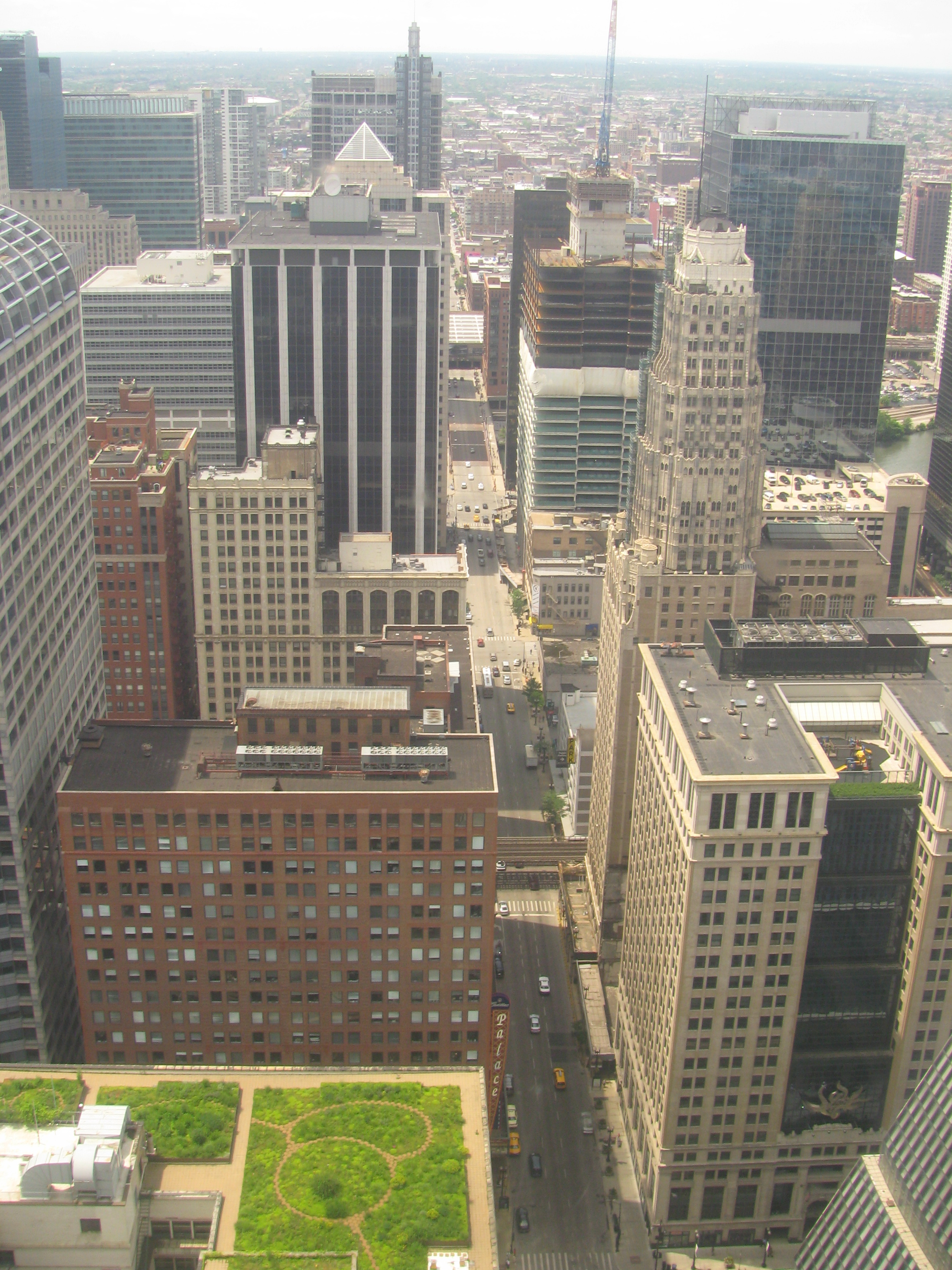
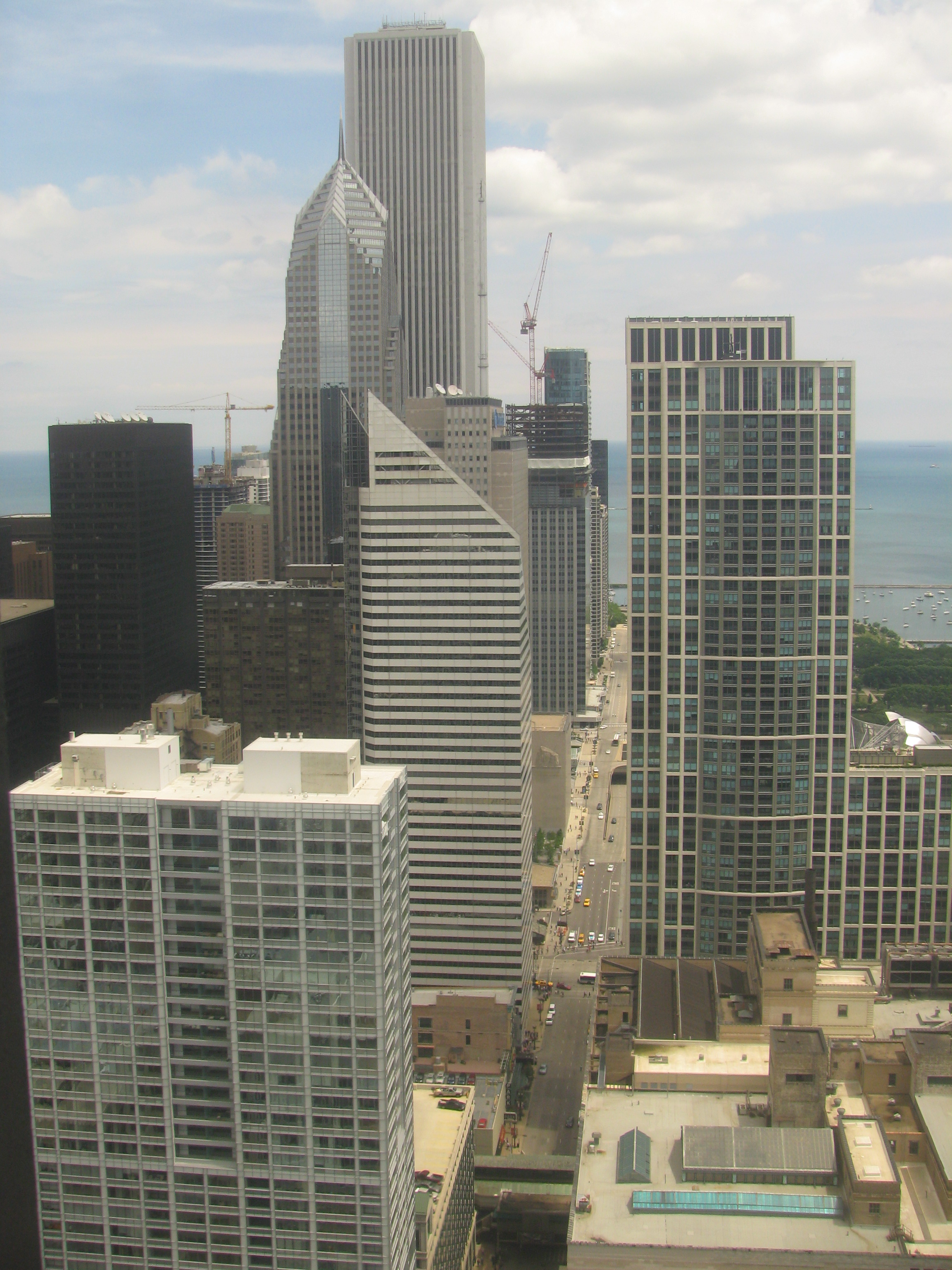
Westward (left) and eastward (right) views from Daley Center

East of Michigan Avenue, Randolph Street is a two-way street taking traffic to Lake Shore Drive. Just east of Michigan, Randolph crosses over the Metra Electric District and splits into two levels, an upper level (via the outer lanes) and a middle level (via the inner lanes). The upper level carries local traffic to the Illinois Center, Aon Center and Prudential Plaza developments, and was built in conjunction with them; it also takes traffic to the new Lakeshore East development. Intersections with the upper level are provided with Stetson Avenue (which only heads north, and only intersects westbound Randolph) and Columbus Drive (which only heads north). The middle level, which takes traffic to Lake Shore Drive, intersects the middle level of Columbus. A lower level also exists between Stetson and Columbus, intersecting lower Columbus (and ramps to middle Columbus). The middle level East of Columbus Drive is known as Randolph Drive.

East of Columbus, Randolph continues as a triple-decker street. The lower level intersects with a short piece of Field Boulevard; at that point, the upper level narrows to lie only over the north side of the middle level. Field Boulevard was the original Lake Shore Drive, and crossed the upper level of Randolph (which was the only level at the time). Old Lake Shore Drive (Field Boulevard) south of Randolph is now the Cancer Survivors Plaza; north of Randolph it was a viaduct at the level of current Upper Randolph and has been demolished. A new Upper Field Boulevard was recently built as part of the Lakeshore East development; it ramps down to ground (lower) level.

After Field Boulevard, the narrowed upper level and service level continue east to the double-decker Harbor Drive, where they end. Harbor Drive provides access to several buildings and then itself dead ends. The middle level then continues east to an interchange with Lake Shore Drive and a dead end just beyond.

== Buildings ==
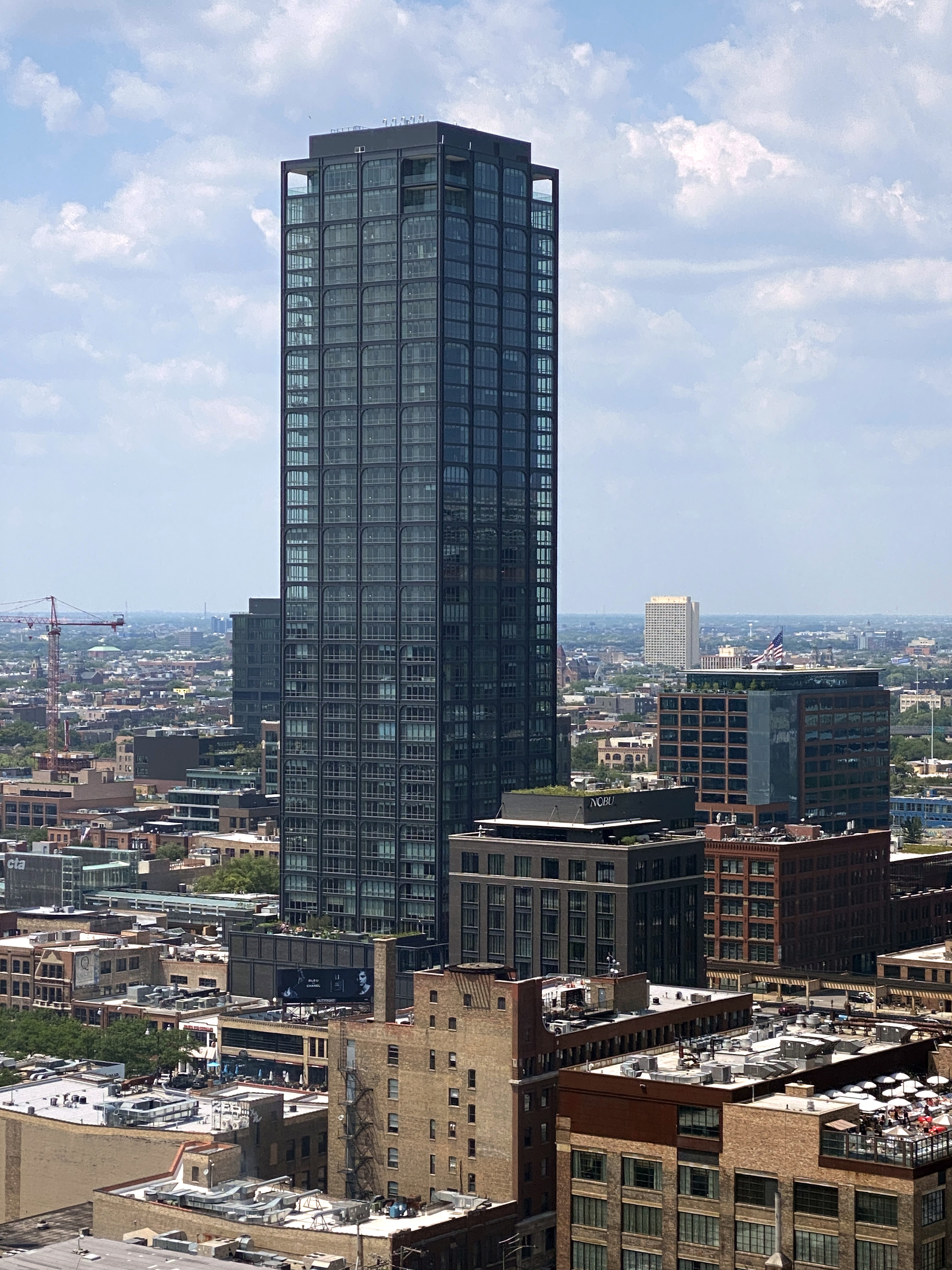
900 West Randolph Street

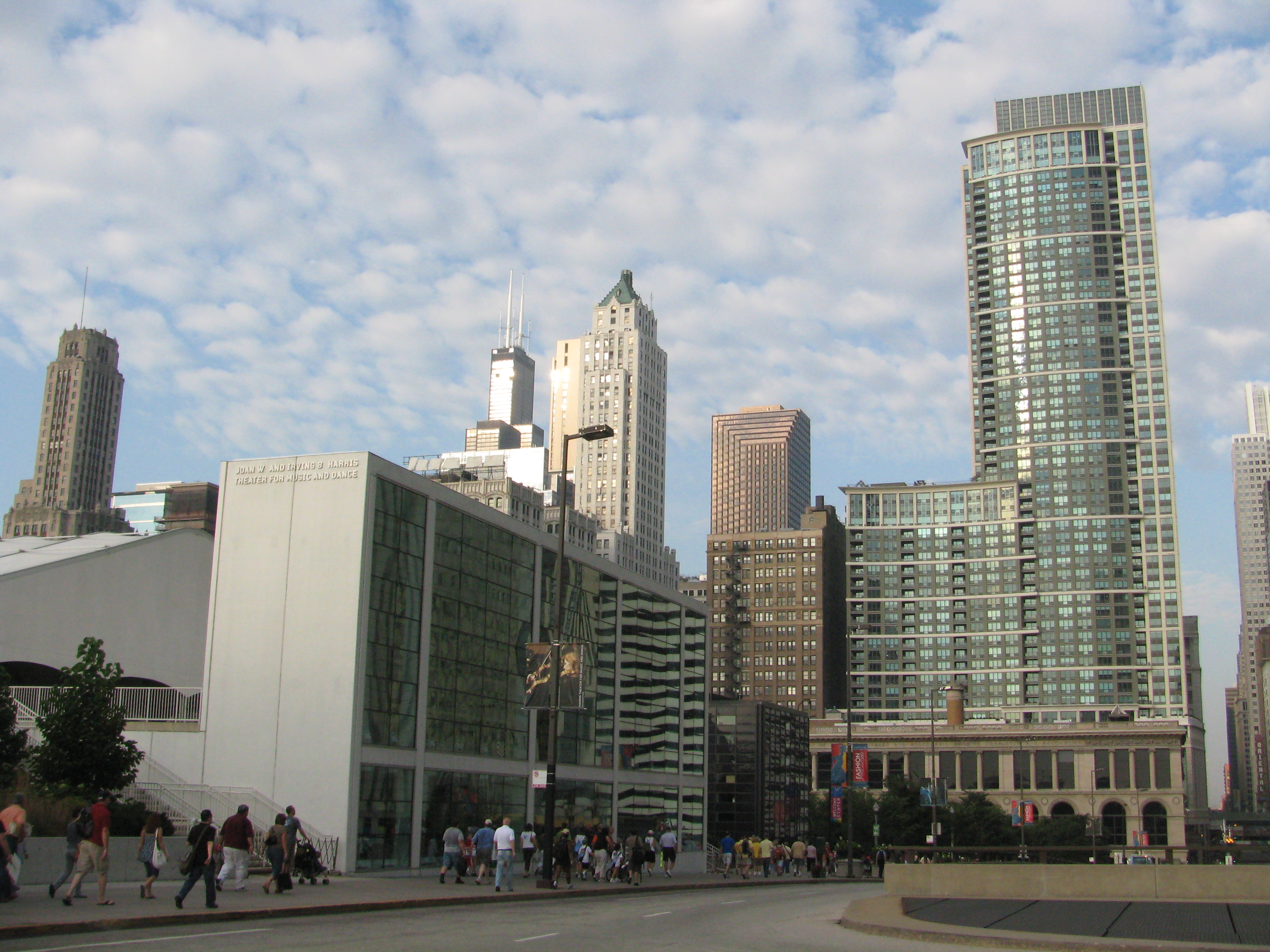
Harris Theater (left), the Chicago Cultural Center (bottom right), and The Heritage at Millennium Park (upper right)

Buildings on Randolph include the following:

- City View Tower (720-726W)
- Randolph Place Lofts (~485W)
- Boeing International Headquarters (~450W)
- Franklin and Randolph Office Building (~250W)
- Randolph Tower (188W)
- Hotel Allegro (171W)
- Cadillac Palace Theatre (151W)
- Michael A. Bilandic Building (~150W)
- Chicago Title and Trust Center (~80W)
- James R. Thompson Center (100W)
- Richard J. Daley Center (55W)
- Nederlander Theatre (24-32W)
- Joffrey Tower (8E)
- FYE Superstore (formally Coconuts) (26E)
- The Heritage at Millennium Park (~50E)
- Smurfit-Stone Building (~90E)
- Millennium Park Plaza (~100E)
- One Prudential Plaza (130E)
- Two Prudential Plaza and Millennium Station (~150E)
- Aon Center (200E)
- Joan W. and Irving B. Harris Theater for Music and Dance (205E)
- McDonald's Cycle Center (239E)
- Blue Cross Blue Shield Tower (300E)
- Daley Bicentennial Plaza (337E)
- 340 on the Park (340E)
- The Buckingham (360E)
- Outer Drive East (400E)
- Harbor Point (155 N Harbor Dr.)

== See also ==
- Multilevel streets in Chicago
- E Randolph St.
- Randolph Street Market
