= Multilevel streets in Chicago =

Tiered streets

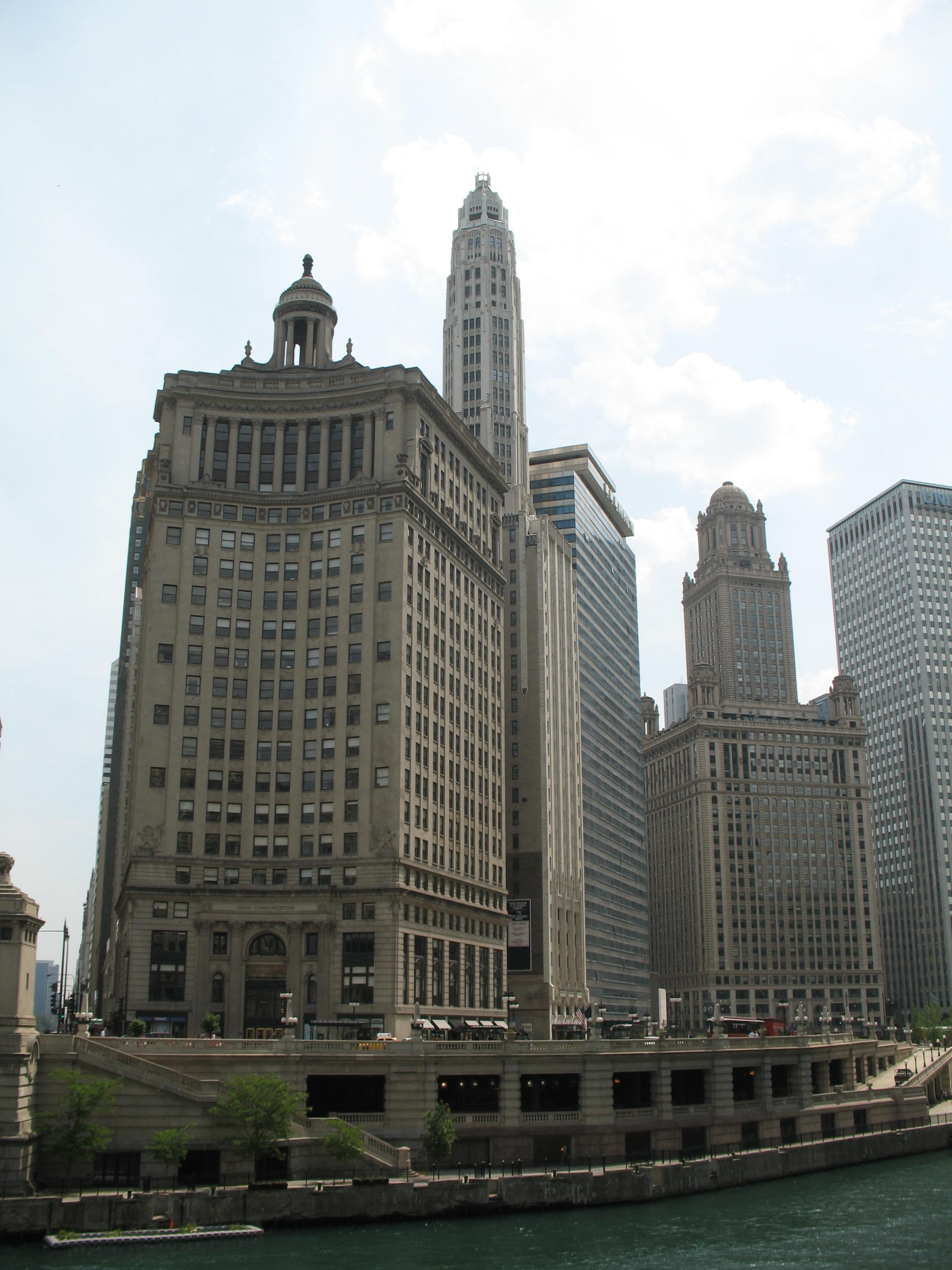
360 North Michigan, Mather Tower and 35 East Wacker stand on East Wacker Drive just west of Michigan Avenue and the Michigan Avenue Bridge.

Downtown Chicago, Illinois, has some double-decked and a few triple-decked streets immediately north and south of the Main Branch and immediately east of the South Branch of the Chicago River. The most famous and longest of these is Wacker Drive, which replaced the South Water Street Market upon its 1926 completion. The resulting bi-level street has an upper-level riverfront boulevard, a lower-level roadway for commercial and through traffic, and a recreational walkway at water level.

== History ==
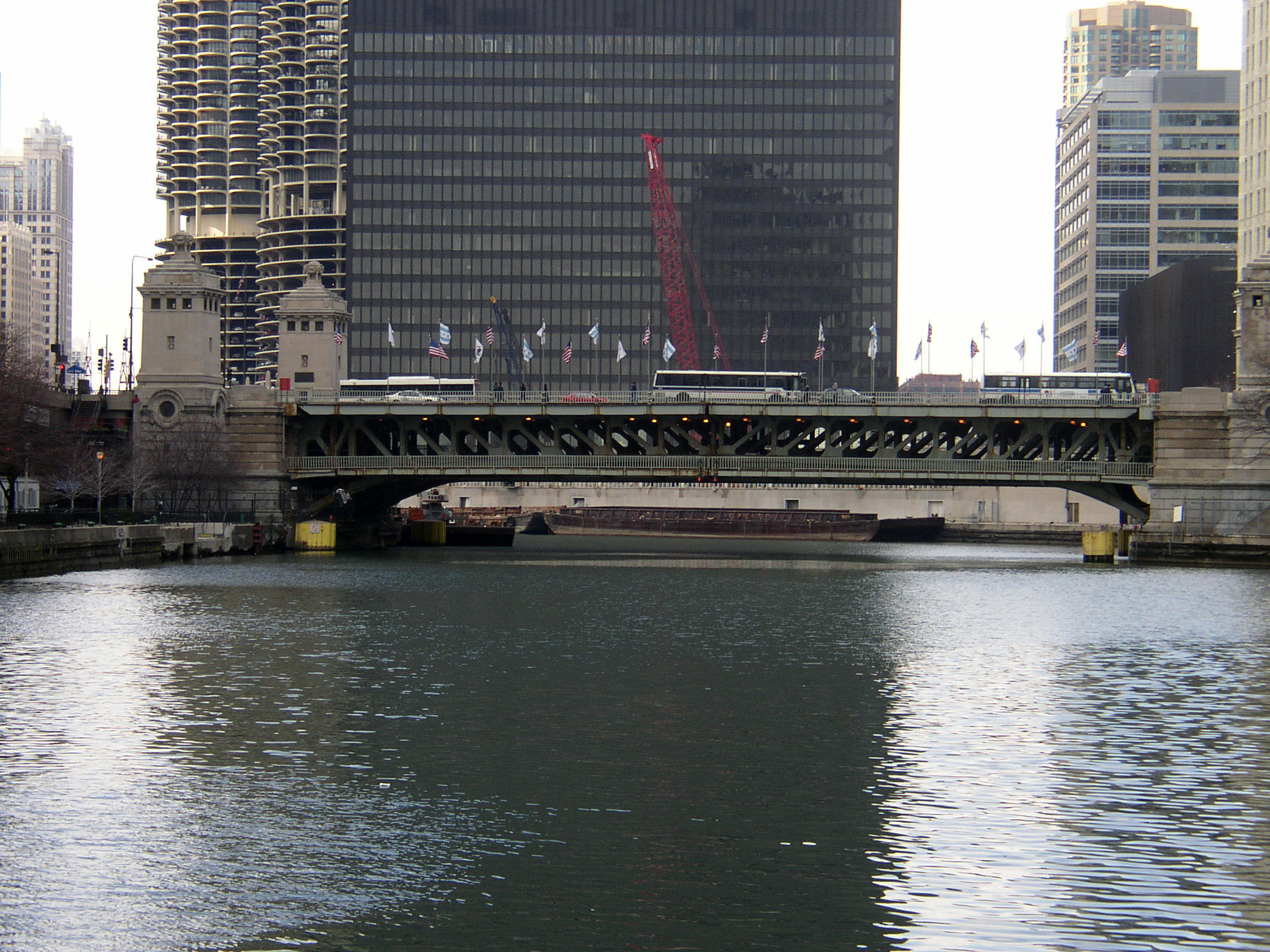
The Michigan Avenue Bridge crossing the Chicago River

The multilevel configuration arose from geography and traffic patterns in the Loop. In most other parts of the rest of the city near the Chicago River, only major streets crossed the river. However, most downtown streets crossed the river, and all of these crossings were bascule bridges, which required height clearances at the approaches to and over the river. Clearances were further necessitated due to the presence of many existing railroad tracks along the river (as in the west bank of the south branch) and tracks that ended at the river (such as the tracks ending at Randolph Street). Thus, a clearance zone was created along the river at locations that contained many closely spaced crossings. Many double-decked or triple-decked streets were created because they fell within this clearance zone.

This also created an anomaly not only in the layout and uses of streets, but also planning of buildings. Generally, the upper levels of the multi-level streets usually serve local traffic. The primary entrances of buildings are usually located on this level. The lower levels generally serve through-traffic and trucks serving businesses along the roads. This level houses the receiving/shipping entrances to the buildings on these streets. As a result, loading docks at street level are noticeably absent.

The first raising occurred from 1855 to 1858, when streets and buildings were raised between four and seven feet above their former elevation, just a few feet above lake level, where they were constantly muddy. The higher elevation allowed for sewers and proper drainage. However, this did not produce any two-level streets; the first of those was Michigan Avenue in the late 1910s. When the Illinois Center development was built on the east side of downtown, a new upper level was built, making most streets in that area three levels.

After about 1890, special interest groups, including recreational bicyclists, farmers delivering harvested crops to market, and motorists, began to mount support for concrete paving to replace the previously common dirt roads. Public road planning in Chicago began in 1910 when the Chicago Plan Commission was created to implement Daniel Burnham and Edward Bennett's plan.

The double-decked portion of Wabash Avenue north of the Chicago River was built in 1930, in conjunction with the single-level Wabash Avenue Bridge. On January 3, 2005, the upper and lower levels were closed at Kinzie Street for reconstruction (in conjunction with the Trump Tower Chicago development) but have since been reopened.

The city's famed Billy Goat Tavern, immortalized by John Belushi in a Saturday Night Live sketch as the Olympia Cafe, is located on the lower level of Michigan Avenue.

== List of streets ==
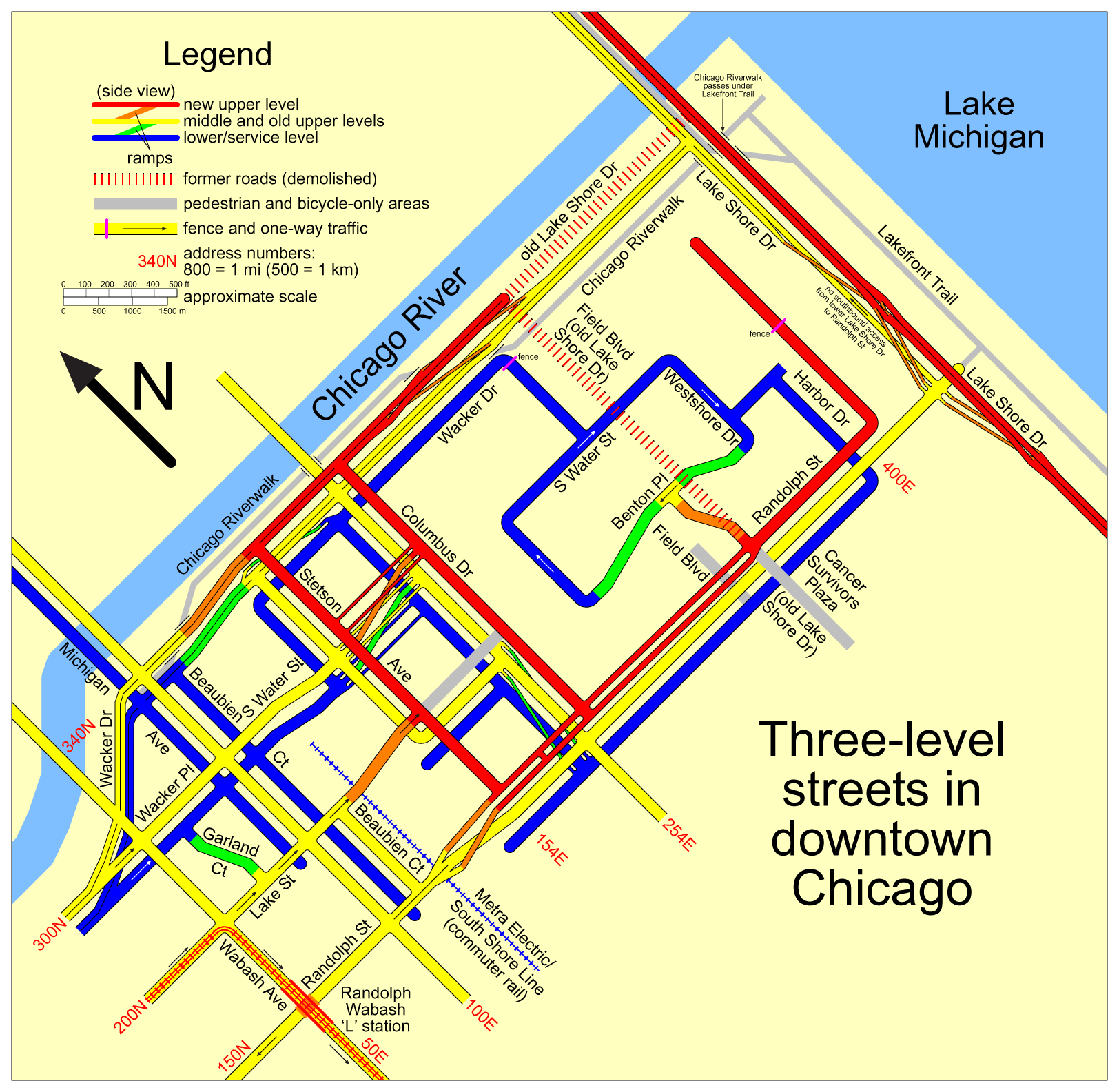
A map of many of the streets

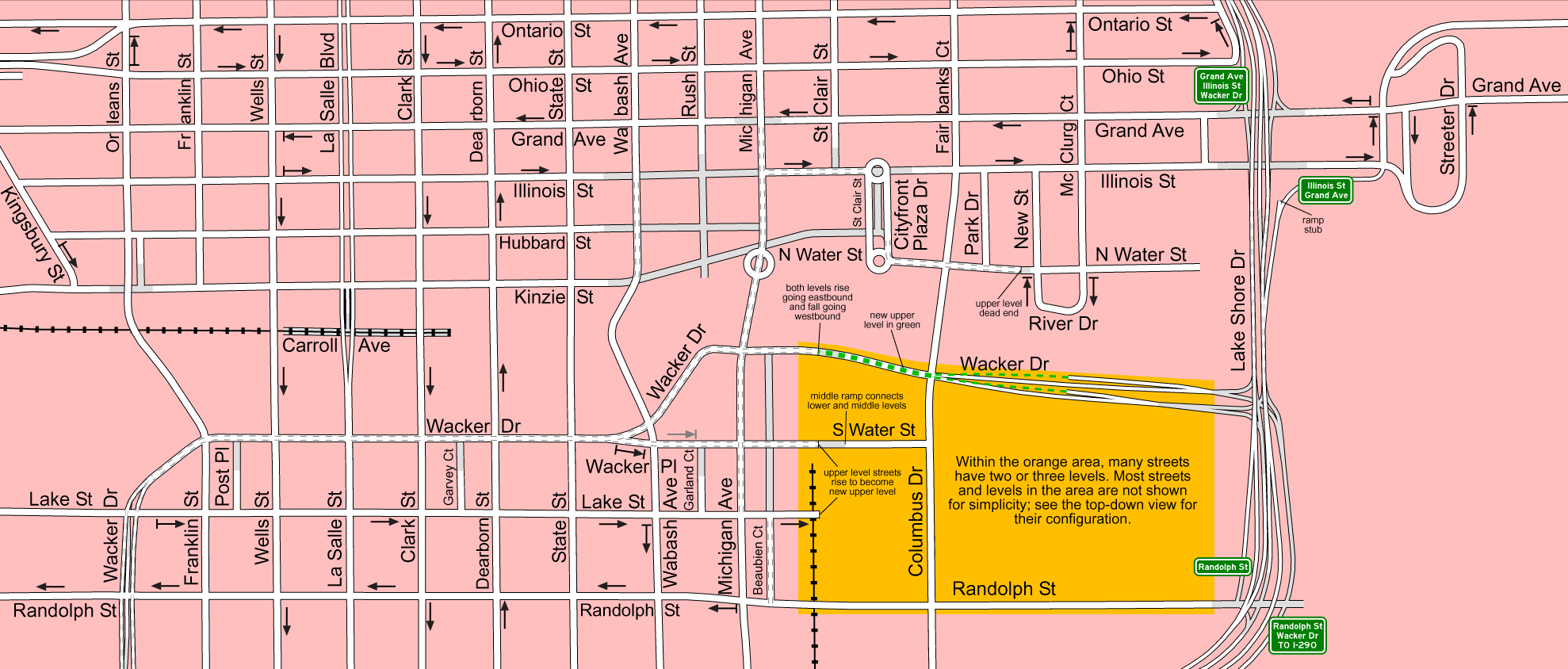
A map of the rest of the streets

The following streets have double- or triple-decker sections:

- Beaubien Court
- Columbus Drive (triple decker: they are (in descending order) Columbus Drive, Lower Columbus Drive, and Columbus Service Drive)
- Field Boulevard
- Harbor Drive
- Illinois Street
- Lake Shore Drive (including a double-decker bridge over the Chicago River)
- La Salle Drive
- Michigan Avenue (including a double-decker bridge over the Chicago River)
- Randolph Street (triple decker)
- Stetson Avenue (triple decker: Stetson Ave, Lower Stetson Ave, and Stetson Service Ave)
- Wabash Avenue
- Wacker Drive (triple decker: Wacker Drive, Lower Wacker Drive, and Wacker Service Drive or Sub Lower Wacker Drive or Lower Lower Wacker Drive)
- Wacker Place
- North Water Street
- South Water Street (triple decker: South Water St, Lower South Water St, and South Water Service St)

The McCormick Place Busway connects the southerly convention center to the northerly lower level street grid.

== See also ==
- Roads and freeways in Chicago
- Underground Atlanta, a similar bi-level system
