= Wacker Drive =

Major street in Chicago, Illinois

Coordinates: 41.88688°N 87.62738°W

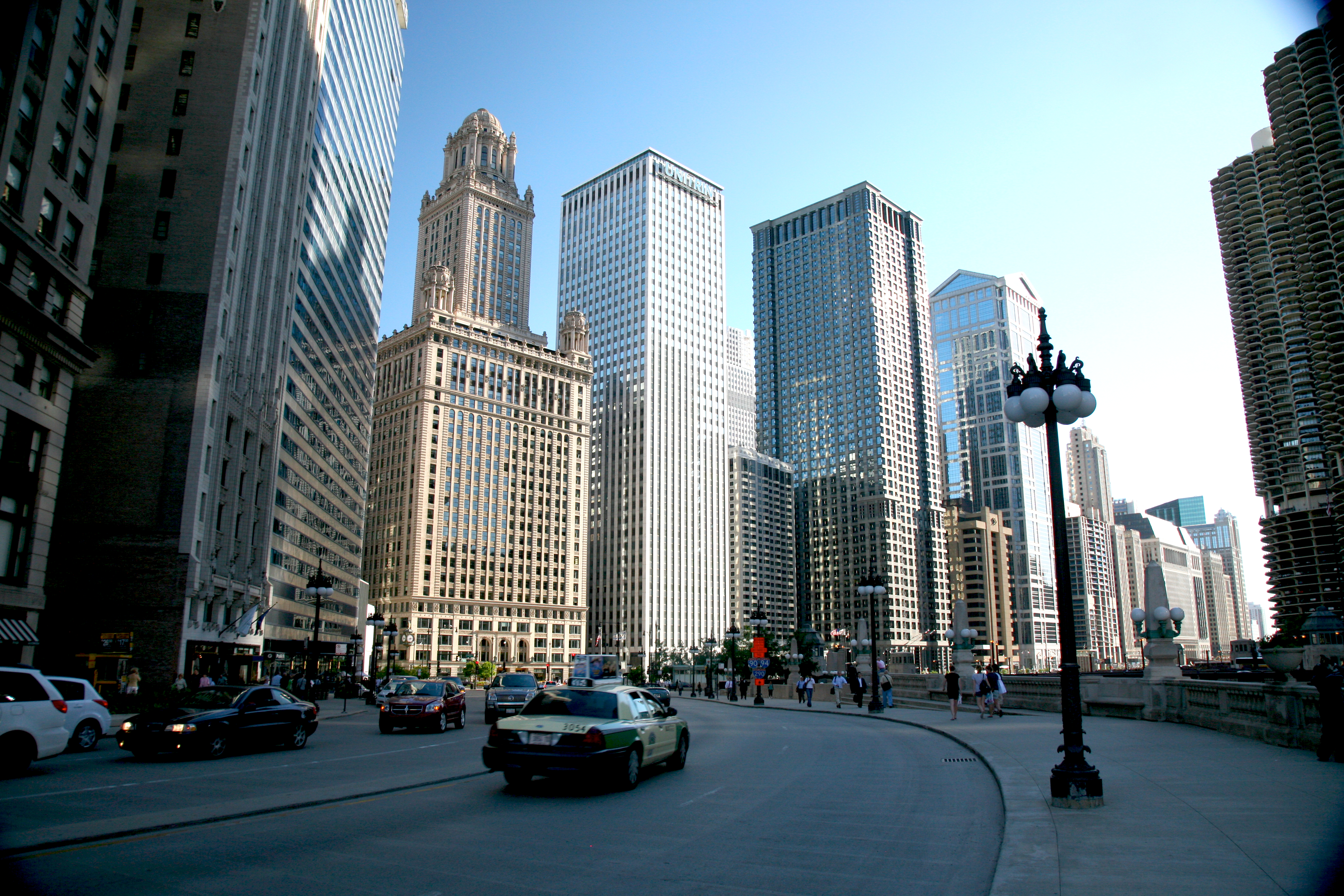
- Upper Wacker Drive, looking west from Michigan Avenue
- Wacker Drive highlighted in red
- Former names: Market Street; South Water Street; River Street
- Length: 2.2 mi (3.5 km)
- South end: Upper Wacker: Franklin Street/Harrison Street intersection (360 west at 424 south); Lower Wacker: Ida B. Wells Drive near Wells Street (220 west at 400 south)
- East end: US 41 (Lake Shore Drive) (340 north at 400 east)

Construction
- Inauguration: 1926

Wacker Drive is a multilevel street in Chicago, Illinois, running along the south bank of the main branch and the east bank of the south branch of the Chicago River through the Chicago Loop. Much of the roadway is double-decked: the upper level carries regular vehicular traffic, while Lower Wacker Drive accommodates service vehicles, including delivery trucks, waste collection, and utility access.

Because the street follows the curved course of the Chicago River, Lower Wacker Drive is the only roadway in the city that carries both north–south and east–west address designations. (Note: The western portion of the street is called North Wacker Drive and South Wacker Drive, while the northern portion is called West Wacker Drive and East Wacker Drive.) In certain sections there is a third level, sometimes referred to as Lower Lower Wacker Drive or Sub-Lower Wacker Drive. This level is primarily used for vehicle towing and impound operations, utility infrastructure, and railroad maintenance access.

Wacker Drive is named for early-20th-century Chicago businessman and city planner Charles H. Wacker.

== Route description ==
Wacker Drive begins at the intersection of Harrison and Franklin streets. This intersection is located to the north of the site of the former Grand Central Station. Immediately north of Ida B. Wells Drive, Wacker Drive splits into Lower and Upper Wacker drives; however, there is no direct access from Harrison Street to the upper level. Lower Wacker Drive serves as a limited-access road, while Upper Wacker Drive serves downtown streets. North of Lake Street, the road curves to the east, running adjacent from the south branch to the main stem of the Chicago River. East of Columbus Drive, the upper level rejoins with the lower level en route to Lake Shore Drive, but the upper level continues east toward St. Regis Chicago.

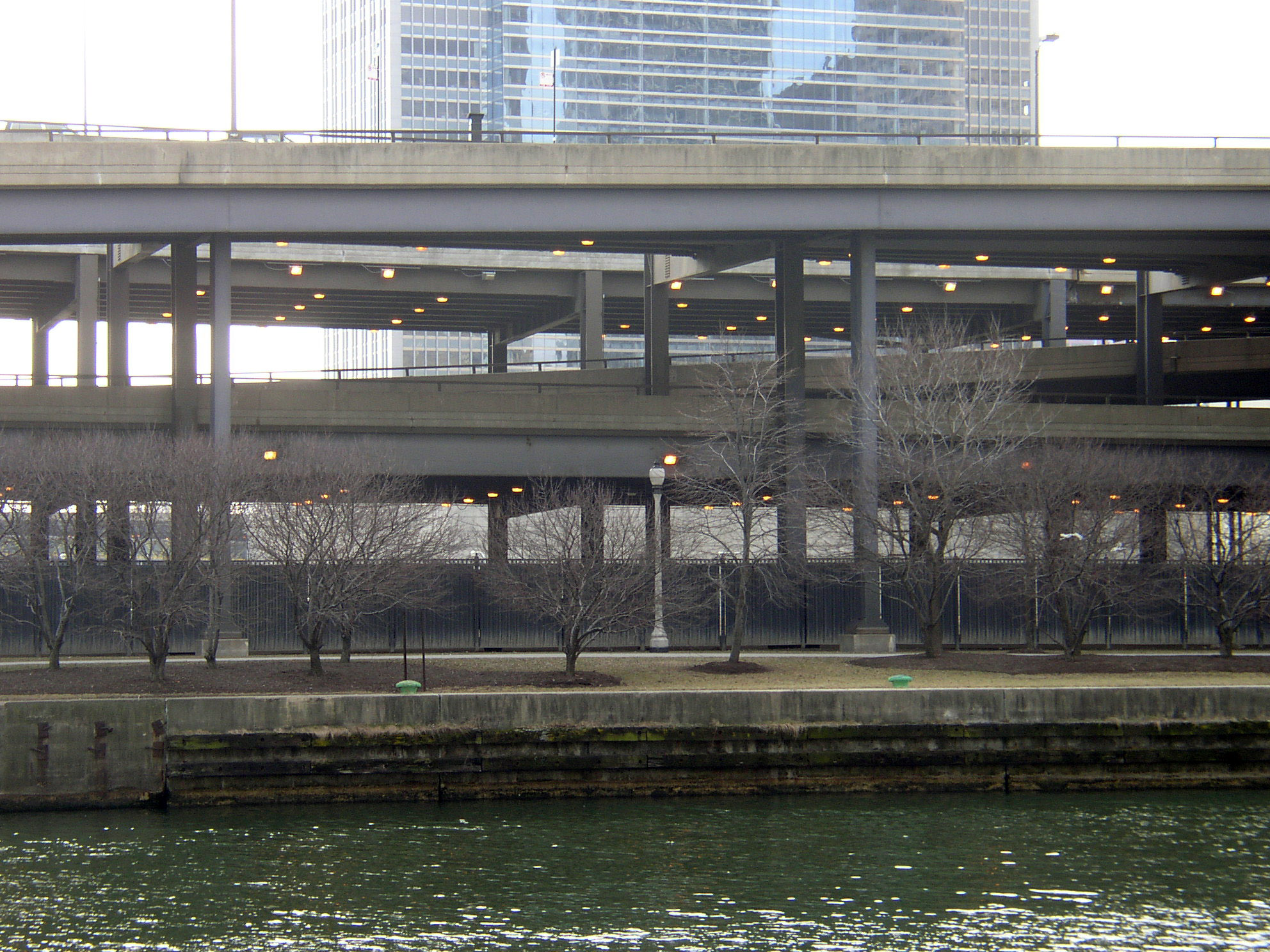
All three levels of Wacker Drive, east of Columbus Drive, including a ramp between the upper and lower (middle) levels

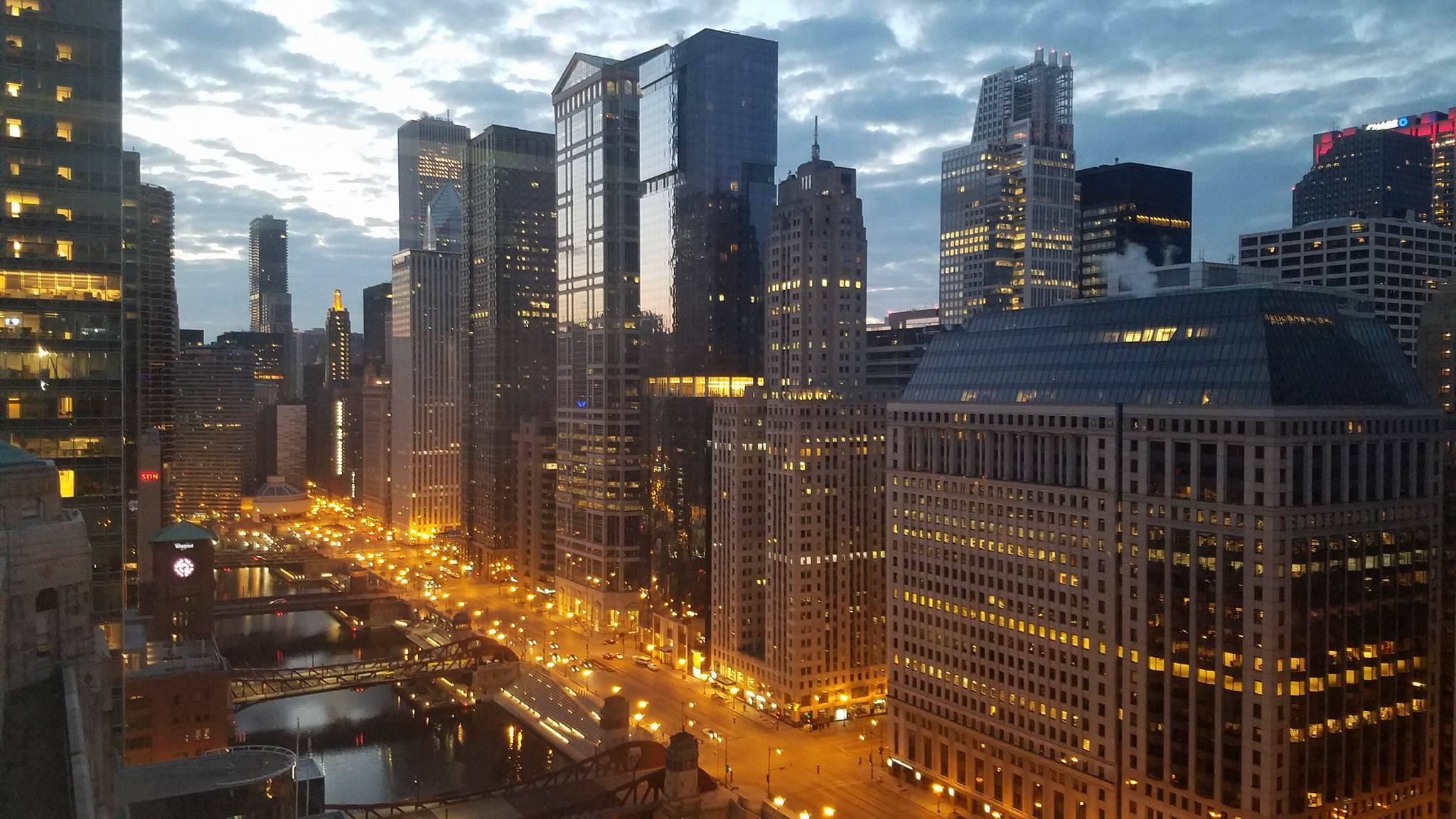
A view of Wacker Drive and the Chicago River looking east from Merchandise Mart in February 2017

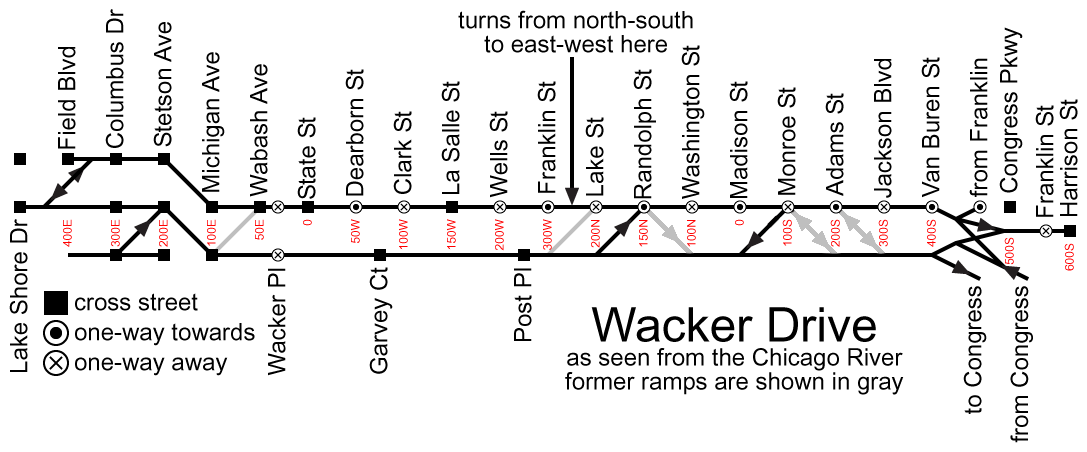
A side view, as seen from the Chicago River

== History ==
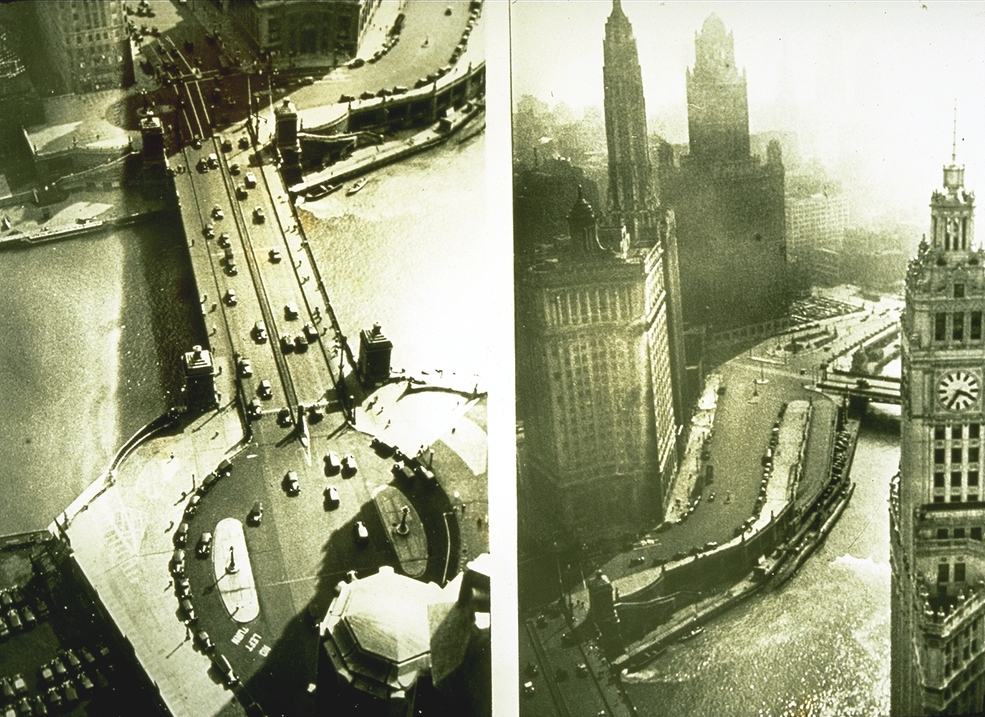
Two aerial views in 1926

In 1909, architects Daniel Burnham and Edward H. Bennett drew up a plan for the Commercial Club of Chicago to unify the city's urban design and increase its physical beautification. The improvement of traffic flow in Chicago was a major part of the plan. Among its many recommendations was a double-decked roadway along the river, intended to relieve the congestion at River Street and Rush Street, where 50% of the city's north–south traffic crossed the Chicago River. Charles H. Wacker, chairman of the Chicago Plan Commission, pushed the idea.

The original double-decker road, replacing South Water and River Streets, was completed in 1926 at a cost of $8 million and named after Charles Wacker. The 1926 section stretched from Lake Street to Michigan Avenue, the latter of which was also rebuilt into a two-level road.

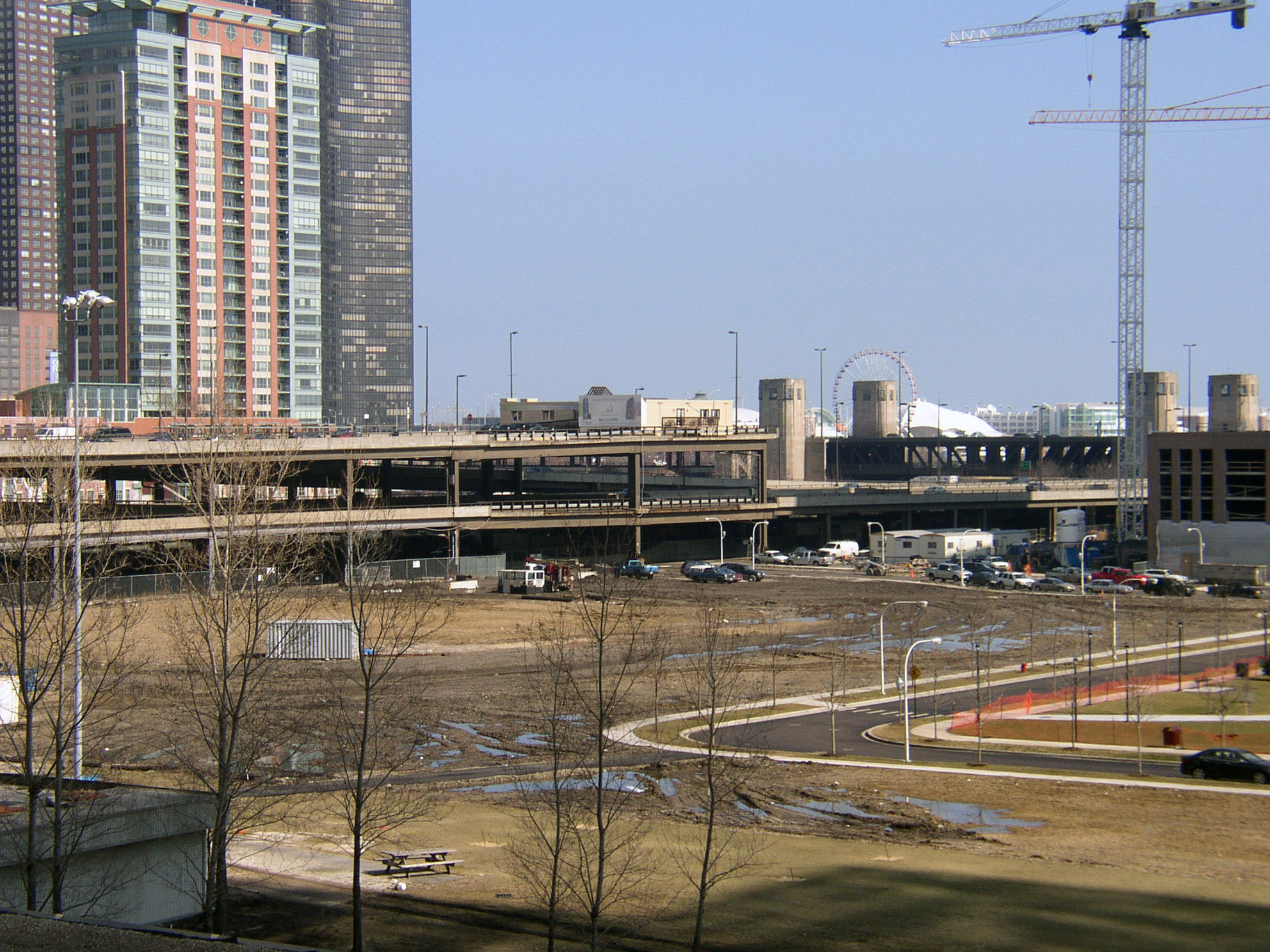
Triple-decker section of Wacker Drive; the middle level continues east toward Lake Shore Drive

An extension south to Congress Parkway and Harrison Street was built between 1948 and 1954, replacing Market Street (after the Market Street stub of the Lake Street Elevated was removed). Extensions east were built in 1963 and 1975, with the latter taking it to Lake Shore Drive, and a new lower level starting at Stetson Avenue. At the time, Lake Shore Drive had an S-curve at the river, running where Wacker now goes between Field Boulevard and current Lake Shore Drive. This S-curve was on a viaduct over the Illinois Central Railroad's rail yard, and was at the level of Upper Wacker; the middle and lower levels dead-ended at that point. The current alignment of Lake Shore Drive was finished in 1986, and in 1987 Middle Wacker was extended to meet the new alignment. The ramps to bring upper traffic down had already been built; upper has been dead-ended where it used to end at Lake Shore Drive.

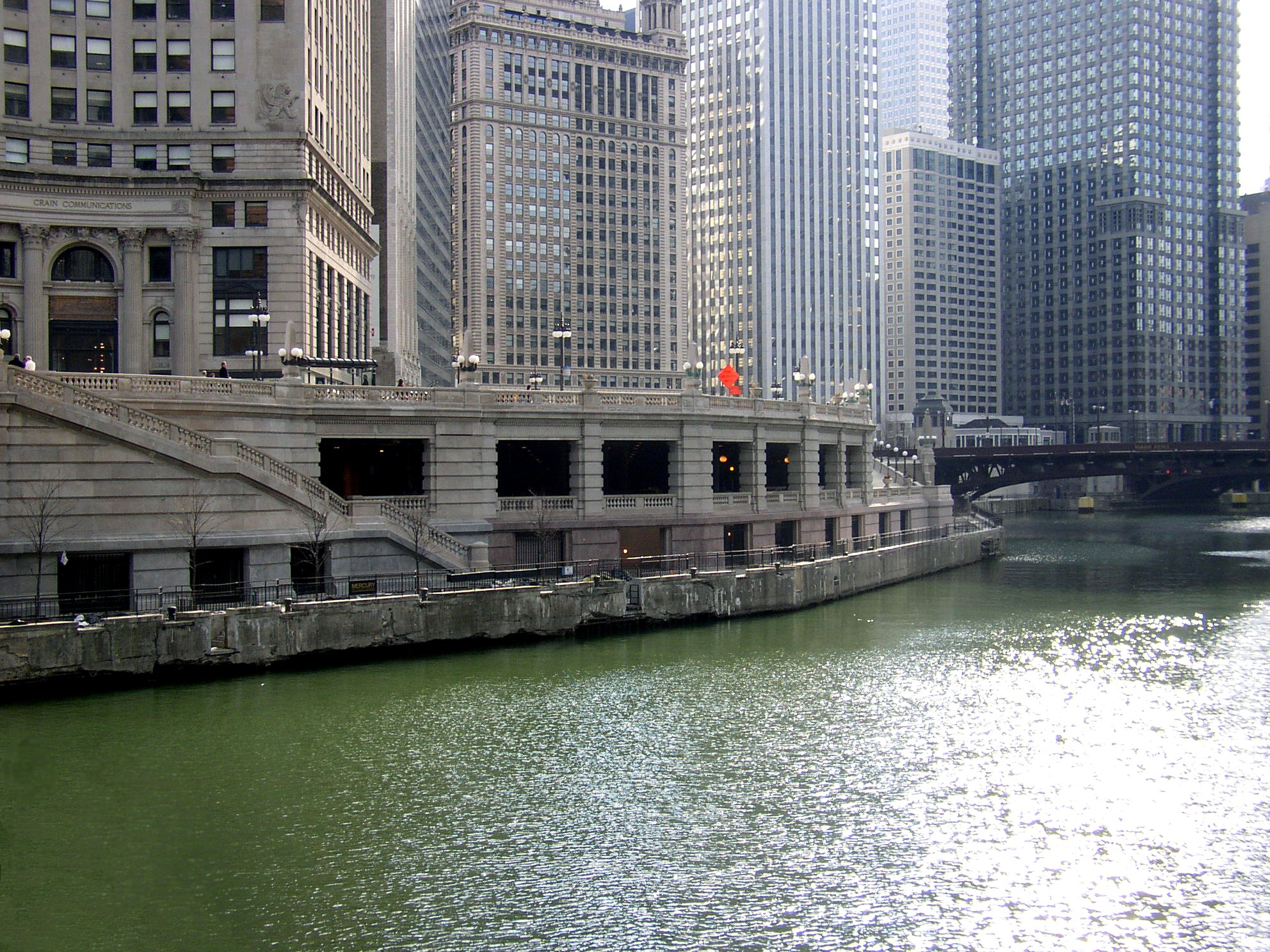
Wacker Drive in downtown Chicago

In 2001–2002, Wacker Drive was redesigned and reconstructed between Michigan Avenue and Lake Street. The original upper deck was crumbling, and the entire roadway did not meet modern standards for road widths and clearances. Using a specially developed post-tensioned, reinforced, high-performance concrete cast-in-place system, the new road deck was expected to have a lifespan of 75–100 years. Walkways along the river were meant to make the drive more pedestrian-friendly, while restoration of historic limestone elements and reproduction lighting evoked the drive's original 1926 appearance. The 20-month, $200-million project was completed on time and within budget.

In spring of 2010, work commenced on rebuilding the north–south section of Wacker, from Randolph Street to Congress Parkway, including the upper and lower levels. This is a continuation of the Revive Wacker Drive project started in 2001.

Wacker is the only street to intersect both State Street (the east–west center line) and Madison Street (the north–south center line), although Lake Shore Drive and LaSalle Street/Drive also each cross both dividing lines.

In April 2014, The American Council of Engineering Companies awarded the Wacker Drive and Congress Parkway Reconstruction project its Grand Conceptor Award. The project team was led by TranSystems and included roadway, bridge and tunnel improvement work. The project involved complex staging to keep 135,000 vehicles and 150,000 pedestrians moving through the construction zone each day.

== Intersections ==
The following streets intersect Upper Wacker Drive, from south to north and west to east. Most upper-level streets that end at Wacker Drive, with only right turns allowed, are not included.

The entire route is in Chicago, Cook County.

mi	km	Destinations	Notes
0.0	0.0	Harrison Street (600 South) / Franklin Street (300 West)	Southern terminus; no access to Upper Wacker northbound
0.2	0.32	Ida B. Wells Drive	Northbound entrance only
0.2	0.32	Van Buren Street (400 South)	
0.3	0.48	Jackson Boulevard (300 South)	
0.4	0.64	Adams Street (200 South)	
0.5	0.80	Monroe Street (100 South)	Intersection is with Upper Wacker Drive and formerly had entrances and exits to and from northbound and southbound Lower Wacker Drive; currently only has an entrance to northbound Lower Wacker Drive
0.5	0.80	Madison Street (0 North/South)	
0.6	0.97	Washington Street (100 North)	
0.7	1.1	Randolph Street (150 North)	
0.8	1.3	Lake Street	No access to Lake Street westbound from Upper Wacker Drive northbound
0.9	1.4	Franklin Street (300 West)	
1.0	1.6	Wells Street (200 West)	
1.1	1.8	LaSalle Street (140 West)	
1.2	1.9	Clark Street (100 West)	
1.2	1.9	Dearborn Street (36 West)	
1.3	2.1	State Street (0 East/West)	
1.3	2.1	Wacker Place	Eastbound exit only
1.4	2.3	Wabash Avenue (44 East)	
1.5	2.4	Michigan Avenue (100 East)	No access to Upper Wacker Drive westbound from Michigan Street northbound or Upper Wacker eastbound from Michigan northbound
1.6	2.6	Stetson Avenue	
1.7	2.7	Stetson Avenue	
1.7	2.7	Columbus Drive	
1.9	3.1	St. Regis Chicago	Eastern terminus
1.000 mi = 1.609 km; 1.000 km = 0.621 mi: Incomplete access

The following streets intersect Lower Wacker Drive, from south to north and west to east.

The entire route is in Chicago, Cook County.

mi	km	Destinations	Notes
0.0	0.0	Harrison Street (600 South) / Franklin Street (300 West)	Southern terminus
0.1	0.16	Ida B. Wells Drive	Northbound entrance and southbound exit
0.9	1.4	Post Place	
1.2	1.9	Garvey Court	
1.3	2.1	Wacker Place	Eastbound exit only
1.5	2.4	Michigan Avenue (100 East)	
1.5	2.4	Beaubien Court	Eastbound entrance and exit only
1.6	2.6	Stetson Avenue	
1.7	2.7	Columbus Drive	
2.0	3.2	US 41 (Lake Shore Drive)	
1.000 mi = 1.609 km; 1.000 km = 0.621 mi: Incomplete access

== In popular media ==
- The 1980 film The Blues Brothers used Wacker Drive as a setting.
- The car chase scene in The Dark Knight (2008) was filmed on Lower Wacker Drive.
- The music video for "Burnin' " pays tribute to Chicago house producers that Daft Punk found inspiration in.

== See also ==
- Multilevel streets in Chicago
- Philo Carpenter
- Buildings on Wacker Drive
  - Blue Cross-Blue Shield Building
  - Civic Opera House
  - One South Wacker
  - 111 South Wacker Drive
  - 200 South Wacker Drive
  - Willis Tower
  - 311 South Wacker Drive
  - 333 Wacker Drive
  - 225 West Wacker Drive
