= Ida B. Wells Drive =

Street in Chicago, Illinois

- 5th Street; 500 South
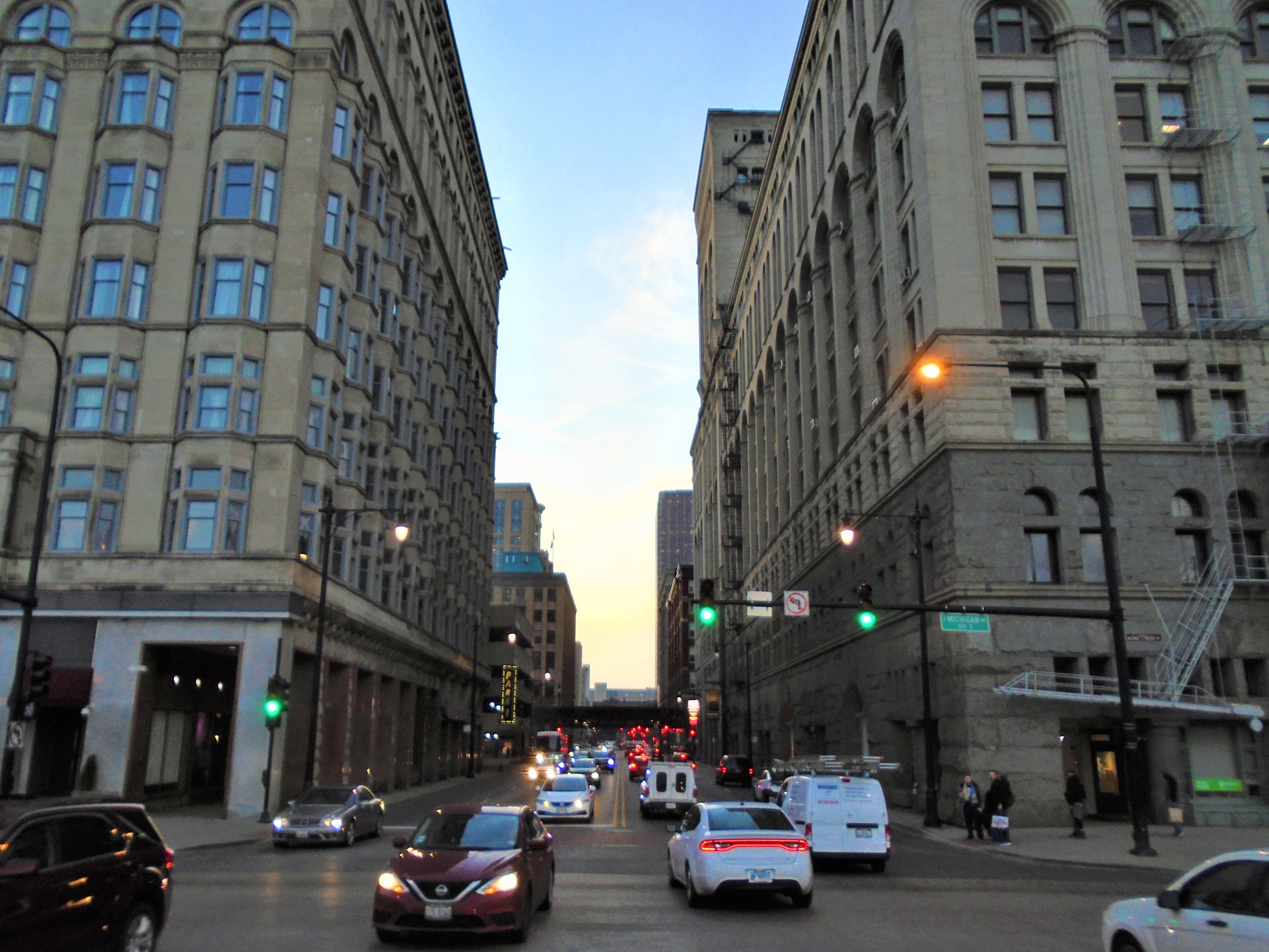
- Ida B. Wells Drive, looking west at Michigan Avenue
- Ida B. Wells Drive highlighted in red
- Length: 1.12 mi (1.80 km)
- Location: Chicago
- West end: I-90 / I-94 / I-290 / IL 110 (CKC) in Chicago
- East end: Columbus Drive in Chicago

Ida B. Wells Drive (formerly Congress Parkway) is a major east–west street in downtown Chicago, Illinois, United States. It runs east from the Jane Byrne Interchange, where it meets Interstate 90 (I-90), I-94 and I-290. At Wells Street, Ida B. Wells Drive continues as a surface street past State Street and Michigan Avenue, until ending at Columbus Drive in Grant Park in front of the Buckingham Fountain. In 2018, the street was renamed by the city government to honor the journalist and civil rights activist Ida B. Wells.

== Route description ==
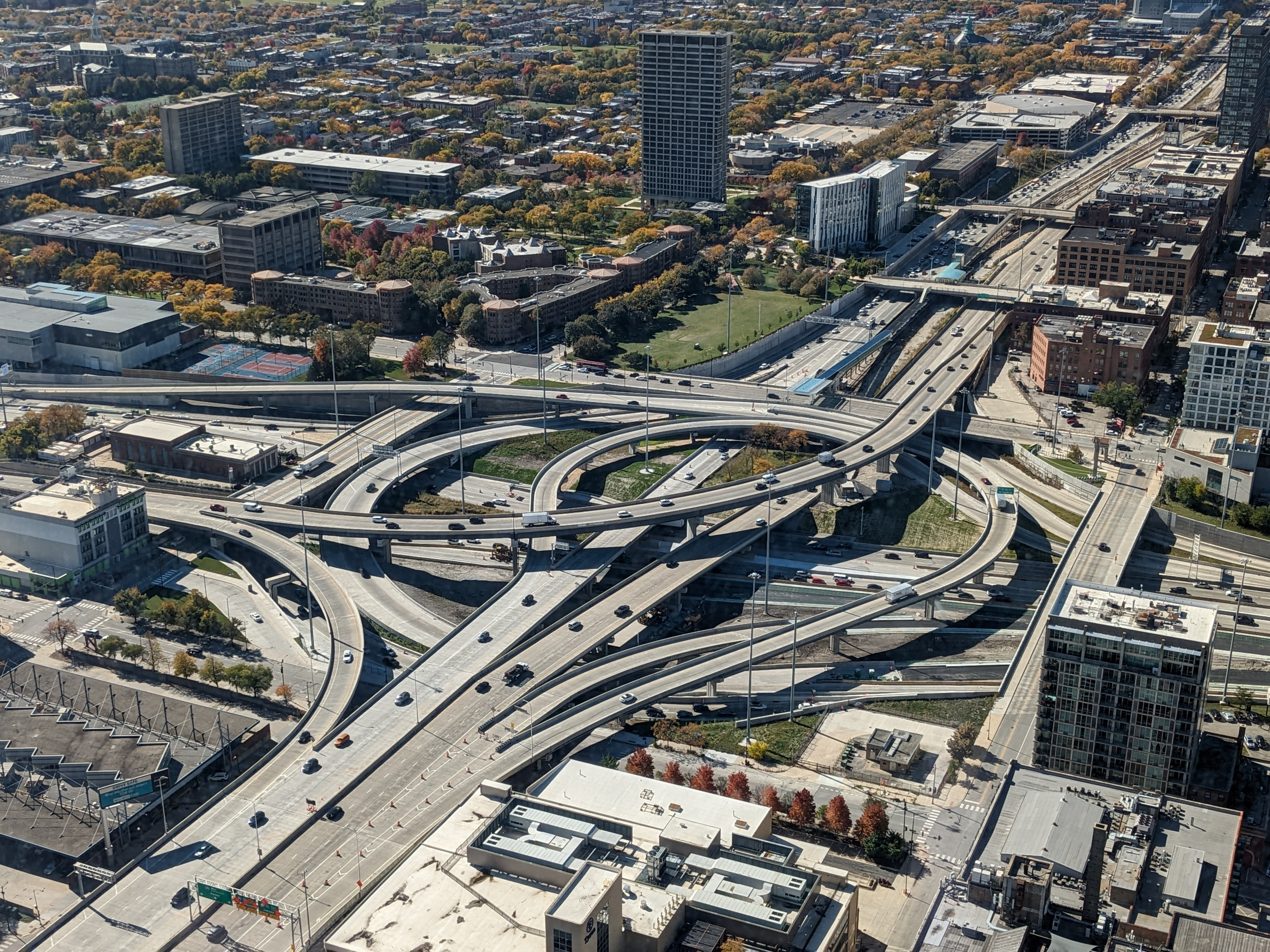
The Jane Byrne Interchange at the west end of Ida B. Wells Drive (lower left), looking toward the west-southwest. The Eisenhower Expressway continues upper-right.

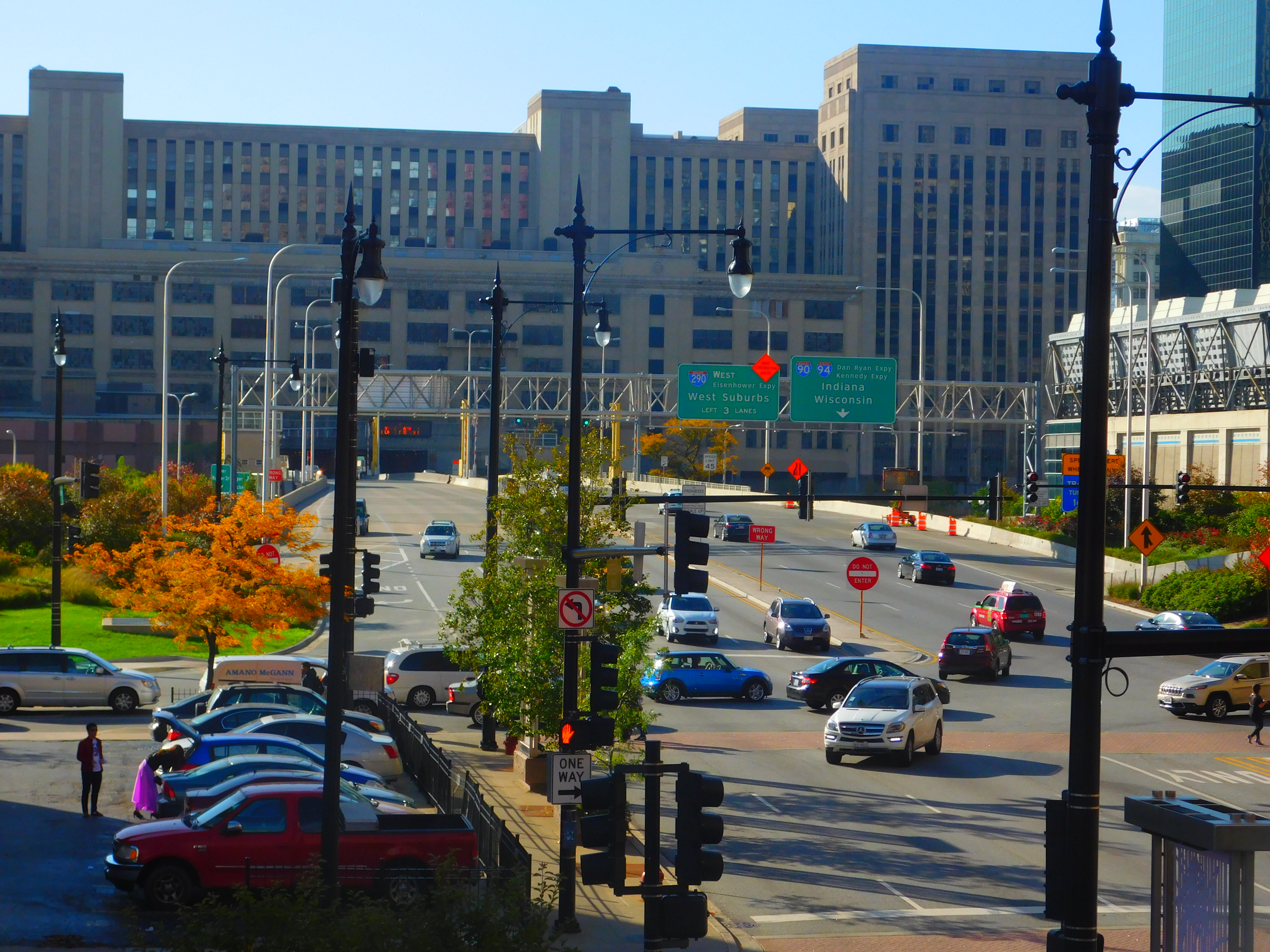
Ida B. Wells Drive, approaching the bridge over the river and under-tunnel at the Old Main Post Office

Ida B. Wells Drive begins at the Jane Byrne Interchange, where it intersects the Kennedy, Dan Ryan and Eisenhower expressways. After passing through the interchange, the Drive passes under the Old Chicago Main Post Office, then over the South Branch of the Chicago River. At an interchange with Franklin Street and Wacker Drive, Ida B. Wells Drive changes from a freeway to a surface street. It then crosses north–south streets in downtown, including Wells Street (thus creating an intersection of Wells and Wells), LaSalle Street, Clark Street, State Street and Michigan Avenue. At Michigan Avenue, Ida B. Wells Drive enters Grant Park, where it ends at Columbus Drive, just west of Buckingham Fountain.

West of the Jane Byrne Interchange, Congress Parkway still exists in several disjointed segments, serving as a frontage road for parts of the Eisenhower Expressway, and as a minor street through several West Side neighborhoods. In the western Cook County suburbs of Chicago, it is known as Congress Street.

== History ==
Ida B. Wells Drive, formerly called Congress Parkway, was proposed in the 1909 Plan of Chicago as the central axis of the replanned city. The plan's authors, Daniel Burnham and Edward H. Bennett, proposed a broad new boulevard on the line of Congress Street that would cut through the long blocks between Van Buren and Harrison Streets, connecting a cultural center of new buildings in Grant Park to a new civic center centered on Congress and Halsted Street, then extending westward to parks and suburban areas beyond the city limits. Downtown, Congress Street was only two-blocks-long, platted in 1848 as 5th street, which ran from State Street east to Michigan Avenue.

In the late 1920s, the U.S. Post Office Department chose a site for Chicago's main post office that would block any future such boulevard. Bennett and the Chicago Plan Commission objected. Finally a compromise was reached that left an underpass-tunnel through the building, completed in 1933.

As planning for Chicago-area superhighways advanced in the 1920s, a route through the West Side was a high priority. When planners seemed to lean toward a Monroe Street alignment, Bennett published a 1929 study arguing the superiority of Congress Street. After an extensive study of alternatives, a Congress Street alignment was included in the city's 1940 Comprehensive Superhighway Plan.

During the 1930s, Chicago's plans for rapid transit became intertwined with plans for superhighways. When the Public Works Administration approved a grant for the city's downtown subways, it was conditioned on construction of the downtown portion of Congress Parkway. Chicago's "Subway Route No. 2" was being planned for a route under Milwaukee Avenue and Dearborn Street, turning westward under Congress Parkway, with a future extension westward anticipated.

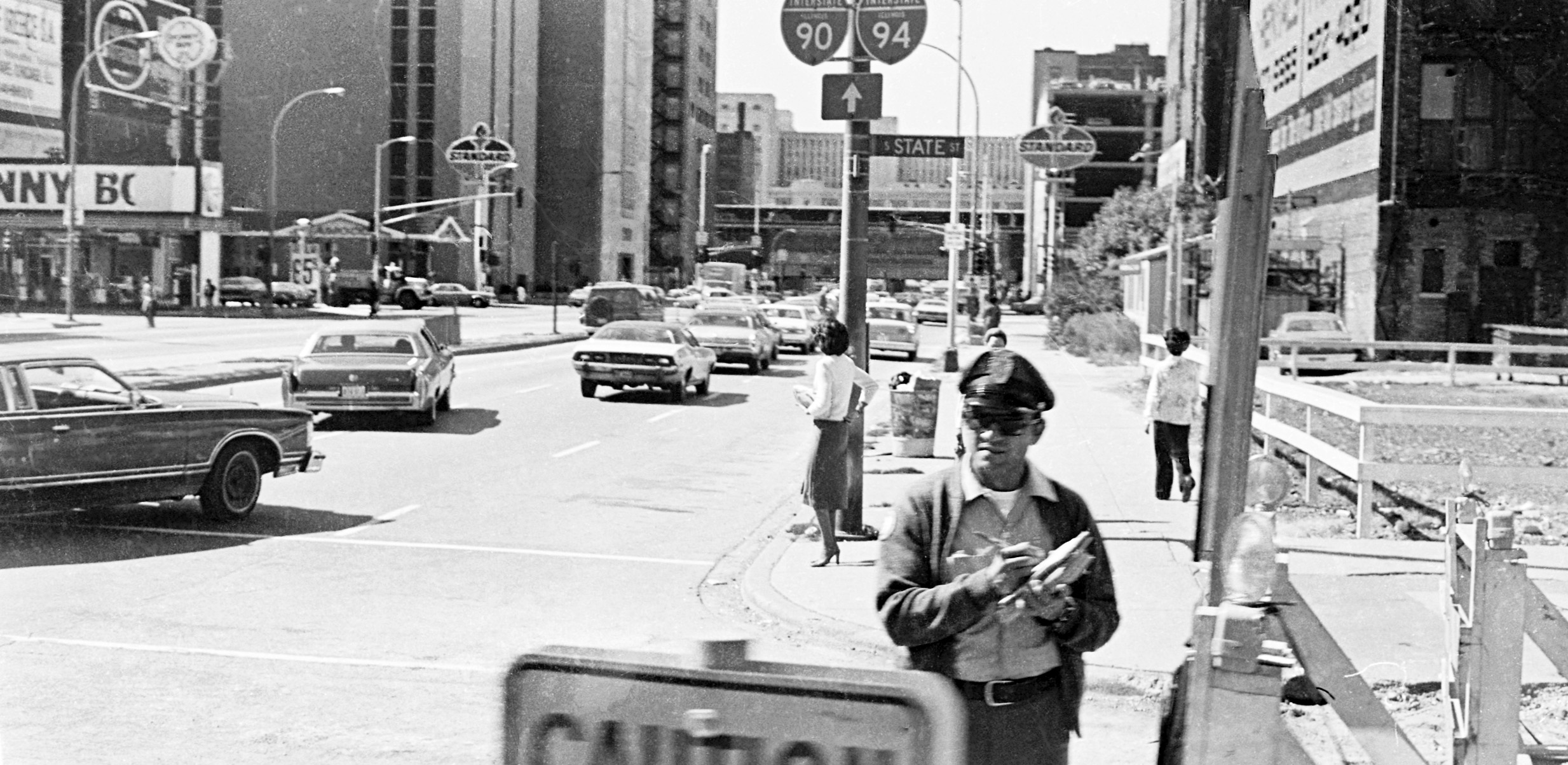
Congress Parkway at State St., 1978

Construction of the downtown section, which began in December 1949, presented several challenges. The new superhighway had to be carried above Clinton and Canal and Streets, through the Post Office at a level similar to surrounding streets, and across the South Branch of the Chicago River on twin bascule-type drawbridges. East of the river, ramps connected to Franklin Street and two levels of Wacker Drive before the end of controlled access at Wells Street. The platforms of LaSalle Street Station required new supports for creation of an underpass for Congress Parkway. More than two dozen buildings were cleared for the new street, including the 13-story Monon and 12-story Caxton Buildings on Dearborn Street, part of Printer's Row. East of State Street, arcaded sidewalks were cut into existing buildings, including the Auditorium Theater, to allow six lanes of auto traffic.

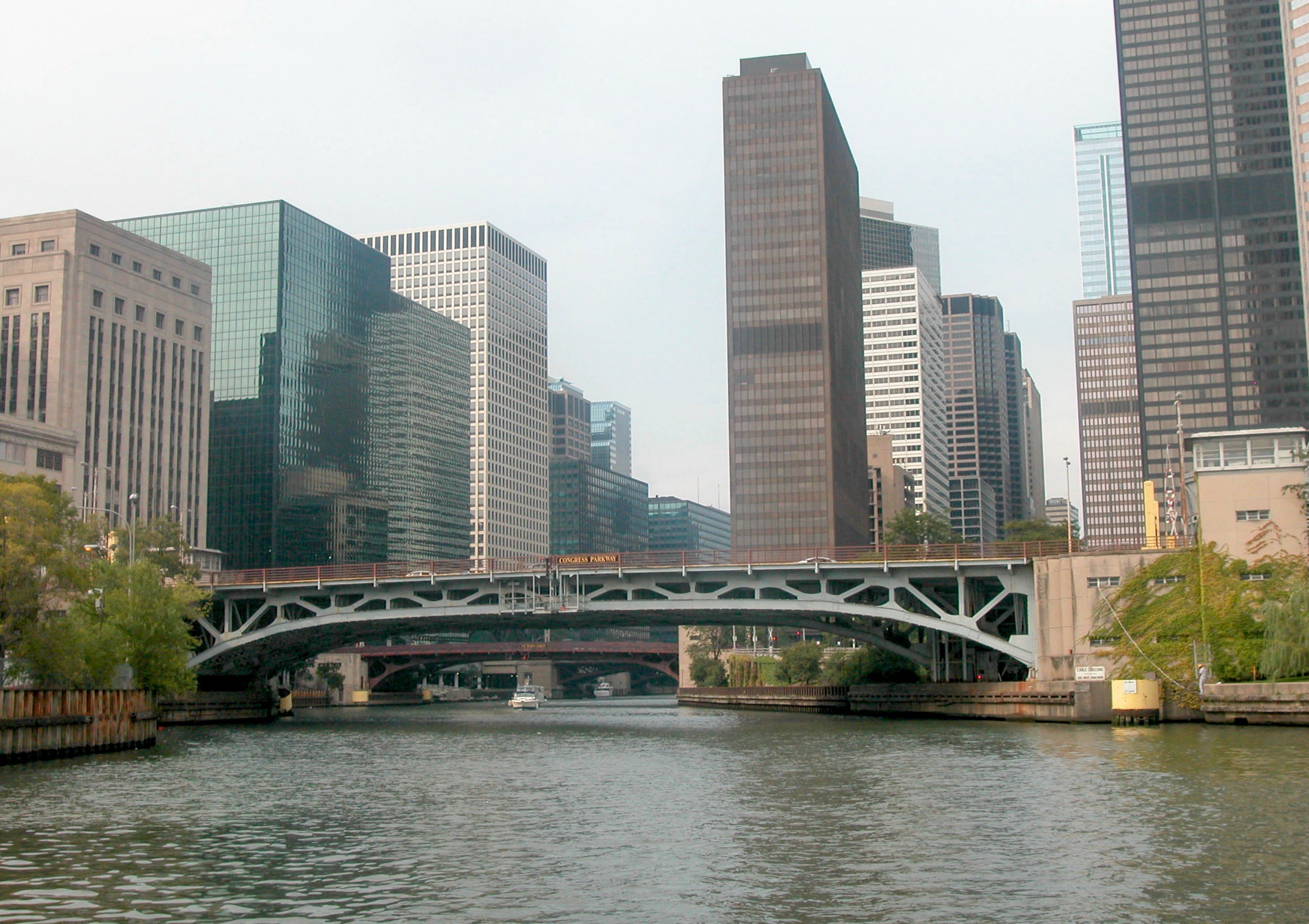
The bridge that carries Ida B. Wells Drive over the Chicago River in 2006

The new street opened for traffic from State Street to LaSalle Street in 1952, with the full length opened August 10, 1956. A ceremonial stairway into Grant Park was altered to allow the new street to reach Columbus Drive. Plans for ramps under Buckingham Fountain to connect the new street to Lake Shore Drive were never carried out. Before I-290 was named the Dwight D. Eisenhower Expressway in the 1960s, it was called the Congress Expressway, because its eastern end was joined to Congress Parkway.

Rather than a new central axis for an expanded business district, the wide, heavily trafficked new street came to represent the southern boundary of the Loop. Small parcels cleared for construction but not needed for the street itself became gas stations and small parking lots. As Printers Row was redeveloped into residential buildings during the 1970s and 1980s, Congress Parkway came to be seen as a boundary between the office and residential districts.

When Chicago's new Harold Washington Library opened in October 1991 at State Street and Congress Parkway, it turned attention again to Ida B. Wells Drive's role as a civic gateway. A streetscaping project opened in 2013 used lighted median columns and sidewalk trellises to create an "electronic streetscape", whose changing colors are a reminder of Buckingham Fountain at the street's eastern end. A 2012 reconstruction of the south end of Wacker Drive added extensive landscaping around and over the ramps that connect with Congress Parkway at Franklin Street.

On July 25, 2018, the Chicago City Council renamed the street, which had been called Congress Parkway, Ida B. Wells Drive in honor of the civil rights activist Ida B. Wells; it is the first downtown Chicago street named for a woman of color. The name change did not affect roadway west of the expressway interchange. The editorial board of The New York Times praised the Chicago City Council's renaming of the street. Street signs with the new name officially went up on February 11, 2019.

== Public transportation ==
CTA Blue Line stations LaSalle Street to Forest Park are near Ida B. Wells Drive.

== Junction list ==
The entire route is in Chicago, Cook County. All exits are unnumbered.

mi	km	Destinations	Notes
0.00	0.00	I-290 west / IL 110 (CKC) west (Eisenhower Expressway) – Aurora	Continuation beyond I-90/I-94
0.00	0.00	I-90 west / I-94 west (Kennedy Expressway) – Wisconsin I-90 east / I-94 east (Dan Ryan Expressway) – Indiana	Jane Byrne Interchange; I-94 exit 51I
0.05– 0.08	0.080– 0.13	Canal Street	Eastbound exit and westbound entrance
0.42	0.68	Wacker Drive, Franklin Street	Eastbound exit and westbound entrance; east end of freeway section
1.12	1.80	Columbus Drive	T-intersection; eastern terminus
1.000 mi = 1.609 km; 1.000 km = 0.621 mi: Incomplete access
