= John C. Lahey =

American architect

John Lahey
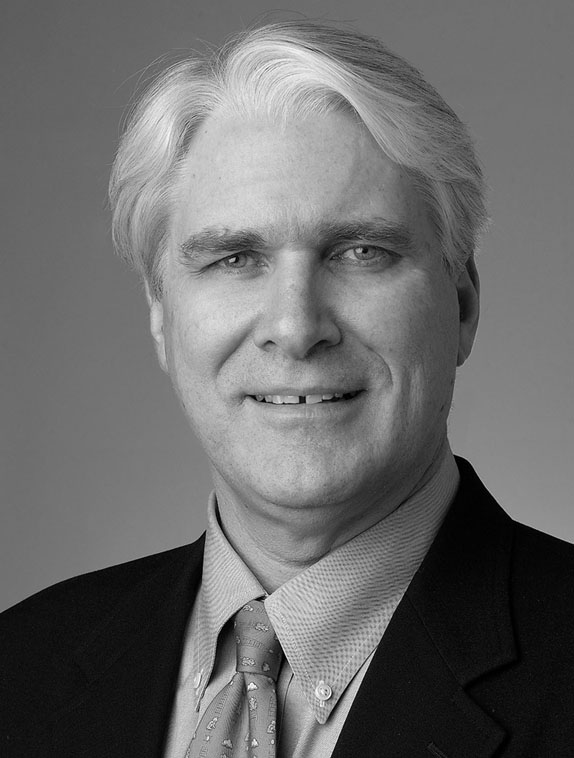
- Lahey in 2010 (or earlier)
- Born: April 13, 1953 (age 71); Flushing, Queens, U.S.
- Occupation: Architect
- Practice: Solomon Cordwell Buenz
- Buildings: Legacy Tower; 340 on the Park; The Heritage at Millennium Park; One Rincon Hill

John Lahey, AIA, is an American architect who is chairman and a principal in charge of design for Solomon Cordwell Buenz (SCB). He is an authority on high-rise residential, transit-oriented development, and innovative design.

Lahey earned a Bachelor of Architecture from Cornell University.

== Projects ==
- Easter Seals Metropolitan Chicago Therapeutic School and Center for Autism Research - the first American school designed specifically to meet the needs of students with autism.
- 340 on the Park (Chicago) - a 62-story all-residential tower and the first in the Midwest to achieve LEED silver certification.

== Awards ==
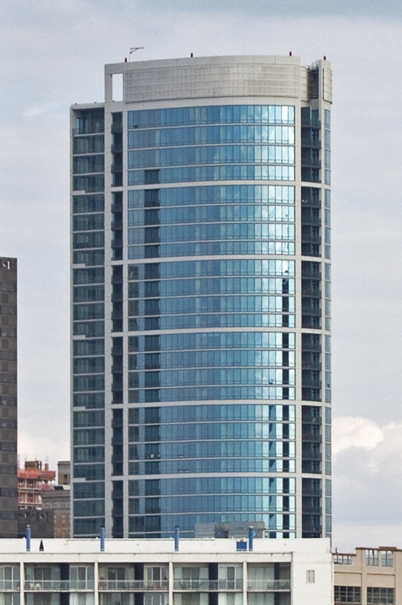
SCB's Murano (skyscraper)

Lahey and SCB are recipients of:

- The LEAF Award for Best Use of Technology
- The CBC Merit Award and IBS Award for Loyola University's Richard J. Klarchek Information Commons
- Chicago Tribune Architecture Firm of the Year 2000

== See also ==
- SCB Architecture
