= Lahey =

Lahey is a surname. It may refer to:

== People ==
- Alex Lahey (born 1992), Australian musician
- Ashley Lahey (born 1999), American tennis player
- Benjamin Lahey, American psychologist
- Edwin A. Lahey (1902–1969), American journalist
- Frank Lahey (1880–1953), American physician
- John C. Lahey (born 1953), American architect
- John L. Lahey (born 1946), president of Quinnipiac University
- Lyle Lahey (1931–2013), American political cartoonist, journalist and author
- May Darlington Lahey (1889–1984), Australian-American lawyer and judge
- Pat Lahey (1919–2009), American football player
- Patrick Lahey, co-founder of Triton Submarines
- Raymond Lahey (1940–2022), Canadian Catholic bishop
- Romeo Lahey (1887–1968), Australian businessman
- Tim Lahey (born 1982), American baseball player
- Vida Lahey (1882–1968), Australian artist

== Fictional characters ==
- Isaac Lahey, in Teen Wolf - see List of Teen Wolf (2011 TV series) secondary characters
- Jim Lahey, Barb Lahey and their daughter Treena Lahey, in the television series Trailer Park Boys
- Nathaniel "Nate" Lahey, a main character in How to Get Away with Murder, an American television series

== See also ==
- Lahey Health, a health service organization in Massachusetts
- Lahey Hospital & Medical Center, a teaching hospital of Tufts University School of Medicine
- Laheys Tramway, a private timber railway in Queensland, Australia
