= BRB =

BRB may refer to:

- Banco de Brasília, a state-owned Brazilian bank
- Bank of the Republic of Burundi or Banque de la République du Burundi, the official name in French of the central bank of Burundi
- Barbados, ISO country code BRB, country in the Caribbean Sea
- Barreirinhas Airport, IATA Code BRB, airport in Barreirinhas, Brazil
- Bayerische Regiobahn - regional railway company in Bavaria, Germany, a subsidiary of Transdev
- "Be right back", in Internet/chat slang, also sometimes treated as a synonym of "bathroom break"
- The Beatles: Rock Band, 2009 music video game
- Benefits Review Board, a part of the United States Department of Labor
- Beta Ray Bill, a fictional character from the Marvel universe
- Beveled rim bowl, clay bowls most common in the 4th millennium B.C.
- Bibliothèque royale de Belgique, the Royal Library of Belgium
- Big red button, a type of command button
- Birmingham Royal Ballet, a ballet company
- Blaire Reinhard Band, a New Jersey rock band
- Blood-retinal barrier, cells in the eye that prevent certain substances from entering the tissue of the retina
- Brandenburg an der Havel, German car number plates BRB, town in Brandenburg, Germany
- BRB Internacional, a Spanish animation studio.
- Brienz Rothorn Bahn, a Swiss railway
- Brigade de répression du banditisme, a special police unit of the French Ministry of the Interior.
- Brazos River Bottom, an LGBT club in Houston
- British Railways Board, the former governing body of British Railways
  - BRB (Residuary) Limited, its successor
- Britton-Robinson buffer
- Buckling restrained brace, a specialized earthquake bracing system
- "BRB", a song by Bazzi from the album Cosmic
- "BRB", a song by Ciara from the EP CiCi
