= John Lahey =

John Lahey may refer to:

- John L. Lahey (born 1946), American academic administrator
- John C. Lahey, American architect
