= Amsysco =

AMSYSCO, Inc. is a post-tensioning supplier based in Romeoville, Illinois. AMSYSCO, Inc. has an unbonded plant that it is certified under the Post-Tensioning Institute's "plant certification" program.

== Business Segments ==
The company is involved in five major business segments: arts & sports stadiums, commercial buildings, commercial multi-family housing, parking structures, and barrier cable.

== History ==
AMSYSCO, Inc. was founded in 1981 by Rattan Khosa. In 1984, it joined the Post-Tensioning Institute, and in 1999, Rattan Khosa was elected President of Post-Tensioning Institute for a two-year term. In 2008, the company was awarded the Post-Tensioning Institute's "Project of the Year - Award of Excellence" for the New Guthrie Theater in Minneapolis, Minnesota.

== Notable Projects ==
- 1998 – Minneapolis-Saint Paul International Airport Parking Structures (Minneapolis, MN)
- 2004 – Epic Campus (Verona, WI)
- 2005 – 340 On The Park Condominiums (Chicago, IL)
- 2006 – Lumiere Casino (St. Louis, MO)
- 2007 – Indianapolis International Airport Parking Structures (Indianapolis, IN)
- 2008 – New Guthrie Theater (Minneapolis, MN)
- 2009 – Minnesota Twins Ballpark Target Field (Minneapolis, MN)
