= Starbucks Reserve Roastery (Chicago) =

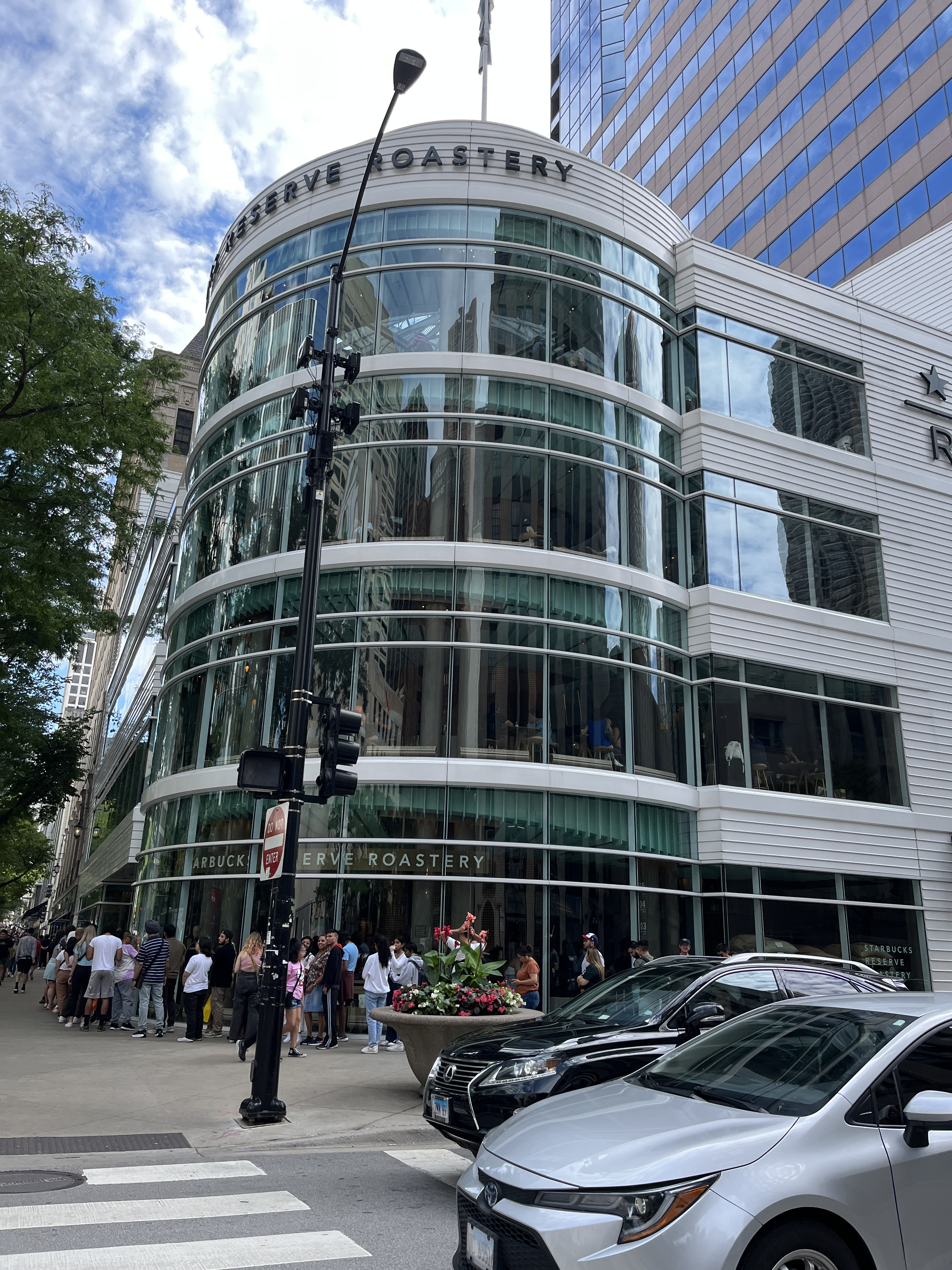
- Starbucks Reserve Roastery, 2023
- Interactive map of Starbucks Reserve Roastery

Restaurant information
- Established: November 15, 2019; 6 years ago
- Location: 646 N. Michigan Ave., Chicago, Illinois, 60611, United States
- Coordinates: 41°53′38.5″N 87°37′28.5″W
- Website: www.starbucksreserve.com/locations/chicago-roastery

The Starbucks Reserve Roastery in Chicago, which opened November 15, 2019, is the largest Starbucks location in the world and latest roastery to be built. The building at 646 North Michigan Avenue on the Magnificent Mile has five stories at 35,000 square feet (3,300 m^{2}). It was formerly a flagship store for Crate & Barrel. The roastery includes a coffee bar, cocktail bar, and Italian-style sandwich shop. Starbucks involved Crate & Barrel founder Gordon Segal and Solomon Cordwell Buenz, original architects of the building in 1990, in remodeling the space.

Inside the building are eight 56-foot-tall (17 m) copper tubes that transport coffee beans from floor to floor. Each floor has a theme and variety of delicacies. The first floor is the main floor for customers to grab coffee and treats to go, roasting equipment, a coffee bean scoop bar, as well as souvenirs and merchandise. The second floor includes a Princi location selling pastries, fresh croissants, cannoli, cheesecakes, and other sweet tarts. Other foods like pastas and pizzas can also be found on the same floor. The third floor consists of barrels filled with Guatemalan cold brew and other rare coffees. The roastery's cocktail bar is on the fourth floor; it serves both classic and modern drinks. The fifth floor is a public roof terrace.
