= Buckling-restrained braced frame =

Structural steel frame that provides lateral resistance to buckling

Buckling-restrained braced frame (BRBF) is a structural steel frame that provides lateral resistance to buckling, particularly during seismic activity.

The BRBF is typically a special case of a concentrically braced frame. Tests have demonstrated BRBF systems are highly effective for energy dissipation, while being vulnerable to large deformations and story drift.

A buckling-restrained brace (BRB) consists of a steel core surrounded by a hollow steel section, coated with a low-friction material, and then grouted with a specialized mortar. The encasing and mortar prohibit the steel core from buckling when in compression. At the same time, the coating prevents axial load from being transferred to the encasement, thus preventing strength loss and allowing for better and more symmetric cyclic performance. These elements most commonly brace a bay diagonally or in a chevron pattern. Because maximum tension and compression forces in a BRB are much closer than in a standard brace, there is much less imbalance of force in the chevron configuration resulting in smaller beam sizes than a standard braced frame.
