= Braced frame =

Structural system designed to resist wind and seismic forces

In structural engineering, a braced frame is a structural system designed to resist wind and earthquake forces. Members in a braced frame are not allowed to sway laterally (which can be done using shear wall or a diagonal steel sections, similar to a truss).

== Types of braced frame ==
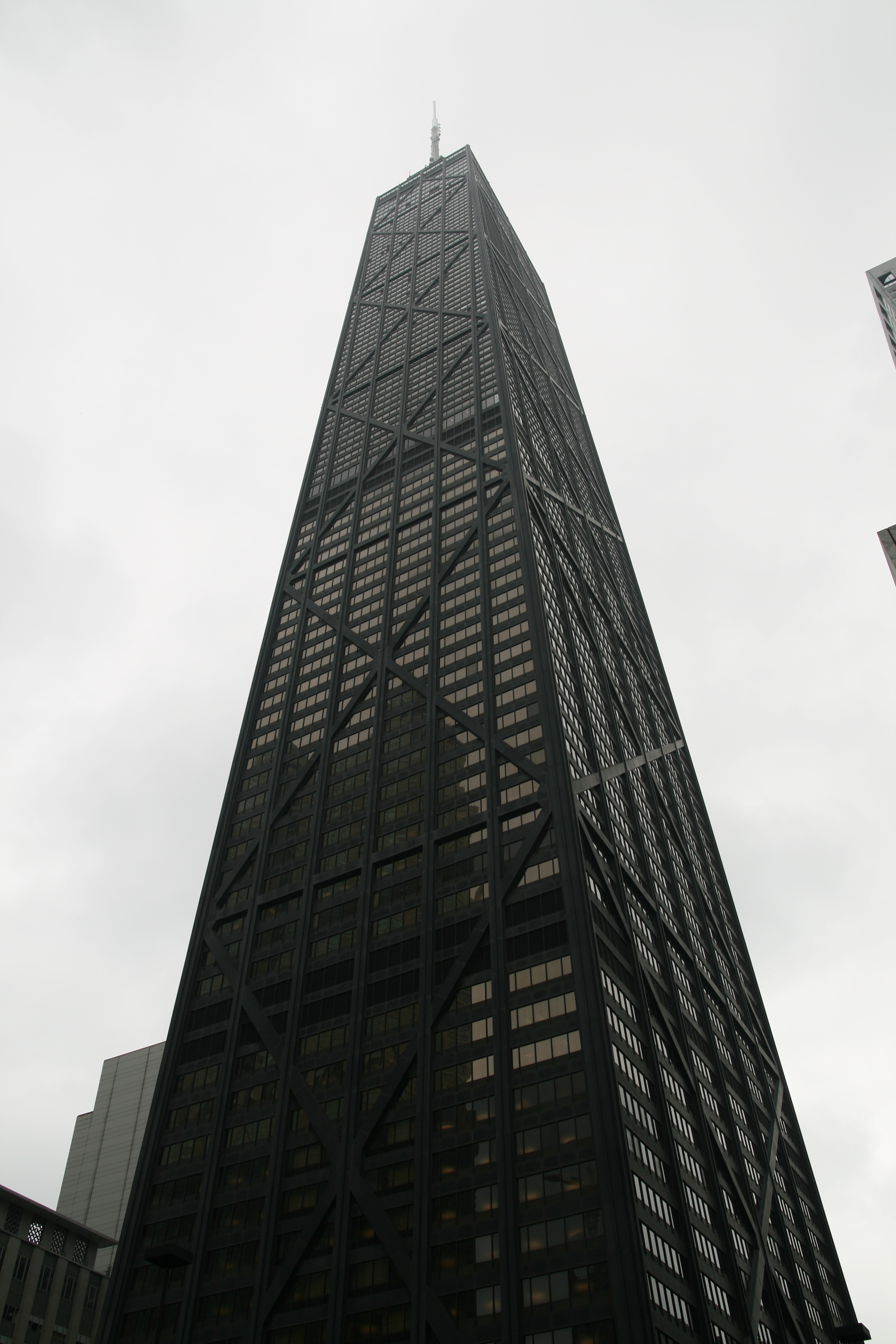
The John Hancock Center is a braced tube structure.

Most braced frames are concentric. This means that, where members intersect at a node, the centroid of each member passes through the same point.

Concentrically braced frames can further be classified as either ordinary or special. Ordinary concentric braced frames (OCBFs) do not have extensive requirements regarding members or connections, and are frequently used in areas of low seismic risk. OCBF steel frame buildings originated in Chicago and reinforced concrete frames originated in Germany and France – areas where earthquakes were not an engineering consideration. Accordingly, special concentrically or eccentrically braced frames were later developed with extensive design requirements, and are frequently used in areas of high seismic risk. The purpose of the concentrically- or eccentrically-braced design is to ensure adequate ductility (i.e., to stretch without breaking suddenly).

== See also ==
- Structural engineering
- Earthquake engineering
- Buckling-restrained braced frame
