= Brazos River Bottom =

Gay bar in Houston, Texas, United States

Coordinates: 29.749140°N 95.377831°W

Brazos River Bottom, also known as the BRB, was a gay bar located in the Midtown, Houston, Texas, United States, that opened in 1978. At the time of its closure in 2013, it was one of Houston's oldest gay bars, and the oldest still running at its original location.

== Description ==
Brazos River Bottom hosted a unique cowboy atmosphere, drawing on Houston's Old Western history. BRB offered free line dancing lessons on Thursdays and included a large dance hall, a disco ball, and pool tables. BRB also hosted the Houston Council of Clubs's Let Us Entertain You Weekend, which began in 1971 and consists of four days of social events hosted by the council. The BRB also hosted charity fundraisers on Sunday nights, and in 2013, was a venue for several of the Texas Gay Rodeo Association's entertainment events.

== History ==
The BRB opened at 2400 Brazos Street, Houston, in February 1978 in a building that had been constructed in 1887, and continued to operate there until its closing. Before the BRB opened, at least three other bars had resided at that location, with at least one of them — The Golden Spur, which closed in May 1975 — also having been a gay bar. Earlier bars at that location include the Q-1 Western and Levi's. The BRB also became the meeting place of the Colt 45's, who became activists in response to the HIV/AIDS crisis. After the closure in 2009 of Mary's, another gay bar in the city, BRB was the longest-running Houston gay bar at its original location. That same year, BRB was named Houston's Best Dance Club by the Houston Press in their "Best of Houston 2009" edition.

The BRB closed on March 30, 2013, just after its 35th anniversary, with its owners citing deteriorating building conditions as the reason for its closure. The owners also stated that they hoped to open BRB again at a different location, but as of June 2016, the BRB has not been reopened. However, several of the BRB's former patrons opened the Neon Boots Dancehall & Saloon elsewhere in Houston.

== Reception ==
Brazos River Bottom was hailed as a fixture of LGBT culture in Houston during the time it remained open, and after its closure, LGBT Houstonians were hard-pressed to find another hangout location.
