= Steel frame =

Building technique using skeleton frames of vertical steel columns

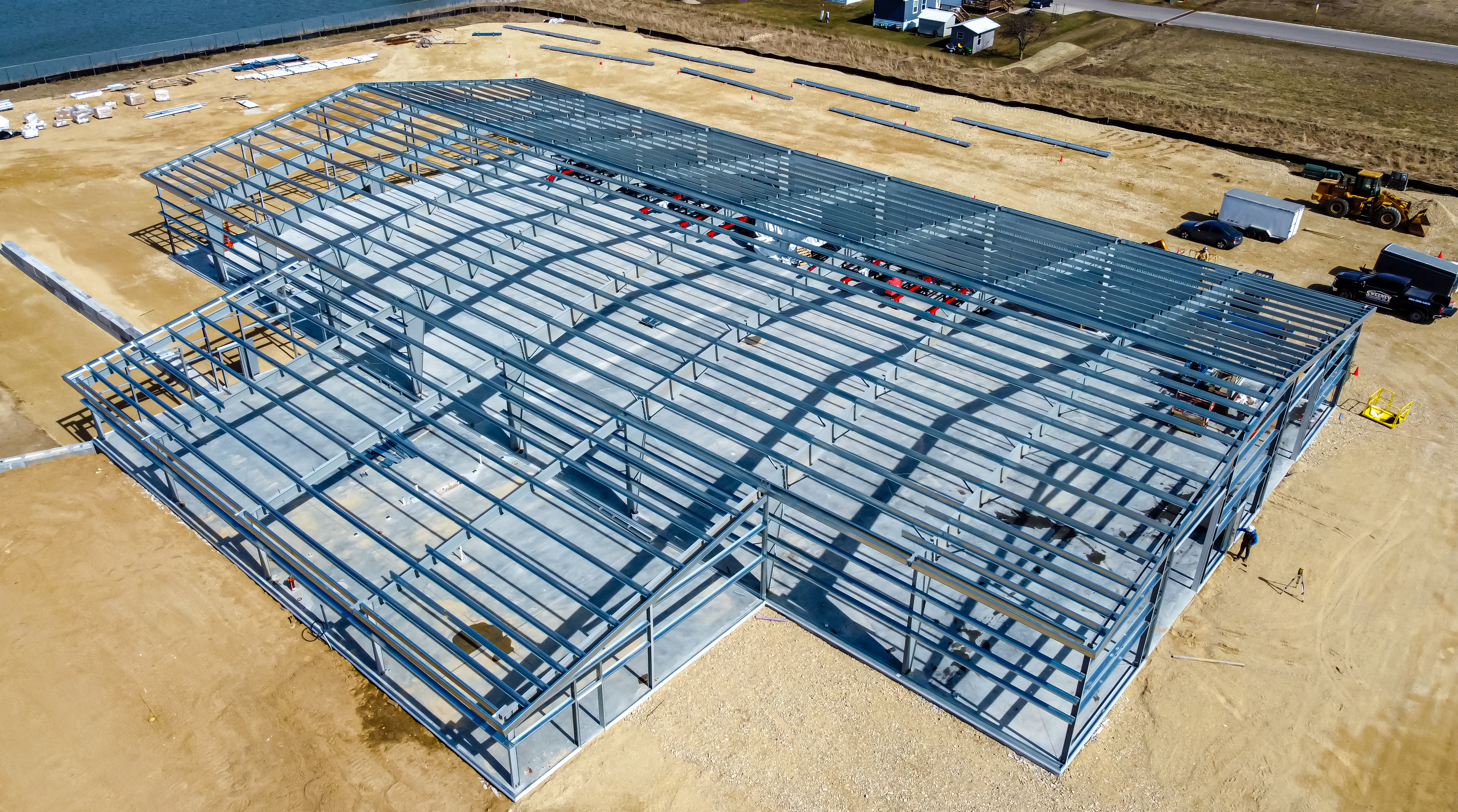
Steel frame structure

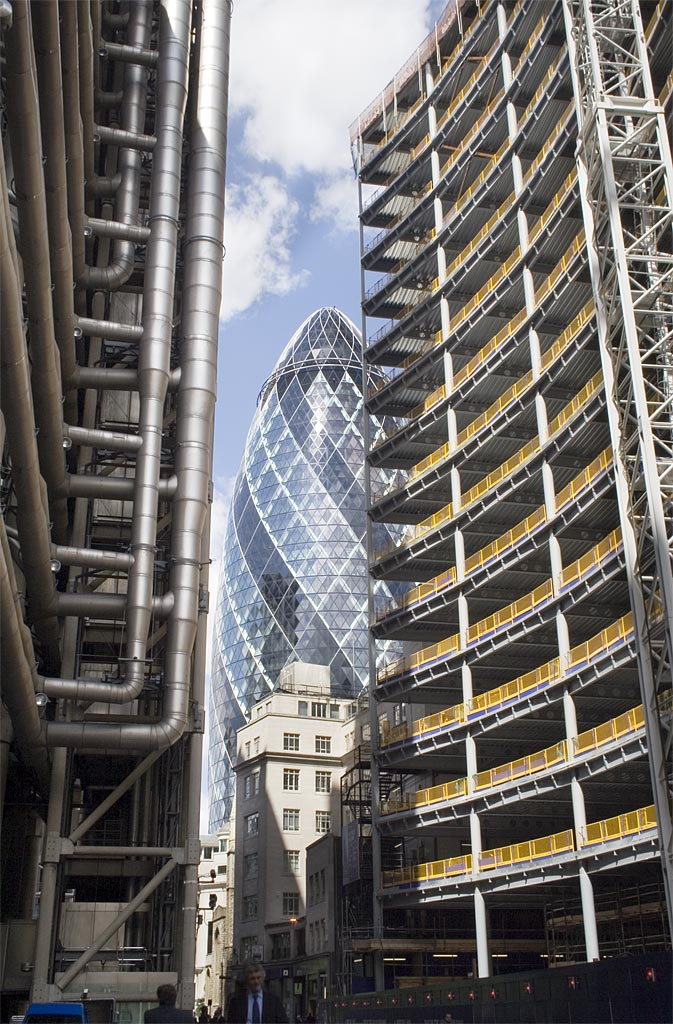
Rectangular steel frame, or "perimeter frame" of the Willis building (at right) contrasted against the diagrid frame at 30 St Mary Axe (at center), in London.

Steel frame is a building technique with a "skeleton frame" of vertical steel columns and horizontal I-beams, constructed in a rectangular grid to support the floors, roof and walls of a building which are all attached to the frame. The development of this technique made the construction of the skyscraper possible. Steel frame has displaced its predecessor, the iron frame, in the early 20th century.

== Concept ==
The rolled steel "profile" or cross section of steel columns takes the shape of the letter "Ɪ". The two wide flanges of a column are thicker and wider than the flanges on a beam to better withstand compressive stress in the structure. Square and round tubular sections of steel can also be used, often filled with concrete. Steel beams are connected to the columns with bolts and threaded fasteners, and historically connected by rivets. The central "web" of the steel I-beam is often wider than a column web to resist the higher bending moments that occur in beams.

Wide sheets of steel deck can be used to cover the top of the steel frame as a "form" or corrugated mold, below a thick layer of concrete and steel reinforcing bars. Another popular alternative is a floor of precast concrete flooring units with some form of concrete topping. Often in office buildings, the final floor surface is provided by some form of raised flooring system with the void between the walking surface and the structural floor being used for cables and air handling ducts.

The frame needs to be protected from fire because steel softens at high temperature and this can cause a building to partially collapse. In the case of the columns this is usually done by encasing it in some form of fire resistant structure such as masonry, concrete or plasterboard. The beams may be cased in concrete, plasterboard or sprayed with a coating to insulate it from the heat of the fire or it can be protected by a fire-resistant ceiling construction. Asbestos was a popular material for fireproofing steel structures up until the early 1970s, before the health risks of asbestos fibres were fully understood.

The exterior "skin" of the building is anchored to the frame using a variety of construction techniques and following a huge variety of architectural styles. Bricks, stone, reinforced concrete, architectural glass, sheet metal and simply paint have been used to cover the frame to protect the steel from the weather.

== Cold-formed steel frames ==
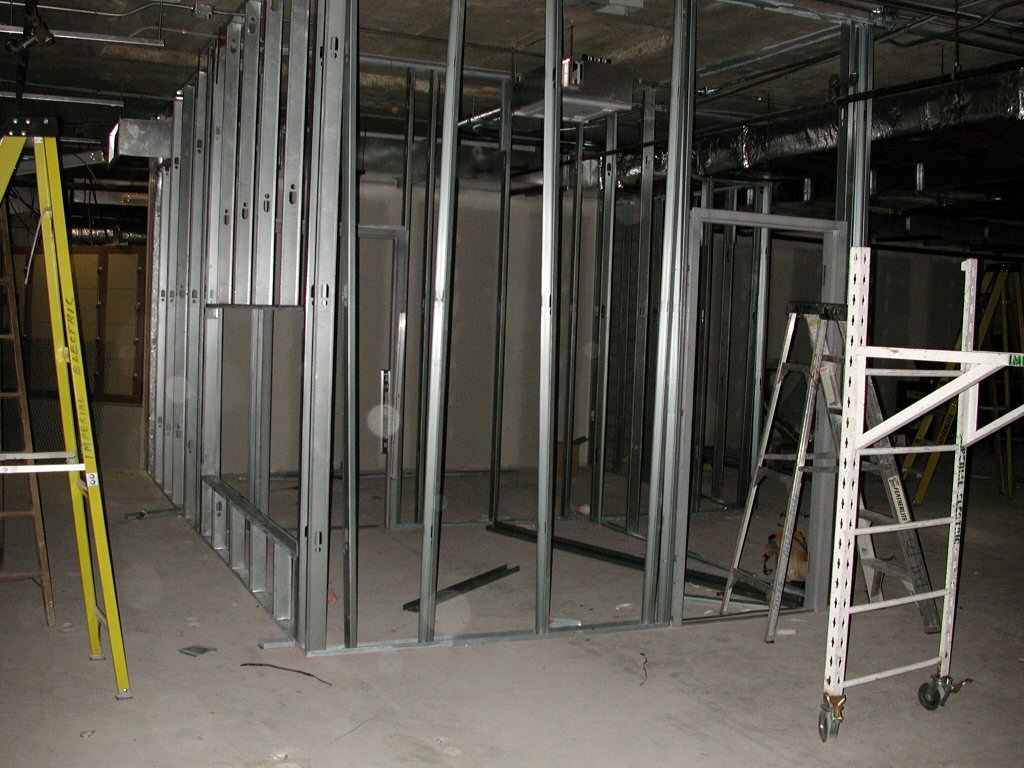
Interior partition walls made with cold-formed steel

Cold-formed steel frames are also known as lightweight steel framing (LSF).

Thin sheets of galvanized steel can be cold formed into steel studs for use as a structural or non-structural building material for both external and partition walls in both residential, commercial and industrial construction projects (pictured). The dimension of the room is established with a horizontal track that is anchored to the floor and ceiling to outline each room. The vertical studs are arranged in the tracks, usually spaced 16 inches (410 mm) apart, and fastened at the top and bottom.

The typical profiles used in residential construction are the C-shape stud and the U-shaped track, and a variety of other profiles. Framing members are generally produced in a thickness of 12 to 25 gauge. Heavy gauges, such as 12 and 14 gauge, are commonly used when axial loads (parallel to the length of the member) are high, such as in load-bearing construction. Medium-heavy gauges, such as 16 and 18 gauge, are commonly used when there are no axial loads but heavy lateral loads (perpendicular to the member) such as exterior wall studs that need to resist hurricane-force wind loads along coasts. Light gauges, such as 25 gauge, are commonly used where there are no axial loads and very light lateral loads such as in interior construction where the members serve as framing for demising walls between rooms. The wall finish is anchored to the two flange sides of the stud, which varies from 1 1/4 to 3 inches (32 to 76 mm) thick, and the width of web ranges from 1 5/8 to 14 inches (41 to 356 mm). Rectangular sections are removed from the web to provide access for electrical wiring.

Steel mills produce galvanized sheet steel, the base material for the manufacture of cold-formed steel profiles. Sheet steel is then roll-formed into the final profiles used for framing. The sheets are zinc coated (galvanized) to increase protection against oxidation and corrosion. Steel framing provides excellent design flexibility due to the high strength-to-weight ratio of steel, which allows it to span over long distances, and also resist wind and earthquake loads.

Steel-framed walls can be designed to offer excellent thermal and acoustic properties – one of the specific considerations when building using cold-formed steel is that thermal bridging can occur across the wall system between the outside environment and interior conditioned space. Thermal bridging can be protected against by installing a layer of externally fixed insulation along the steel framing – typically referred to as a 'thermal break'.

The spacing between studs is typically 16 inches on center for home exterior and interior walls depending on designed loading requirements. In office suites the spacing is 24 inches (610 mm) on center for all walls except for elevator and staircase wells.

== Hot-formed steel frames ==
Hot-formed frames, also known as hot-rolled steel frames, are engineered from steel that undergoes a complex manufacturing process known as hot rolling. During this procedure, steel members are heated to temperatures above the steel’s recrystallization temperature (1,700 °F or 930 °C).This process refines the grain structure of the steel and aligns its crystalline lattice. It is then passed through precision rollers to achieve the desired frame profiles.

The distinctive feature of hot-formed frames is their substantial beam thickness and larger dimensions, making them more robust compared to their cold-rolled counterparts. This inherent strength makes them particularly well-suited for application in larger structures, as they show minimal deformation when subjected to substantial loads.

While it is true that hot-rolled steel members often have a higher initial cost per component when compared to cold-rolled steel, their cost-efficiency becomes increasingly evident when used in the construction of larger structures. This is because hot-rolled steel frames require fewer components to span equivalent distances, leading to economic advantages in bigger projects.

== History ==
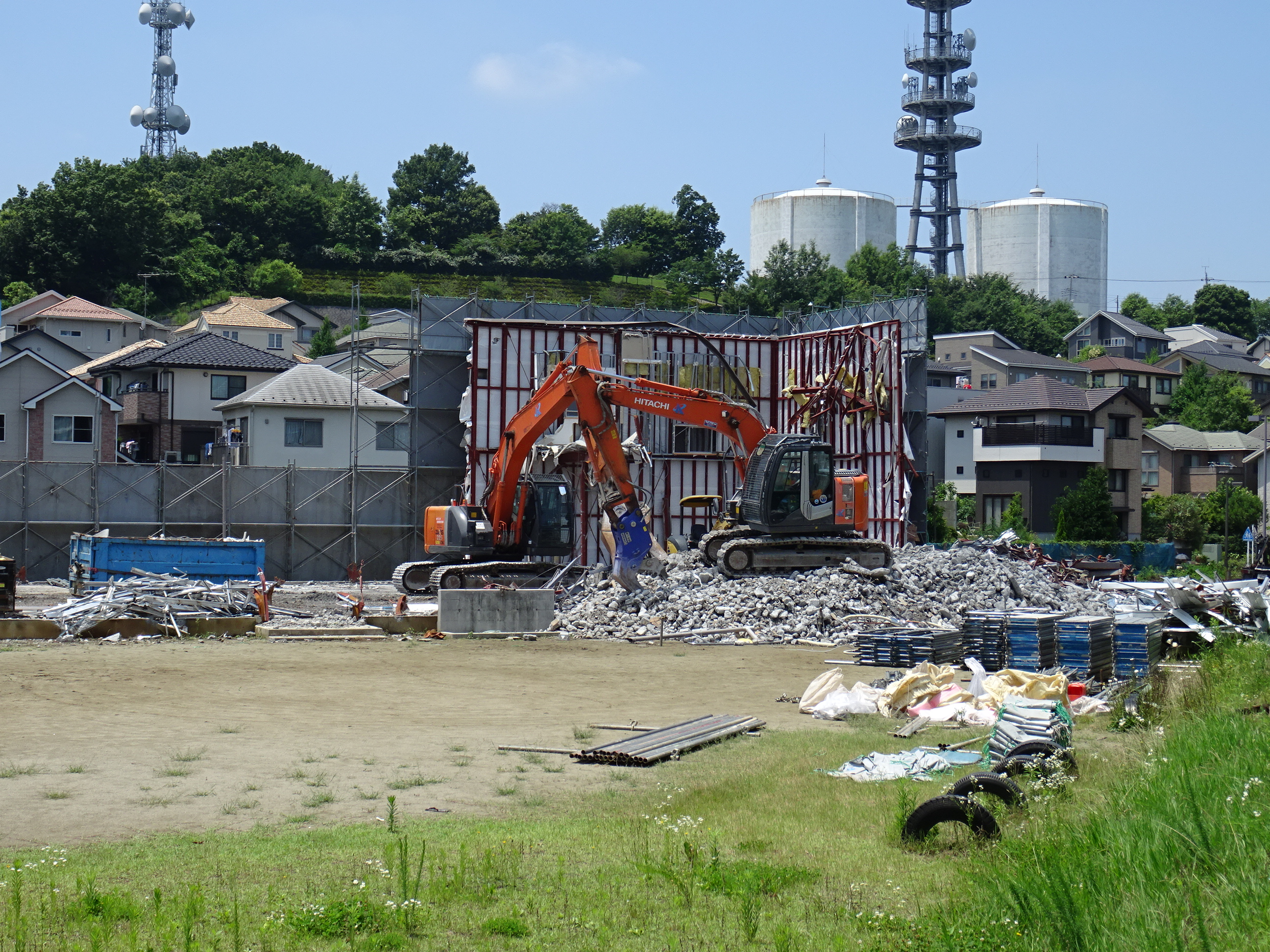
A school building being demolished in Tama New Town, Tokyo due to low enrollment, showing the steel frame used during its construction inside the remaining piece of outer wall.

The use of steel instead of iron for structural purposes was initially slow. The first iron-framed building, Ditherington Flax Mill, had been built in 1797, but it was not until the development of the Bessemer process in 1855 that steel production was made efficient enough for steel to be a widely used material. Cheap steels, which had high tensile and compressive strengths and good ductility, were available from about 1870, but wrought and cast iron continued to satisfy most of the demand for iron-based building products, due mainly to problems of producing steel from alkaline ores. These problems, caused principally by the presence of phosphorus, were solved by Sidney Gilchrist Thomas in 1879.

It was not until 1880 that an era of construction based on reliable mild steel began. By that date the quality of steels being produced had become reasonably consistent.

The Home Insurance Building, completed in 1885, was the first to use skeleton frame construction, completely removing the load bearing function of its masonry cladding. In this case the iron columns are merely embedded in the walls, and their load carrying capacity appears to be secondary to the capacity of the masonry, particularly for wind loads. In the United States, the first steel framed building was the Rand McNally Building in Chicago, erected in 1890.

The Royal Insurance Building in Liverpool designed by James Francis Doyle in 1895 (erected 1896–1903) was the first to use a steel frame in the United Kingdom.

== See also ==
- Buckling-restrained braced frame (BRBF)
- Curtain wall (architecture)
- Prefabricated buildings
- Steel building
- Structural steel
- Structural robustness
- Tension fabric structure

== Sources ==
- Bussell, Michael (2008-04-15). "Use of Iron and Steel in Buildings". Structures & Construction in Historic Building Conservation (PDF). Oxford, UK: Blackwell Publishing Ltd. doi:10.1002/9780470691816.ch10. ISBN 978-0-470-69181-6.
