= The Heritage at Millennium Park =

Building in Chicago, Illinois

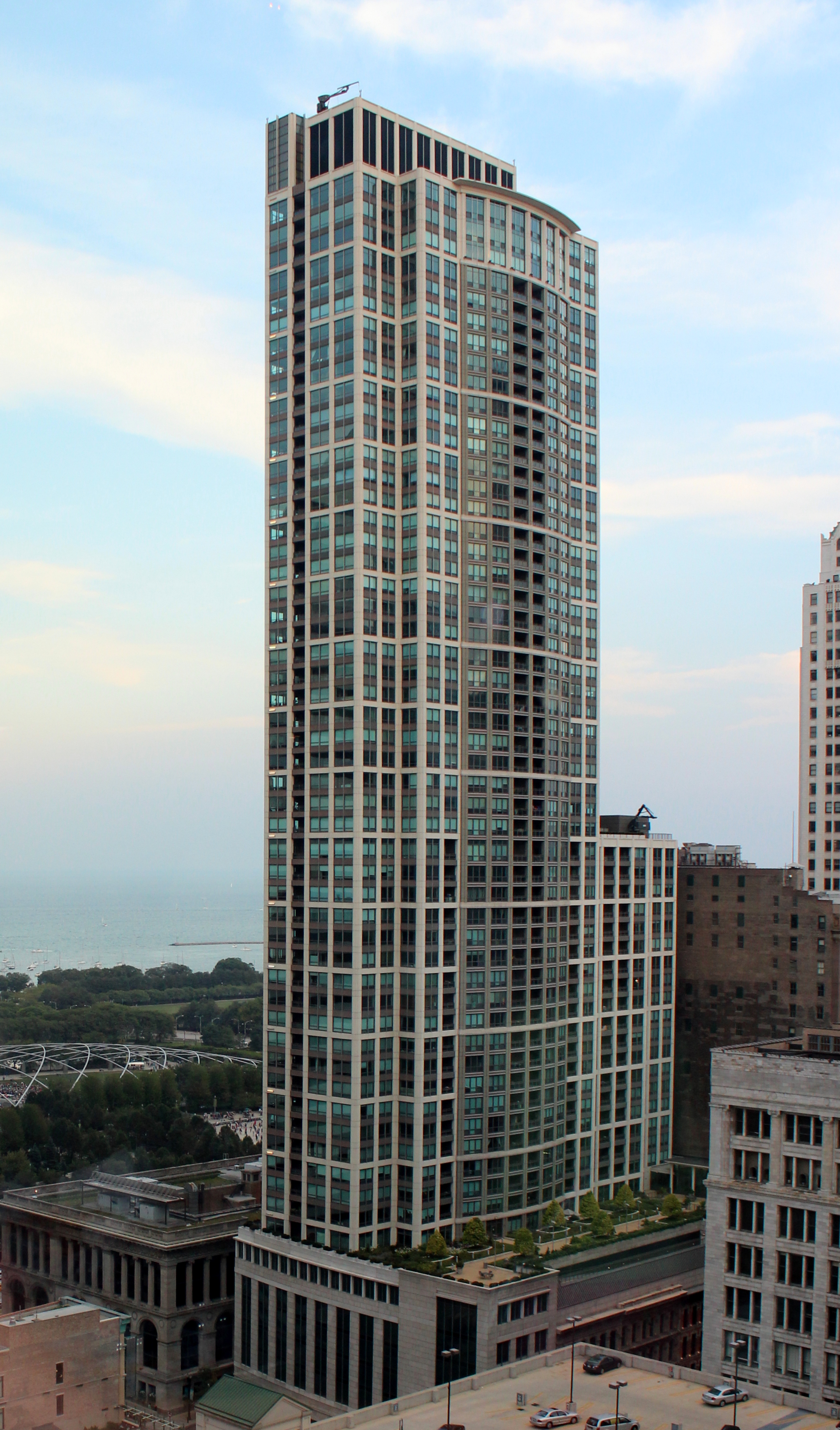
- The Heritage from the West
- Interactive map of the The Heritage at Millennium Park area

General information
- Type: Mixed use
- Location: Chicago, Illinois, 130 N. Garland Ct.
- Coordinates: 41°53′02″N 87°37′32″W
- Construction started: 2003
- Completed: 2005

Height
- Roof: 631 ft (192 m)

Technical details
- Floor count: 57
- Floor area: 1,118,779 ft^{2} (103,938.0 m^{2})

Design and construction
- Architect: Solomon Cordwell Buenz
- Developer: Mesa Development, LLC
- Main contractor: Walsh Construction Company

The Heritage at Millennium Park, located at 130 N. Garland Court in Chicago, Illinois is a mixed-use tower. Completed in 2005, with a height of 631 feet (192 m) and 57 floors, the building was designed by the architectural firm Solomon Cordwell Buenz (architects of Legacy Tower as well, which is also located in the city). It is the 47th-tallest building in Chicago. Like the Legacy Tower, the Heritage preserved the façades of four existing buildings on its base.

The Heritage is located to the west of Millennium Park, with unobstructed views of Millennium Park, parts of Grant Park, and Lake Michigan. It is surrounded by the Marshall Field and Company Building to the west on Wabash Avenue, We Will sculpture to the northeast on the corner of Randolph Street and Garland Court, Chicago Cultural Center to the east on North Garland Court, and Garland Building to the south. It has a private indoor pool, health club, dog run, party room, rooftop deck, and indoor parking. The tower is included in the extensive downtown underground pedway system. In addition to condominiums, the Heritage also contains ground floor retail space.

== Trivia ==
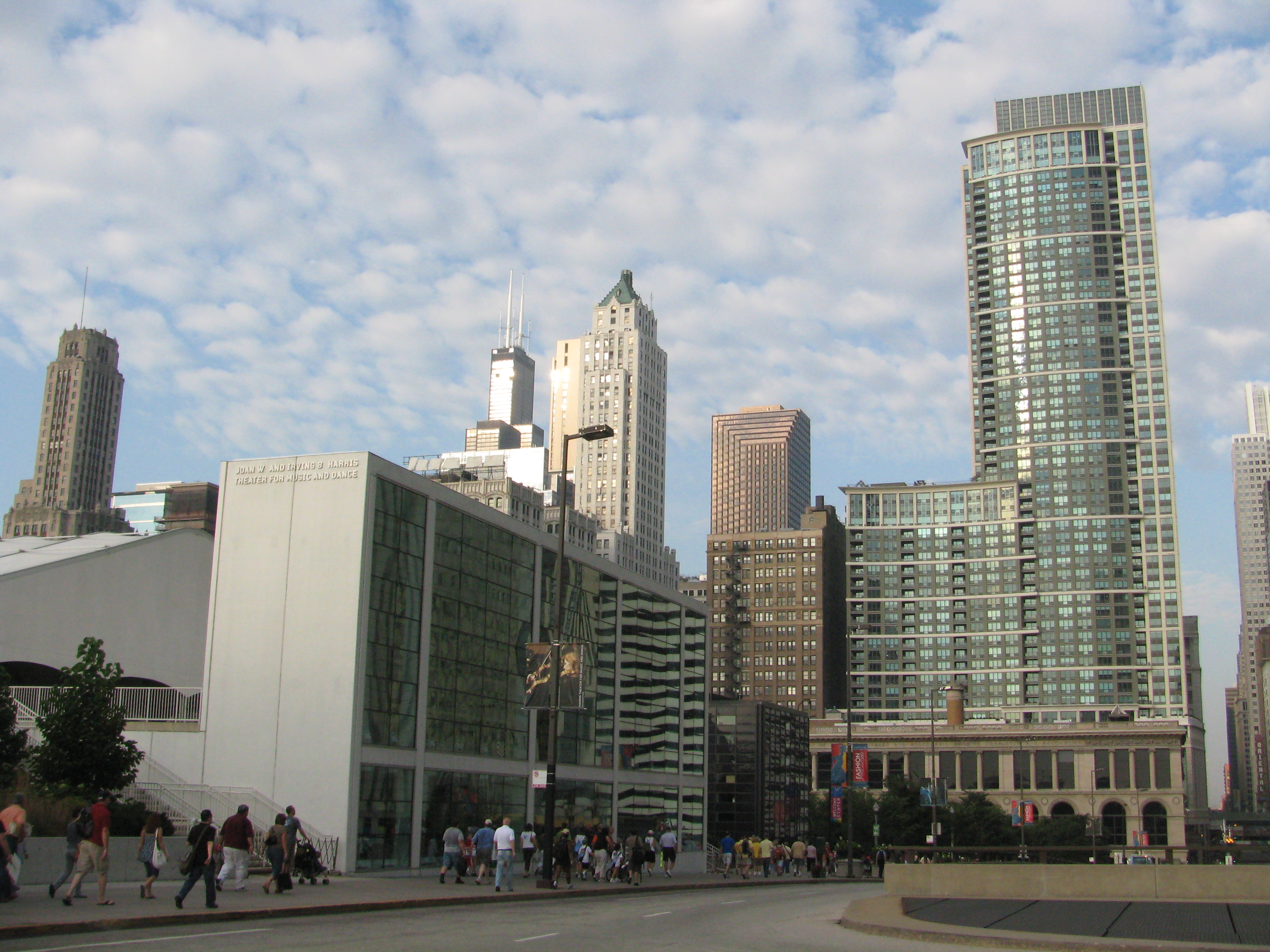
Harris Theater (left) and The Heritage at Millennium Park (right) from Randolph Street

It was said that Mayor Richard M. Daley was considering moving to the tower, but later decided to stay put in his South Loop residence as noted in an article in the Chicago Tribune in November 2005.

In 2006, ZIP Code 60602, was named by Forbes among the top 500 most expensive ZIP codes in the country, as the Heritage at Millennium Park leading the way for other upscale buildings, such as the Waterview Tower, The Legacy at Millennium Park, and MoMo, to be built in the area. The median sale price for residential real estate was $701,000 in 2005 according to Forbes. In 2006, The New York Times reported that condominium sale prices at the Heritage were ranging from $245 thousand to $3.5 million per unit.

The building bears a slight resemblance to One Rincon Hill in San Francisco which was designed by the same architectural firm.

== Position in skyline ==
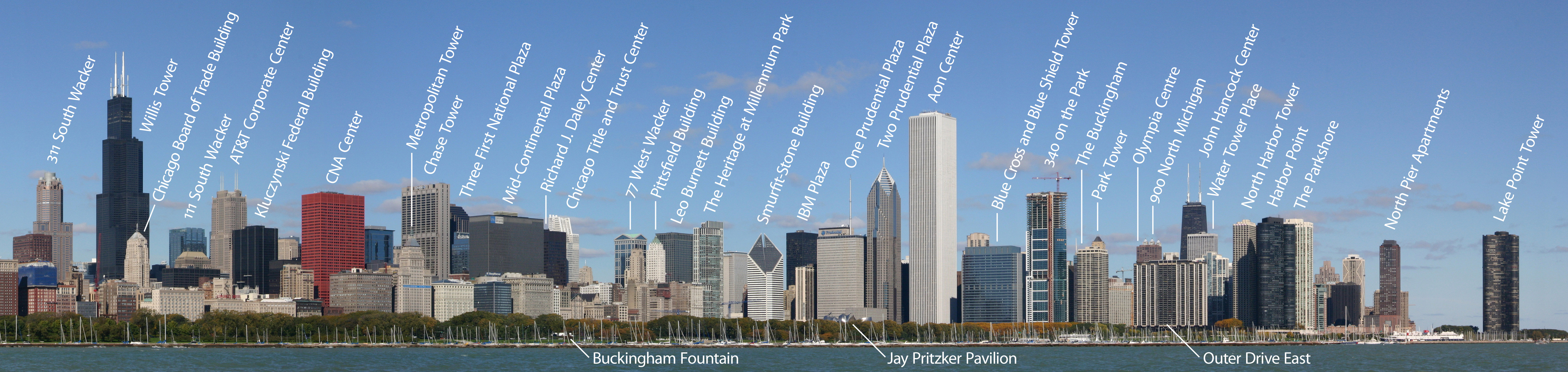

== See also ==
- List of buildings
- List of skyscrapers
- List of tallest buildings in Chicago
- List of tallest buildings in the United States
- World's tallest structures
