= Buckling-restrained brace =

A buckling-restrained brace (BRB) is a structural brace in a building, designed to allow the building to withstand cyclical lateral loadings, typically earthquake-induced loading. It consists of a slender steel core, a concrete casing designed to continuously support the core and prevent buckling under axial compression, and an interface region that prevents undesired interactions between the two. Braced frames that use BRBs – known as buckling-restrained braced frames, or BRBFs – have significant advantages over typical braced frames.

== History ==
The concept of BRBs was developed in Japan by Nippon Steel at the end of the 1980s and was known by its trademark name of Unbonded Brace. It was first installed in the United States in 1999, in the Plant & Environmental Sciences Building in U.C. Davis. In 2002, both CoreBrace LLC and Star Seismic LLC were incorporated, and began competition with Nippon in the BRB design market. BRB usage is currently accepted, with its design regulated in current standards, throughout the world.

== Components ==
Three major components of a BRB that can be distinguished are its steel core, its bond-preventing layer, and its casing.

The steel core is designed to resist the full axial tension force developed in the bracing. Its cross-sectional area can be significantly lower than that of regular braces, since its performance is not limited by buckling. The core consists of a middle length that is designed to yield inelastically in the event of a design-level earthquake and rigid, non-yielding lengths on both ends. The increased cross-sectional area of the non-yielding section ensures that it remains elastic, and thus plasticity is concentrated in the middle part of the steel core. Such configuration provides high confidence in the prediction of the element behavior and failure.

The bond-preventing layer decouples the casing from the core. This allows the steel core to resist the full axial force developed in the bracing, as designed.

The casing – through its flexural rigidity – provides lateral support against the flexural buckling of the core. It is typically made of concrete-filled steel tubes. The design criterion for the casing is to provide adequate lateral restraint (i.e. rigidity) against the steel core buckling.

== Characteristics of buckling-restrained braces ==
Because BRBs achieve a high level of ductility and stable, repeatable hysteresis loops, BRBs can absorb significant amount of energy during cyclic loadings, such as an earthquake event.

Preventing buckling leads to similar strength and ductile behavior in compression and tension, illustrating the envelope of the hysteresis curves, also referred as a backbone curve. This curve is considered as an important basis of practical design. The beneficial cyclic behavior of the steel material can therefore be extrapolated to an element level and thus to the overall structural level; an extremely dissipative structure can be designed using BRBs.

Experimental results prove the ductile, stable and repeatable hysteretic behavior of structures built with BRBs. Depending on the configuration of braces, the building codes in the United States allow the use of a response modification factor up to 8, that is comparable to special moment resisting frames (SMRFs); a higher response modification is associated with greater ductility, and thus enhanced post-yielding performance. Thus, the seismic load applied to the structure is efficiently reduced, which results in smaller cross sections for the beams and columns of the braced frames, smaller demands on the connections and, most importantly, the loads on the foundation are drastically decreased.

== Connections ==
The purpose of buckling-restrained braces is to dissipate lateral forces from columns and beams. Therefore, the connection of the braces to beams and columns can greatly affect the performance of the brace in the case of a seismic event. Typically, the brace is attached to a gusset plate, which in turn is welded to the beam and/or column that the brace will be attached to. Usually three types of connections are used for BRBs:

- welded connection – the brace is fully welded to the gusset plate in the field. Although this option requires additional man-hours on-site, it can increase the performance of the brace itself by improving the force transfer mechanism, and potentially lead to smaller braces.
- bolted connection – the brace is bolted to the gusset plate in the field.
- pinned connection – the brace and gusset plate are both designed to accept a pin, which connects them to each other and allows for free rotation. This can be beneficial to the design engineer if he or she needs to specify a pinned-type connection.

In addition to the connection type, the details of the connection can also affect the transfer of forces into the brace, and thus its ultimate performance. Typically, the brace design firm will specify the proper connection details along with the brace dimensions.

== Advantages ==
Comparative studies, as well as completed construction projects, confirm the advantages of buckling-restrained braced frame (BRBF) systems. BRBF systems can be superior to other common dissipative structures with global respect to cost efficiency for the following reasons:

Buckling-restrained braces have energy dissipative behavior that is much improved from that of Special Concentrically Braced Frames (SCBFs). Also, because their behavior factor is higher than that of most other seismic systems (R=8), and the buildings are typically designed with an increased fundamental period, the seismic loads are typically lower. This in turn can lead to a reduction in member (column and beam) sizes, smaller and simpler connections, and smaller foundation demands. Also, BRBs are usually faster to erect than SCBFs, resulting in cost savings to the contractor. Additionally, BRBs can be used in seismic retrofitting. Finally, in the event of an earthquake, since the damage is concentrated over a relatively small area (the brace's yielding core), post-earthquake investigation and replacement is relatively easy.

An independent study concluded that the use of BRBF systems, in lieu of other earthquake systems, produced a savings of up to $5 per square foot.

== Disadvantages ==
Buckling restrained braces rely on the ductility of the steel core to dissipate seismic energy. As the steel core yields, the material work-hardens and becomes stiffer. This work hardening can represent increases in the expected force of up to 2x the initial yield force. This increased stiffness decreases the building's period (negating some of the initial increases) and increases the expected spectral acceleration response requiring stronger foundations and connection strengths.

Buckling restrained braces rely on ductility and generally must be replaced after usage during a major earthquake.

== Reference structures ==
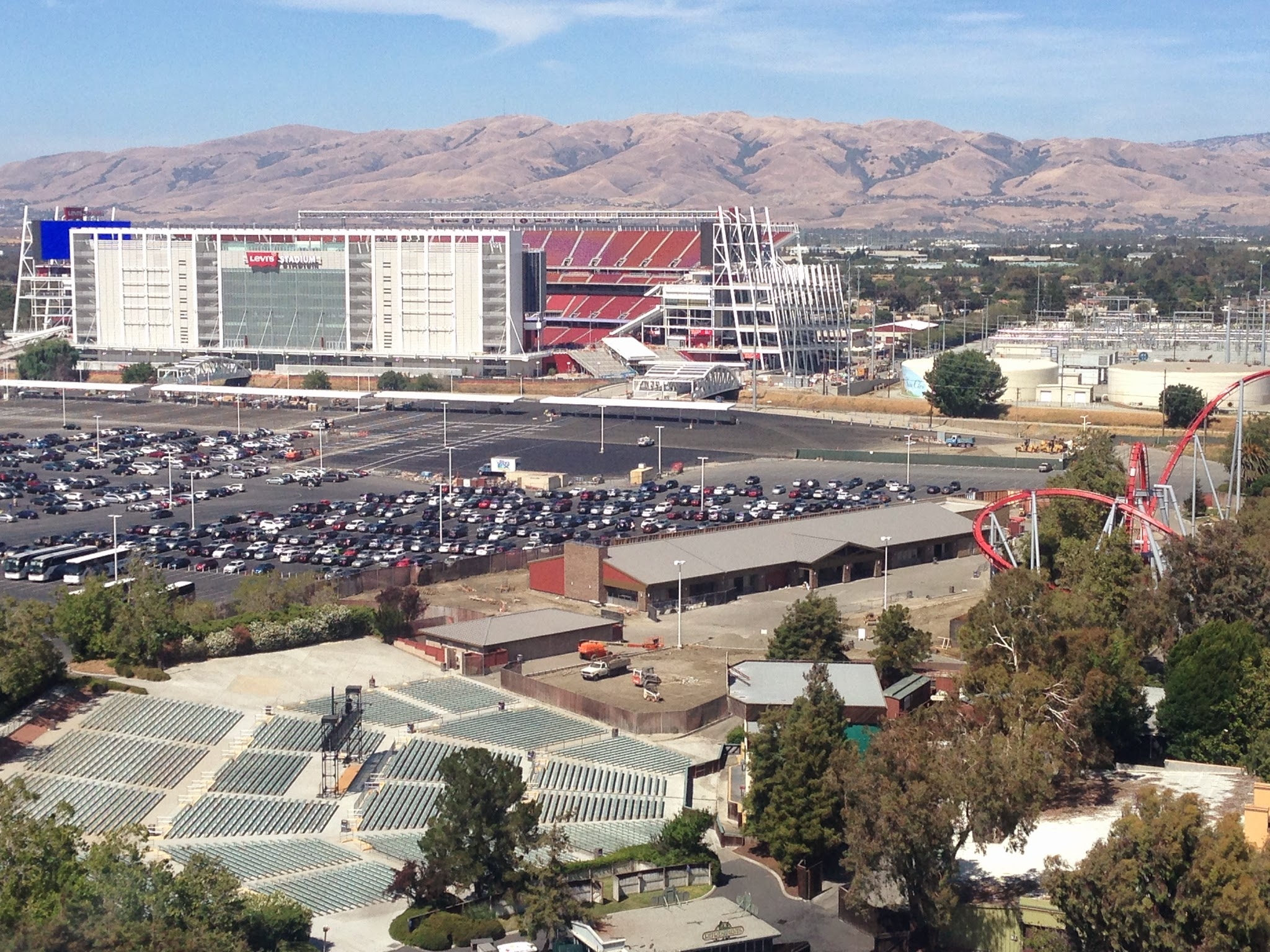
Levi's Stadium, home of the San Francisco 49ers, uses BRBFs for its seismic force resisting system.

- Intermountain Medical Center
- Levi's Stadium - home of the San Francisco 49ers
- L.A. Live - hotel and residences
- One Rincon Hill tower
- Washington Mutual tower, office building
- Rio Tinto Stadium - home of the Major League Soccer team Real Salt Lake.

== See also ==
- S. Hussain, P. V. Benschoten, M. A. Satari, S. Lin: Buckling Restrained Braced Frame Structures: Analysis, Design and Approvals Issues
- L. Calado, J. M. Proenca, A. Panao, E. Nsieri, A. Rutenberg, R. Levy: Prohitech WP5, Innovative materials and techniques, buckling restrained braces
- Bonessio, N., Lomiento, G., Benzoni, G., (2011). An experimental model of buckling restrained braces for multi-performance optimum design. Seismic Isolation and Protection Systems, Vol. 2, No. 1, pp. 75–90. doi:10.2140/siaps.2011.2.75
