= 340 on the Park =

Skyscraper in Chicago, Illinois

Coordinates: 41°53′5.43″N 87°37′8″W

West Chicago Park 30
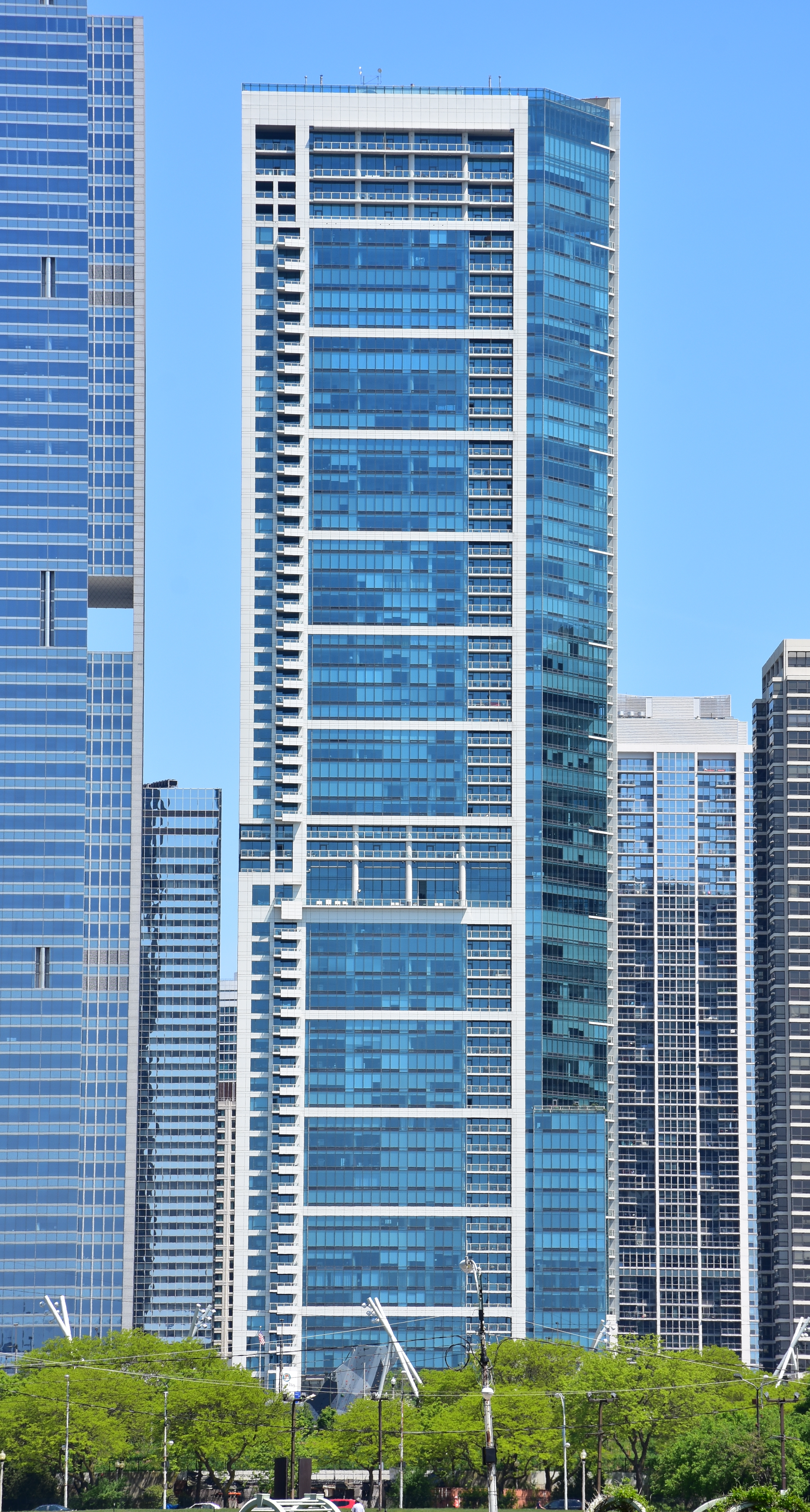
- View from Millennium Park; April, 2018
- Interactive map of the West Chicago Park 30 area

General information
- Type: Residential
- Location: 340 East Randolph St; Chicago, Illinois
- Construction started: 2005
- Completed: 2007

Height
- Roof: 205 m (673 ft)
- Top floor: 192.4 m (631 ft)

Technical details
- Floor count: 62

Design and construction
- Architect: Solomon Cordwell Buenz & Associates
- Developer: Magellan Development Group & LR Development Company
- Structural engineer: Magnusson Klemencic Associates

340 on the Park is a residential tower in the Lakeshore East development of the neighborhood of New Eastside/ East Loop Chicago completed in 2007. The building was the tallest all-residential building in Chicago until the completion of One Museum Park.

The architectural firm Solomon Cordwell Buenz designed the tower and it was built by Magellan Development. The structural engineering firm Magnusson Klemencic Associates designed the building using prestressed concrete in order increase the floor-to-ceiling heights. James McHugh Construction Co installed post-tensioning tendons supplied by Amsysco Inc.

340 on the Park is set flush next to Randolph Street, allowing unobstructed views of Millennium Park, Grant Park, The Park at Lakeshore East and Lake Michigan. The tower's design also allows for nearby buildings to maintain some views of the park.

340 on the Park was the first residential tower in the Midwestern United States to achieve Silver LEED certification for its "green" design, including a large winter garden for residents. Additional benefits include a connection to the Chicago Pedway system, low-flow water fixtures for both residential and public spaces, and energy-efficient fixtures such as lights and mechanical equipment.

The north side of the building is contoured so that views from The Buckingham next to the building are not interfered with.

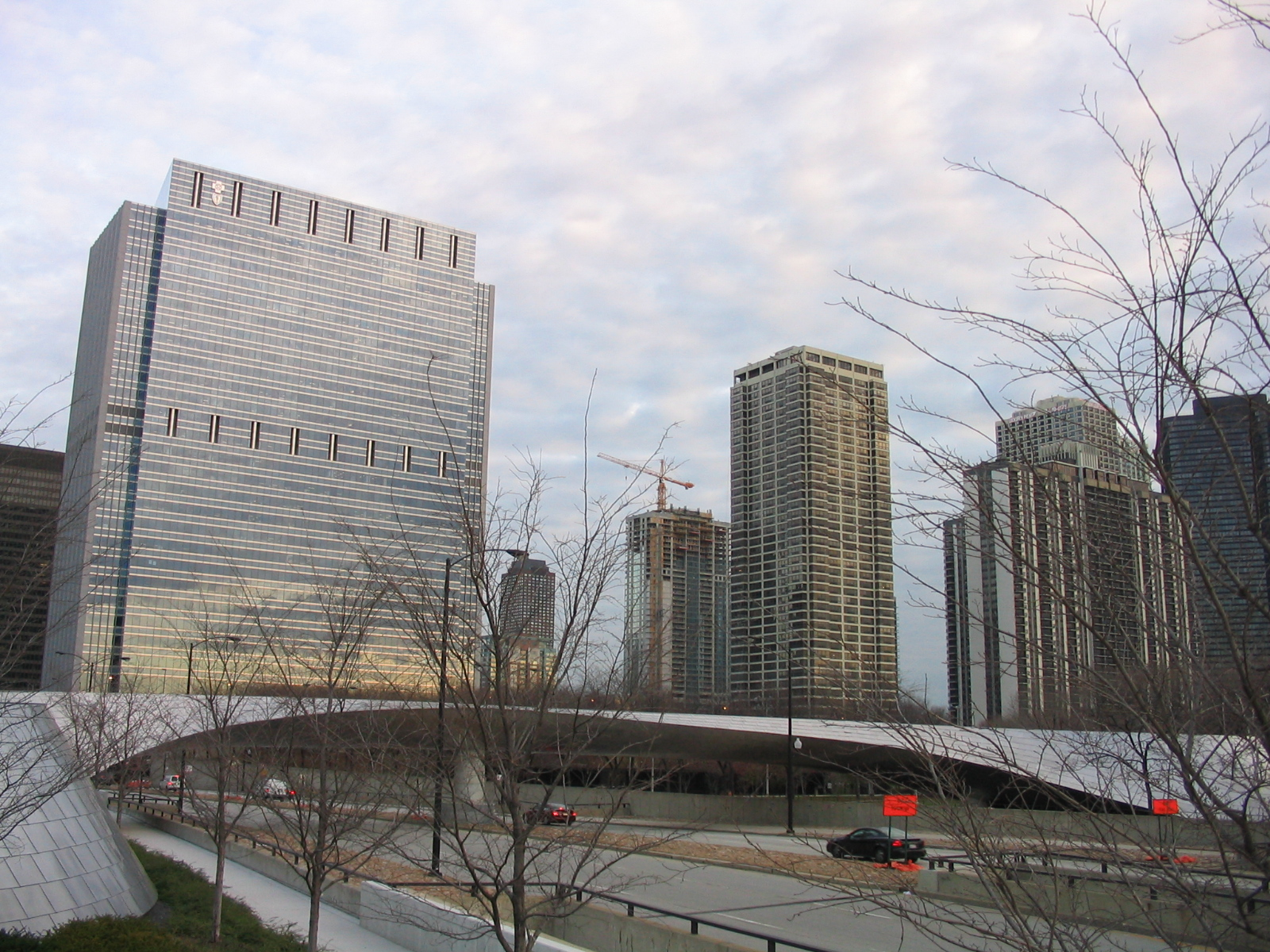
Site of 340 on the Park from BP Pedestrian Bridge

== Education ==
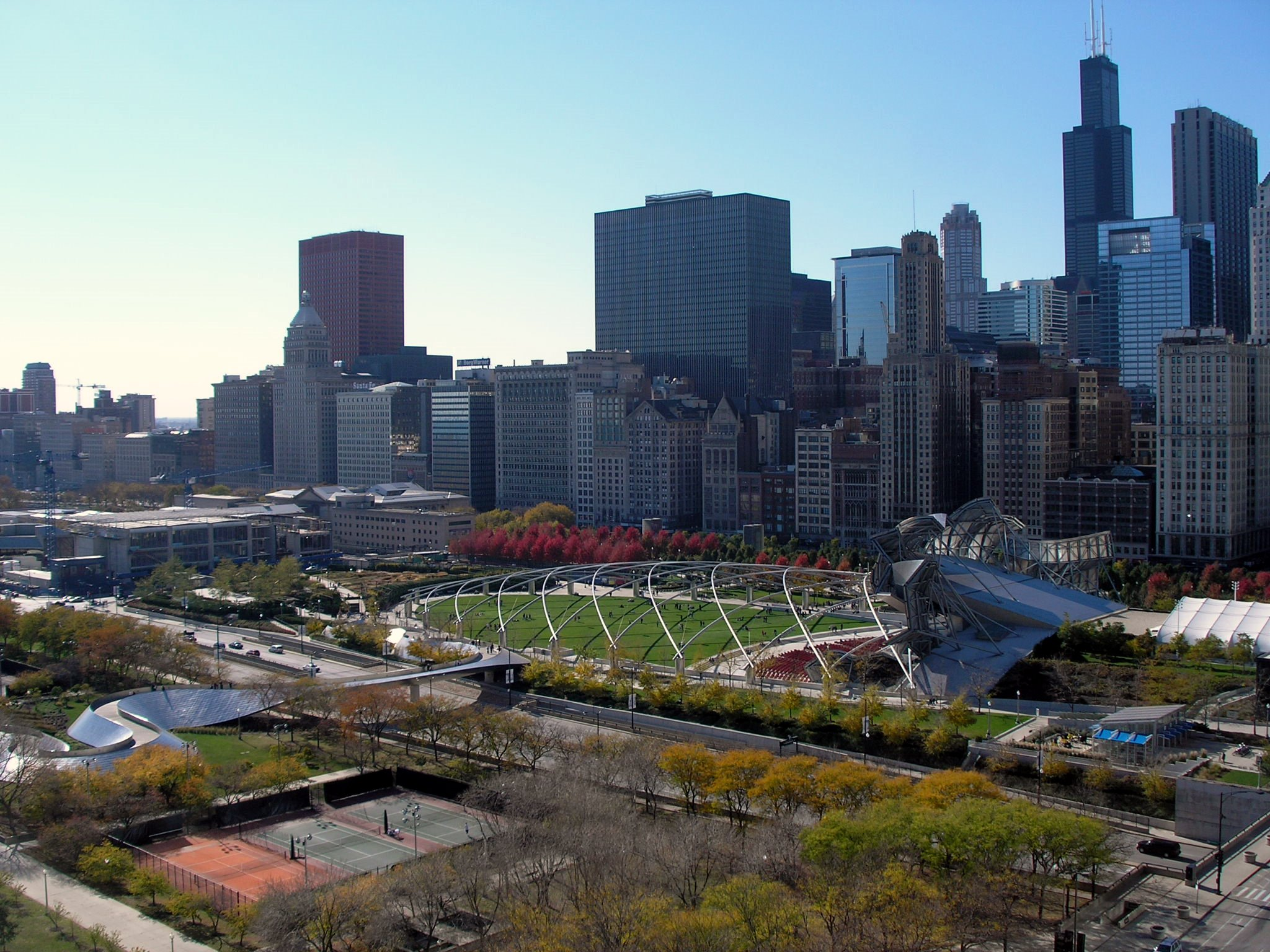
The southwest view from 340 on the Park includes Millennium Park, Art Institute of Chicago, Historic Michigan Boulevard District and Chicago Loop.

Residents of 340 on the Park are zoned to schools in the Chicago Public Schools.

- Ogden School (K–8)
- Wells Community Academy High School

== See also ==
- List of buildings
- List of skyscrapers
- List of tallest buildings in Chicago
- List of tallest buildings in the United States
- World's tallest structures

== Position in Chicago's skyline ==
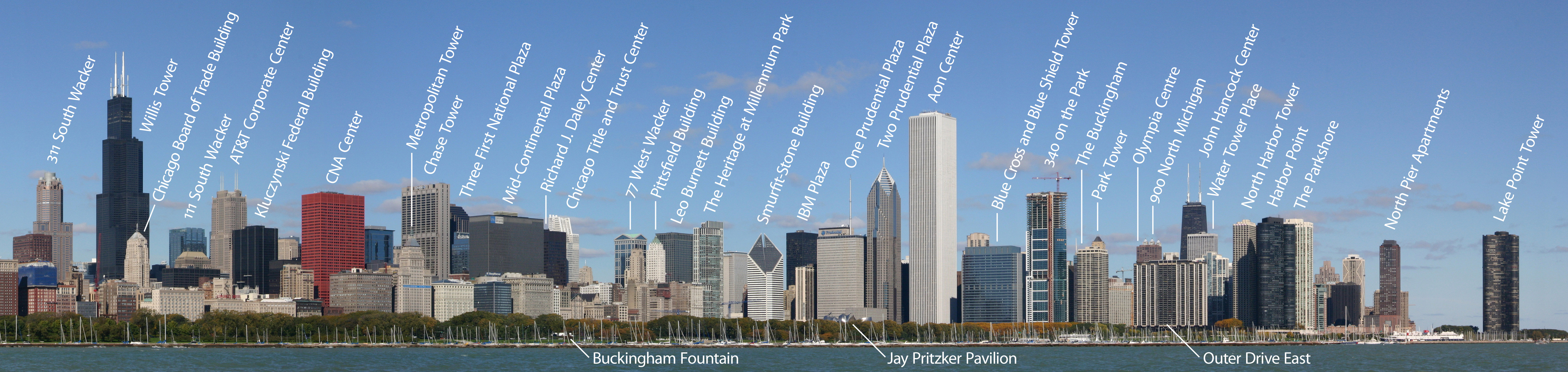
