= Mary's (Houston) =

Defunct gay bar in Houston, Texas, U.S.

- Interactive map of Mary's
- Address: Houston, Texas; United States
- Coordinates: 29.744840°N 95.392485°W

Mary's, originally called Mary's, Naturally and sometimes referred to as Mary's Lounge, was an iconic gay bar located in the Montrose neighborhood in Houston, Texas, in the United States. The bar opened in 1968, and by the time of its permanent closing in November 2009, it was the oldest gay bar in Houston and one of the oldest in Texas. In addition to being one of the most popular and well-known gay bars in Montrose, Mary's was a hub for gay political activism. In 2011, OutSmart said that the bar "anchored" Houston's gay community in Montrose during its nearly forty-year history.

== Description ==
In its early days, Mary's employed go-go boys, and originally featured a neon sign that read "Mary's Lounge" in the front of the building, which was gone by 1979. Early advertisements also referred to the bar as "Mary's, Naturally". Mary's included a jukebox and its bar tops were decorated with pictures of its patrons. Mary's also included a backyard patio and garden, known as the Outback, that had been planted in remembrance of HIV/AIDS victims; the profits from vegetables grown in this garden, along with drag queen tips, were often donated to charity. A statue of an angel, which had been there since the early days of the bar and which artist Steve Swoveland restored, stood inside Mary's and became a centerpiece for those paying their respects to the victims of the crisis. Mary's became a landmark and catered to virtually every aspect of the LGBT community.

== History ==
=== Opening ===
Mary's was opened in 1970 at the corner of Westheimer and Waugh Drive in the Montrose neighborhood of Houston, Texas. Montrose was at that time becoming a prominent gayborhood in Houston, and was the first gay bar to open on a main road, as well as to have windows.

In November 1969, Joe Anthony bought the property, which was at the time named Tommy's Lounge. The bar was owned by the widow of Tommy Musselwhite, herself also named Tommy. Joe Anthony owned the vending machines in Tommy's Lounge. One night, having spied the antique cash register, Joe asked Tommy how much she would sell it for. She $6000, but Joe could have the bar to go along with it. After finalizing the deal, Joe's son Mike reportedly said, "Well, Mary, now that you own the place, what are you gonna call it?" And Mary's Naturally was born. In January, 1974, Joe Anthony sold the bar to Jim "Fanny" Farmer. Cliff Owens became co-owner sometime in the late 1970s.

In Mary's early days, it became tradition for patrons' underwear to be hung from the rafters, until the state health department required the bar to take them down in the late 1980s. Unlike other local gay bars, Mary's never adopted a dress code. The bar also adopted a cat mascot, which they named Mr. Balls, after he began living in the area around the bar and fell out of a tree outside. Mr. Balls was given his own bar stool at the main table. In 1978, the bar's license to sell alcohol was revoked by the Texas Alcoholic Beverage Commission due to continuous code violations, including the sale of alcohol to minors, but acquired it again shortly after by listing Farmer as a business partner instead of an owner.

=== June 20, 1980 police raid ===
At that time, police raids on gay bars were common. One well-known raid occurred in the early morning hours of June 20, 1980, as patrons celebrated Houston Gay Pride Week's third annual pre-opening celebration in Mary's. For the third year, the Houston Police Department raided a bar the week prior to Pride. In 1979, the police once again raided Mary's, and in 1978, the raid occurred at The Locker. Some subsequent raids were actually marked as a Pride Week event, with customers showing up just to be a part of the raid.

1980's Houston Gay Pride Week was slated to be held from June 20 to June 29, and one scheduled event was a softball game between the Houston Police and Fire Departments and the Montrose Sports Association. According to the HPD, undercover agents had been sent to the bar after receiving civilian complaints of "lewd actions" and public intoxication. Agents had been inside the bar since about 10:30 p.m. and had witnessed "illegal activities". Shortly after midnight, at 12:05 a.m., HPD and the Texas Alcoholic Beverage Commission entered the bar and arrested 61 people. Among those arrested were Mary's owner, Jim Farmer, who was also one of the Gay Pride Parade's Grand Marshals for 1980 and his assistant manager, Andy Mills.

Assistant Police Chief Tony Mitchell stated that the raid's timing with Gay Pride Week was "coincidental and unfortunate," although the raid sparked complaints and accusations of police harassment from the LGBTQ community. Witnesses at the bar said police arrested people indiscriminately, and that the crowd considered starting a riot akin to Stonewall. Farmer stated that most of those who had been arrested were not drunk and complained of previous police harassment at Mary's, and Mills recalled having seen patrons lined up against the wall and loaded into a non-ventilated police van; another witness said some of those arrested were assaulted by police and "put in on top of one another." News sources speculated that the TV cameras that arrived shortly after the raid began had been arranged or tipped off, and HPD Police Chief B.K. Johnson was not in Houston at the time of the raid. One news source, KPRC-TV, said the incident "damaged relations with the police and the gay community".

=== Closing ===
In 2002, Mary's closed for a brief time due to financial issues. However, the bar was able to stay open after it was purchased by Michael Gaitz. Its grand re-opening was held on January 12, 2003.

Mary's closed permanently in November 2009 after a long decline in attendance and financial issues, at which point it was the oldest gay bar in Houston and one of the oldest in Texas. Mary's customers began a group on Facebook to attempt to salvage and preserve furniture and other parts of the bar; after Mary's closed, looters periodically broke into the bar and stole the remaining furnishings. The property was bought by owners of a newly constructed neighboring restaurant, Anvil Bar & Refuge, in 2011. While a small shed at the back of the property was condemned and demolished, the back lot and main building were spared. The building was reopened in 2012 as a coffee shop named Blacksmith, while its back patio and lot were turned into a parking garage for neighboring businesses. The Gulf Coast Archive and Museum keeps a few Mary's artifacts on display.

== Place of gay rights activism ==
=== Political activism ===
In “The History of Gay Bathhouses,” Allen Bérubé writes “In a nation which has for generations mobilized its institutions toward making gay people invisible, illegal, isolated, ignorant and silent, gay baths and bars became the first stages of a movement of civil rights for gay people in the United States." Mary's Naturally was that bar in Houston. During the ownership of Fanny Farmer, Mary's moved from being a popular hangout to being a hub for gay rights activism and organization in Houston. Farmer frequently and financially supported the Gay Political Caucus (GPC) in Houston. He supported and participated heavily in Gay Pride Week. According to gay activist, Ray Hill, in 1980, the early planning of the Kaposi Sarcoma Foundation, the precursor for the AIDS Foundation of Houston, happened in Mary's. Later Mary's owner, Cliff Owens said in a 2002 interview, “Farmer was politically astute, and Mary’s became the place where gay men organized themselves…“The gay community’s roots are right here, in this room, in this building."

=== HIV/AIDS epidemic ===
During the HIV/AIDS epidemic, Mary's became an epicenter of fundraising efforts, as many of its oldest customers became victims. One of Houston's first HIV/AIDS advocacy groups, the KS/AIDS Foundation, was established at a meeting at Mary's. In its backyard, trees and shrubs were planted in memoriam of HIV/AIDS victims, and some deceased patrons had their ashes scattered there. Mary's also held memorial services for the bereaved, which numbered around 300. One estimate by bar regular John Paul Jones said patron deaths sometimes averaged three per month.

These memorials and interments of remains took place in Mary's Outback, the back patio area at Mary's Naturally. Unfortunately, this site has now been paved over as a parking lot for a coffee shop, without a dedicated plaque or historical marker to commemorate those in the community who lost their lives in the AIDS epidemic.

This list is by no means exhaustive and was generously compiled by Brandon Wolf and the Houston ARCH Project, archived by JD Doyle's Obituary Project []:

1. Baldoso, Manny

2. Bartlow, Mitch

3. Beauregard, Gary

4. Braswell, Russell Wayne - 'Pinky Flashwell'

5. Burroughs, Jack

6. Buschlen, John

7. Cayton, Jerry Brock

8. Davis, Marvin – 'Lady Victoria Lust'

9. Denning, Lee

10. Denton, Carl Jr.

11. Dunwoody, Dennis

12. Farmer, Jim – 'Fannie' (urn buried in Out Back mound, marked by Sugar Maple tree)

13. Gray, Bill

14. Harris, Floyd - 'Shorty' (near big Live Oak, middle of west side)

15. Lampkin, Paul

16. Liddel, Tommy – 'Torchy Lane'

17. Lippert, Lief

18. Livingston, Rita (Hibiscus was planted, but remains went to Flagship Pier)

19. Lococo, Vince

20. Kennedy, Robert - 'Ethel'

21. Mathis, Judy

22. McAdory, Michael 'Mac' Houston

23. Miesch, Mike

24. Millen, Michael Joseph

25. Parks, Randolph (shot glass of Smirnoff released with balloons; memorial plant)

26. Phillips, John Paul

27. Roberts, Carol Lea 'Carolyn'

28. Roberts, Jerry

29. Robinson, Tim

30. Rujous, Frank - 'Rita Charles'

31. Ryan, Chuck

32. Schall, Don (ashes planted with white Crepe Myrtle tree in Out Back)

33. Sebastian, Nate

34. Smith, Marc

35. Smith, Terry

36. Sommers, BJ

37. Saylors, Michael

38. Unknown, Parker (marked by tombstone)

39. Unknown, Unknown ('Mad Madge')

40. Wadford, Tony – 'Eartha Quake'

41. Warren, Billy

42. Wenckus, Jon (purple Dendrobium Orchid sprays tied to balloon releases)

43. Williamson, David Earl - 'Meg'

44. Woods, Don

45. Christofoletti, Gary Pat

&. Numerous Other Houston GLBT Community Members (estimates are between 200 and 300)

Pets

1. Farmer, Jim - German Shepherd 'Sam'

2. Roberts, Carol Lea - Several Pets

3. Scott, Doug ('Dog Lips') - Dog

&. Numerous Other Pets

A cylinder-shaped time capsule is also buried in Mary's Outback, placed there in the 1970s by the Houston Motorcycle Club.

When Farmer died of AIDS in 1991, Gaye Yancey and Terry Smith adopted his share of the bar. Farmer was cremated and his urn was buried in the back lot of Mary's, under a tree.

== Murals ==
Between 1990 and 1999, gay artist Scott Swoveland painted more than 500 scenes on the four-paneled Plexiglas front window once per week, portraying events, advertisements, tributes, and other scenes. Swoveland, who had been hired as a barback, was asked by the owner to paint the murals. His designs each took one full day to create. The Houston Police Department sometimes called in with complaints against his often suggestive designs. During the AIDS epidemic, Swoveland worked to create more jovial, upbeat memorials to combat the numerous deaths and memorial services within Houston's LGBT community. Other scenes on the outside walls portrayed Janis Joplin, a memorial to a former owner's German Shepherd, and a false window depicting the inside of the bar.

His most famous mural was painted in 1997 on the outside east wall. This mural portrayed a scene inside Mary's with bar regulars, including Swoveland; the bar's cat mascot, Mr. Balls; and two anonymous gay lovers as the centerpiece. This mural became a landmark for the Houston LGBT community. In 2006, the east wall mural was painted over with a scene depicting a blue sky, but it was restored in 2011 by an effort led by local artist Cody Ledvina after Mary's closing. The effort used the image of the cat, the only part of the original mural to be preserved, and a projected image of the original mural to trace and paint the mural onto the wall. The mural was vandalized within 12 hours of being painted, but it was quickly restored.
