= Legacy at Millennium Park =

Condominium building in Chicago, Illinois

The Legacy at Millennium Park
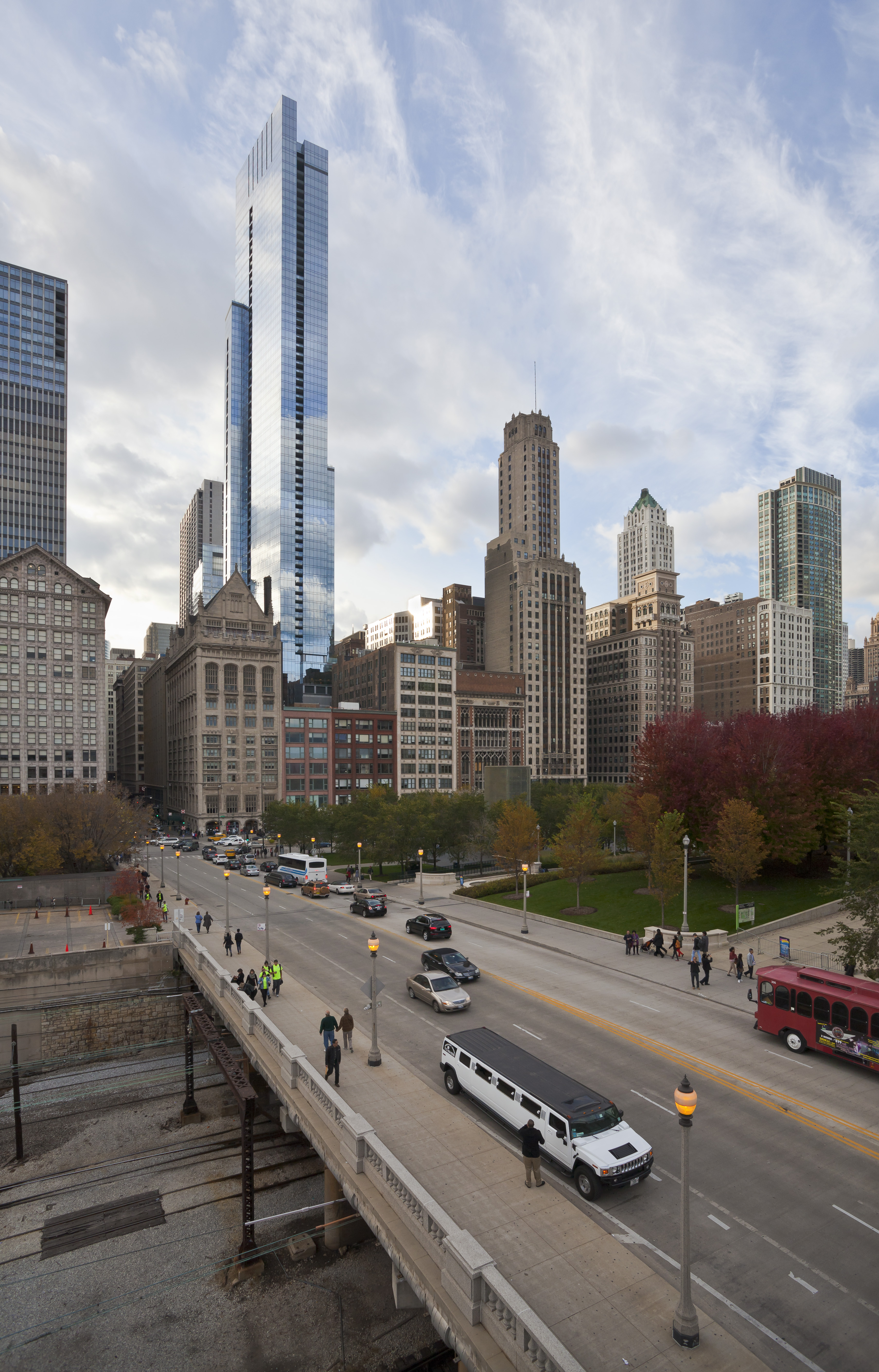
- Legacy Tower from Grant Park

- Location within Chicago metropolitan area Legacy at Millennium Park (Illinois) Legacy at Millennium Park (the United States)

General information
- Status: Completed
- Type: Mixed
- Location: S. Wabash Ave. and E. Monroe St., Chicago, Illinois
- Coordinates: 41°52′53″N 87°37′32″W
- Construction started: 2006
- Completed: 2009

Height
- Roof: 819 ft (250 m)

Technical details
- Floor count: 72
- Floor area: 1,072,613 ft^{2} (99,649.0 m^{2})

Design and construction
- Architect: Solomon Cordwell Buenz & Associates
- Developer: Mesa Development LLC
- Main contractor: Walsh Construction Company

Website
- www.goldcoastrealty-chicago.com/loop/the-legacy-at-millennium-park-condos-for-sale-or-rent.php

The Legacy at Millennium Park is a 72-story skyscraper in Chicago, Illinois, United States, located along S. Wabash Avenue, near E. Monroe Street. At 822 feet (251 meters), it is the 18th-tallest building in Chicago.

The residential tower and mixed-use podium, designed by the architectural firm Solomon, Cordwell, Buenz, contains 360 luxury condominium units and 460 parking spaces. The building includes 41,000 sq ft (3,800 m^{2}) of classroom space for the School of the Art Institute of Chicago in the lower floors, athletic facilities for the neighboring University Club, a sky-bridge between the University Club and the building podium, and private amenities for tower residents including an athletics and aquatic center as well as residential lounges located throughout the tower. The building preserves the historic masonry and terracotta facades of the Chicago Landmark Jewelers Row District along Wabash Avenue.

The building's narrow design is intended to maximize vantage points to Lake Michigan and Millennium Park from all residences in the tower.

== See also ==
- Facadism
- The Heritage at Millennium Park
- List of tallest buildings in Chicago
- List of tallest buildings in the United States
- List of tallest buildings in the world
- List of tallest residential buildings in the world
