= Lahey Health =

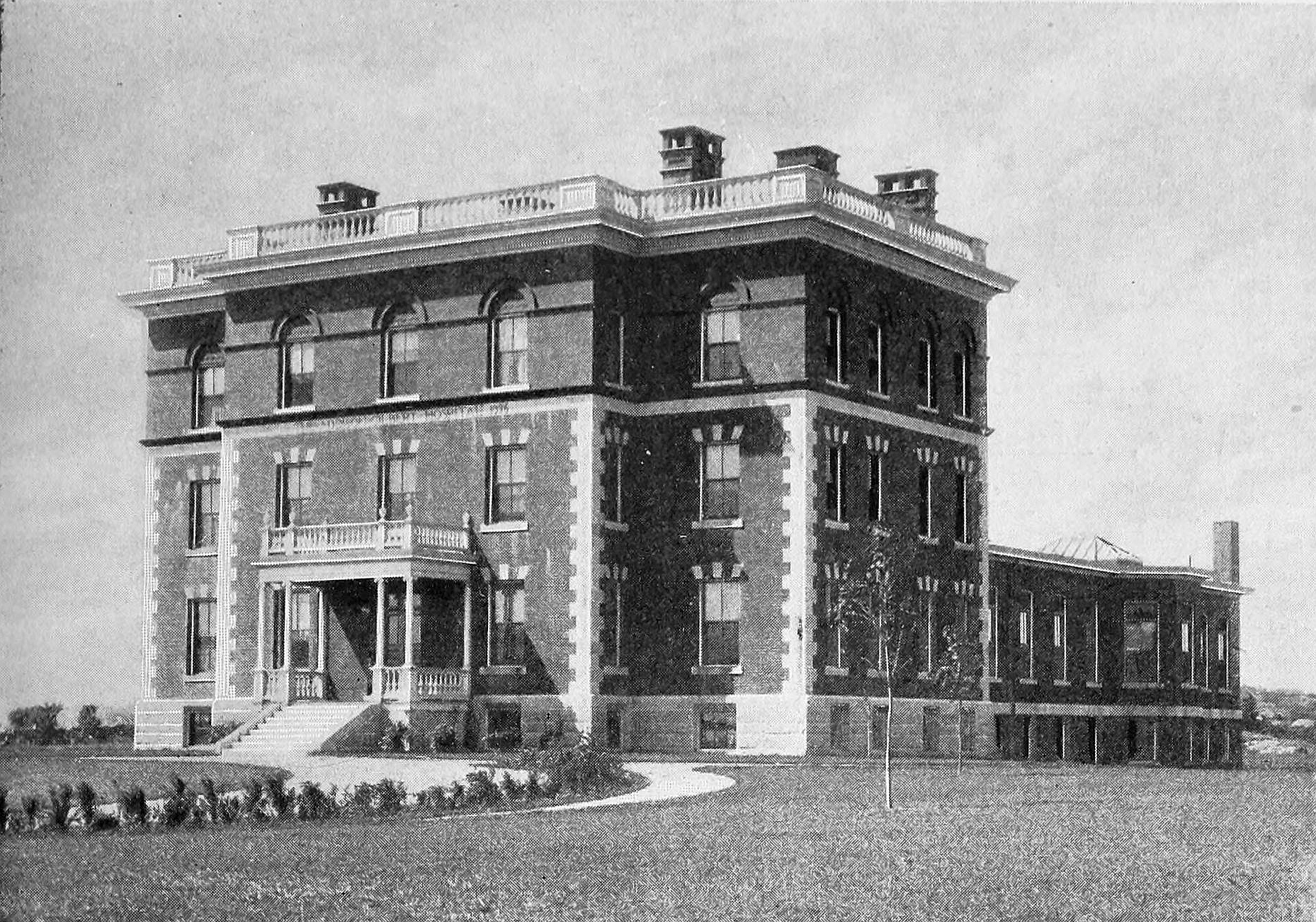
Addison Gilbert Hospital, Gloucester, Massachusetts, circa 1887

Lahey Health System, commonly known as Lahey Health, was an organization based in Burlington, Massachusetts. It managed hospitals, physicians and other health services in northeastern Massachusetts. When formed in 2012, the organization was estimated at a value of $1.2 billion dollars. As of 2013, it had hospitals in Burlington, Peabody, Beverly, and Gloucester, including Lahey Hospital & Medical Center, Beverly Hospital and Addison Gilbert Hospital.

In 2018, Lahey Health merged with Beth Israel Deaconess Medical Center's health system to form Beth Israel Lahey Health.

== History ==
Lahey Health was established in 1923 by Frank Lahey, MD, with the goal to provide patients with a medical center for all of their health concerns. Lahey Health was started as a group practice and, over the past century, have grown into a physician-led nonprofit practice that offers not only medical services but is also a medical research center.

In 1980 the clinic moved from its founding location in Boston to its current location in Burlington, becoming the Lahey Clinic Medical Center.

In 2007, The Lahey Clinic Medical Center's North Shore Facility opened the Sophia Gordon Cancer Center for advanced cancer treatments.

In 2012, The Lahey Clinic Medical Center changed its name to The Lahey Hospital and Medical Center.

In 2013, The Lahey Hospital and Medical Center entered merger talks with Beth Israel Deaconess. Negotiations spanned multiple years, failing to reach an agreement, up until 2017, when a final merge agreement was signed between the two health systems.

In 2019, The Lahey Hospital and Medical Center merged with Beth Israel Deaconess to establish Beth Israel Lahey Health.
