= One Rincon Hill =

Upscale residential complex on the apex of Rincon Hill in San Francisco

One Rincon Hill South Tower
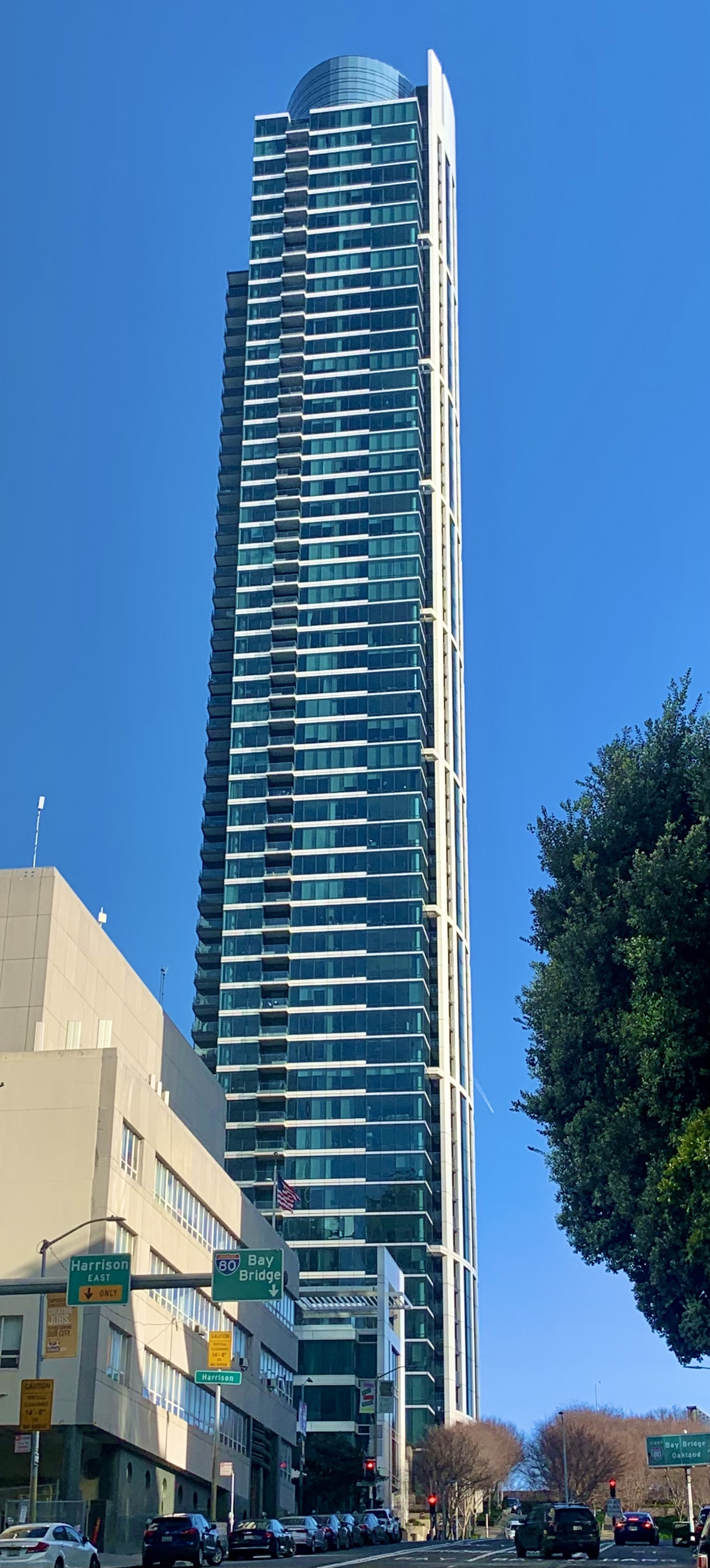
- In March 2021

- Location within San Francisco Location within California Location within the United States

General information
- Type: Residential condominiums
- Location: 425 1st Street; San Francisco, California
- Coordinates: 37.785778°N 122.392139°W
- Elevation: 32 m (105 ft)
- Construction started: November 10, 2005
- Completed: 2008
- Opened: 2008
- Cost: US$300 million

Height
- Roof: 640 ft (200 m)

Technical details
- Floor count: above ground: 60 below ground:
- Lifts/elevators: 4

Design and construction
- Architect: Solomon Cordwell Buenz
- Developer: Urban West Associates
- Structural engineer: Magnusson Klemencic Associates
- Main contractor: Bovis Lend Lease

The Harrison
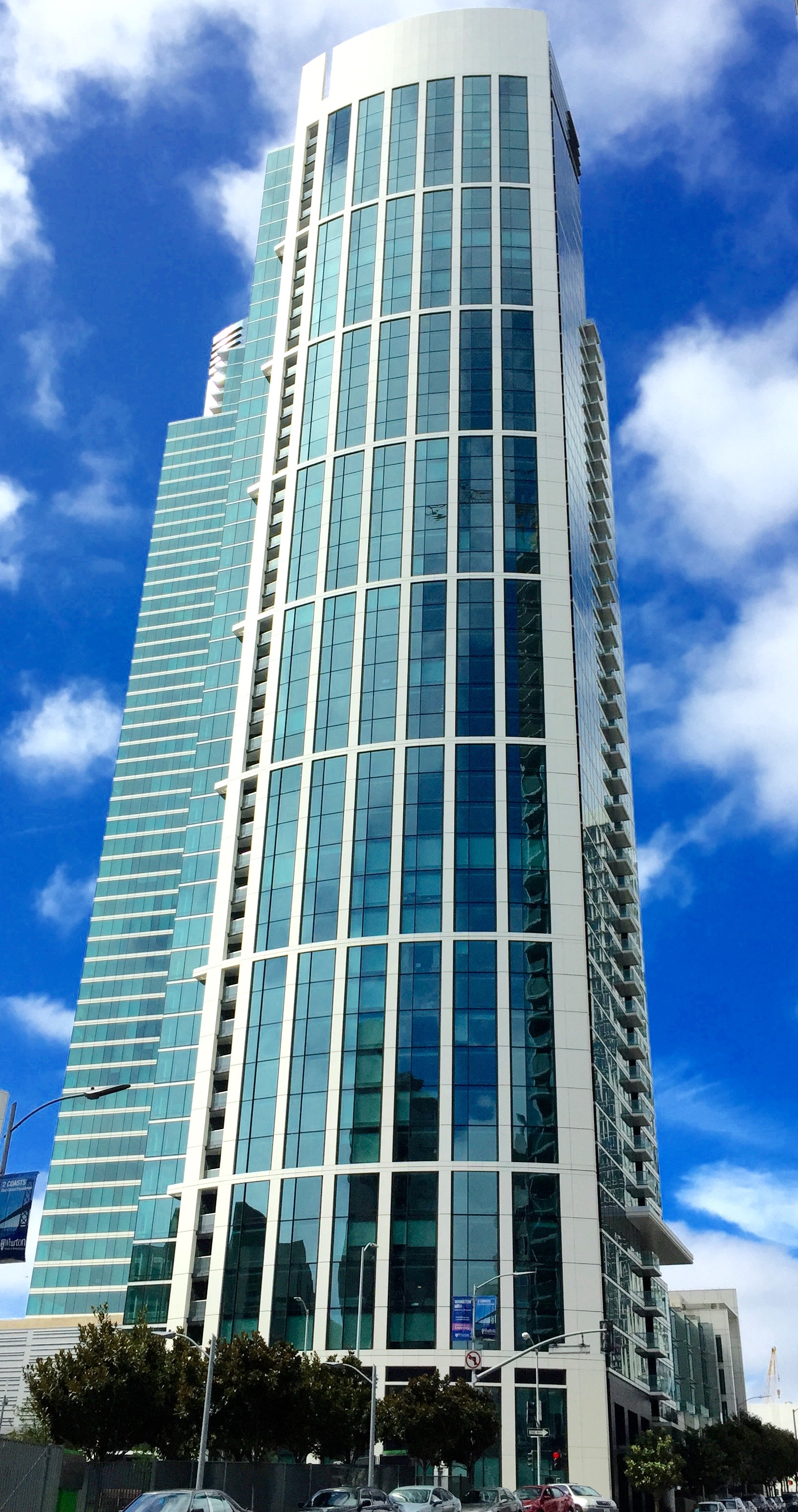
- North Tower in August 2015
- Interactive map of the The Harrison area
- Alternative names: One Rincon Hill North Tower, Tower Two at One Rincon Hill

General information
- Type: Residential condominiums
- Location: 425 1st Street; San Francisco, California
- Coordinates: 37.78636°N 122.39201°W
- Construction started: 2012
- Completed: 2014

Height
- Roof: 541 ft (165 m)^{[A]}

Technical details
- Floor count: 50^{[A]}

Design and construction
- Architect: Solomon Cordwell Buenz
- Developer: Principal Real Estate Investors and Urban Pacific Investors
- Main contractor: Webcor Builders

One Rincon Hill is an upscale residential complex on the apex of Rincon Hill in San Francisco, California, United States. The complex, designed by Solomon, Cordwell, Buenz and Associates and developed by Urban West Associates, consists of two skyscrapers that share a common townhouse podium. It is part of the San Francisco skyline and is visible from several parts of the Bay Area.

The taller tower, One Rincon Hill South Tower, was completed in 2008 and stands 60 stories and 641 feet (195 m) tall.^{[A]}^{[B]} The shorter tower, marketed as Tower Two at One Rincon Hill, was completed in 2014 and reaches a height of 541 feet (165 m) with 50 stories.^{[A]} The South Tower contains high-speed elevators with special features for moving residents effectively, and a large water tank designed to help the skyscraper withstand strong winds and earthquakes. Both skyscrapers and the townhomes contain a total of 709 residential units.

The building site, located right next to the western approach of the San Francisco–Oakland Bay Bridge, formerly contained a clock tower. The clock tower was demolished shortly after the city approved the One Rincon Hill project. Construction of the townhomes and the South Tower lasted from 2005 to 2008, but was stopped for brief periods of time due to seismic concerns and a construction accident. As the South Tower neared completion, it generated controversy concerning view encroachment, high pricing, and architectural style.

== Description ==
=== Location ===
The complex is on a 1.3 acres (0.53 ha) parcel on the apex of the Rincon Hill neighborhood. The site is bounded by Harrison Street to the northwest, the Fremont Street exit ramp to the north, the approach to the Bay Bridge (Interstate 80) on the east, and the 1st Street entrance ramp to the southwest.

=== Developer and architect ===
Solomon, Cordwell, Buenz and Associates, a Chicago architectural firm, designed the complex. The developer of this complex is Urban West Associates, headed by Mike Kriozere. The developer's headquarters are in San Diego, although all its highrise projects over 14 stories are in the San Francisco Bay Area. The Rincon Hill complex is the developer's second project in San Francisco, with the first being ONE Embarcadero South, a residential complex near One Rincon Hill and across from Oracle Park. According to the developer the total cost of the Rincon Hill project was US$290 million, rising to over US$310 million in 2009.

=== Architecture ===
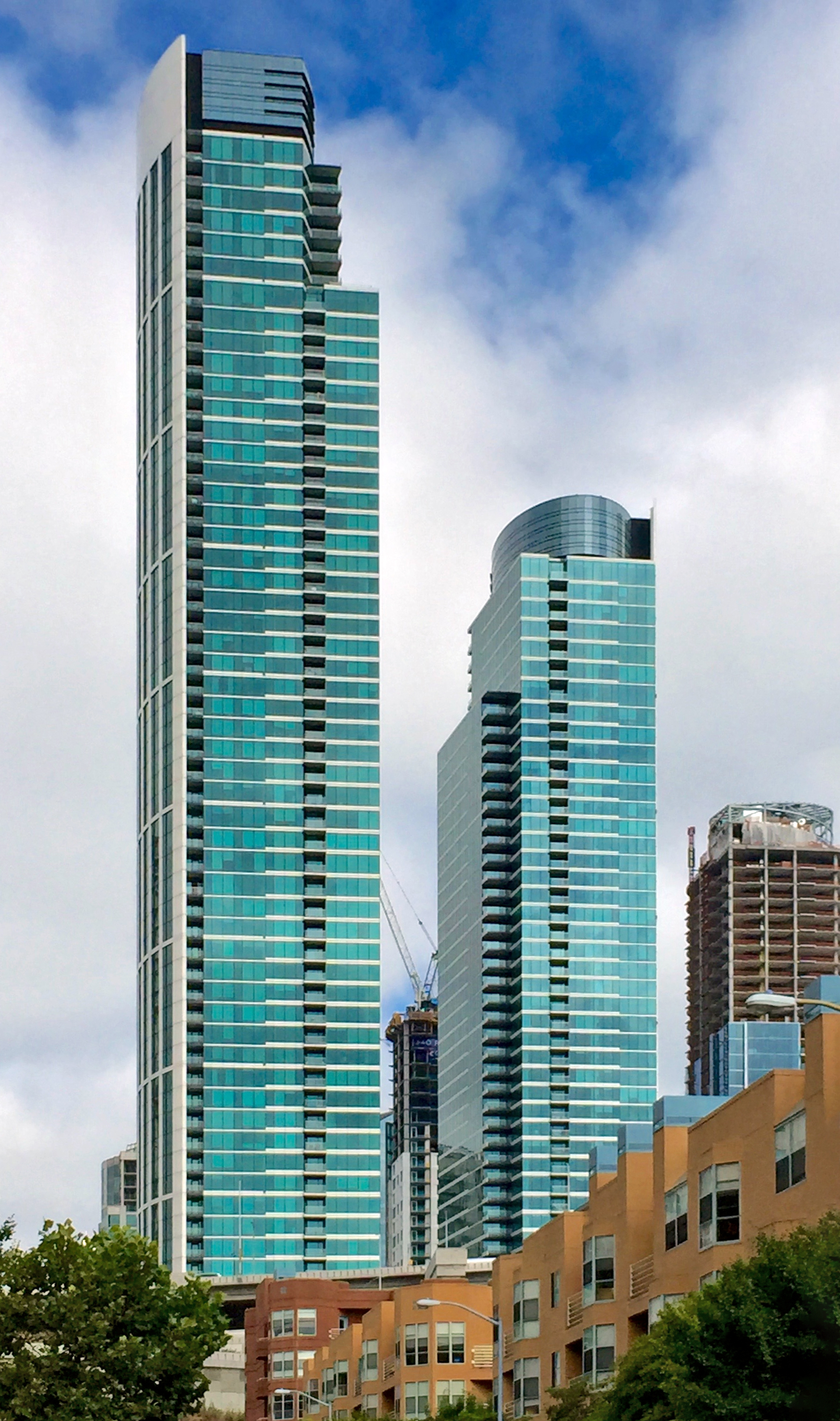
One Rincon Hill, viewed from the south in 2015

The complex consists of two buildings joined at the base by a row of townhomes. The South Tower and North Tower rise 641 and 541 ft (195 and 165 m) above the corner of Fremont and Harrison streets, respectively.^{[A]}^{[B]} The North Tower has 50 floors, while the South Tower has 60.^{[A]}^{[B]} Because of the sloped Rincon Hill site, the South Tower's lobby floor or the 1st Street entrance is on the sixth floor, and the first floor is five levels underground from the 1st Street entrance. It is also one of the tallest all-residential towers west of the Mississippi River. Its location near the apex of Rincon Hill, at an elevation of over 100 feet (30 m), gives it an apparent height of well over 700 feet (210 m), making it one of the biggest additions to the San Francisco skyline in over 30 years.

Both the north tower and the south tower of the Rincon Hill complex bear a resemblance to The Heritage at Millennium Park in Chicago, a building of a similar height to the south tower also designed by Solomon, Cordwell, Buenz and Associates. The architectural style for both buildings of the Rincon Hill complex is late-modernist. The three sides of the South Tower facing east, north, and west have a linear glass curtainwall. The North Tower has a similar design, except it is shorter and the curved aluminum and glass side faces northwest. Both skyscrapers of the Rincon Hill project contain an oval-shaped crown housing mechanical equipment.

==== Weather beacon ====
The crown of the South Tower contains a band of 25 LED floodlights that remain lit all night. Each LED light consumes little energy and has a lifetime of 40,000 hours. These lights are used to signal the weather, just like the lights on the Berkeley Building in Boston. The crown glows red if warmer weather is in the forecast. A blue crown signifies that cold weather is expected soon. Green means that there is at least a 50 percent chance of rain. Amber indicates that the weather will remain unchanged. This is the San Francisco Bay Area's first weather beacon. The crown began lighting up on December 8, 2008.

=== Earthquake engineering ===
To support the 60 story condo tower, One Rincon Hill South Tower has a massive 4-metre (13 ft) thick pile-raft foundation embedded deep into serpentine rock. Although some engineers view serpentine rock with suspicion, there are massive structures, such as the Golden Gate Bridge, that have foundations on rock that is largely serpentine. Rising out of the foundation are the concrete core and large, tall columns of steel-reinforced concrete called outriggers. The core is attached to the outrigger columns by diagonal, steel buckling-restrained braces which are designed to dissipate energy during an earthquake through controlled hysteretic behavior. This type of advanced seismic system performs in a manner similar to that of shock absorbers. The braces are also encased in concrete and steel to further mitigate risk of buckling and strength loss. Also of note is the controlled-rocking system which features vertical post-tensioning which runs the height of the building through ducts within the reinforced-concrete shear-wall core. Many of these technologies used in the One Rincon Hill South Tower have never before been applied in the United States.

=== Water tanks ===
At the top of the building is a large tuned sloshing damper which holds up to 50,000 gallons (189,250 litres) of water and weighs 416,500 pounds (185,440 kg). A similar 50,000 U.S. gallons (190,000 liters) tank is located in the basement for firefighting purposes. There are two liquid damper screens in each tank to control the flow of the water to counter the sway from the powerful Pacific winds, which can reach hurricane-force.

=== Elevators ===
The Two Towers are composed with Different Elevator Installations. The South Tower elevators were installed by Mitsubishi Electric United States with one service and three passenger elevators. The elevators are the second fastest in the city of San Francisco, second only to those in 555 California Street and tied with those in 555 Mission Street. The elevators of the South Tower can travel from the ground floor to the 61st floor (the mechanical level) in only 26 seconds to speed passenger traffic flow. This means the elevators can travel about 1,200 vertical feet (366 m) in a minute. The elevators have artificial intelligence control systems that figure out passenger traffic patterns and dispatch the three elevators to handle passenger needs accordingly. The bottom of each elevator shaft has a cylinder filled with hydraulic oil to stop a falling elevator without injuring the passengers inside. The North Tower elevators were installed by Otis Worldwide Corporation with SkyRise Motors and serving 49 floors. The service elevator serves all of the floors, as well for the 50th floor (the mechanical level).

=== Residences ===
The entire project will provide 695 condos in the highrises and 14 townhomes at the foot of the towers for a total of 709 units. 376 of those condo units are located in the South Tower and the North Tower contains the other 319 units. Because of their height, both towers will offer spectacular vistas of the surrounding landscapes. There are 26 different floor plans for the 695 condos which are financially beyond the reach of many citizens residing in San Francisco. The units vary greatly in price from US$500,000 to US$2.5 million depending on view and the size of the unit that range from 600 to 2,000 ft^{2} (56 to 186 m^{2}). The project opened up a sales office on June 16, 2006, and even before the opening, condo-buyers placed deposits for 130 of the South Tower's 376 condo units in a selling spree. The Sales Center is rumored to have cost US$2 million to build. The condo units in One Rincon Hill South Tower sold well for an unfinished building at that time. The first residents began moving into the South Tower in February 2008.

== History ==
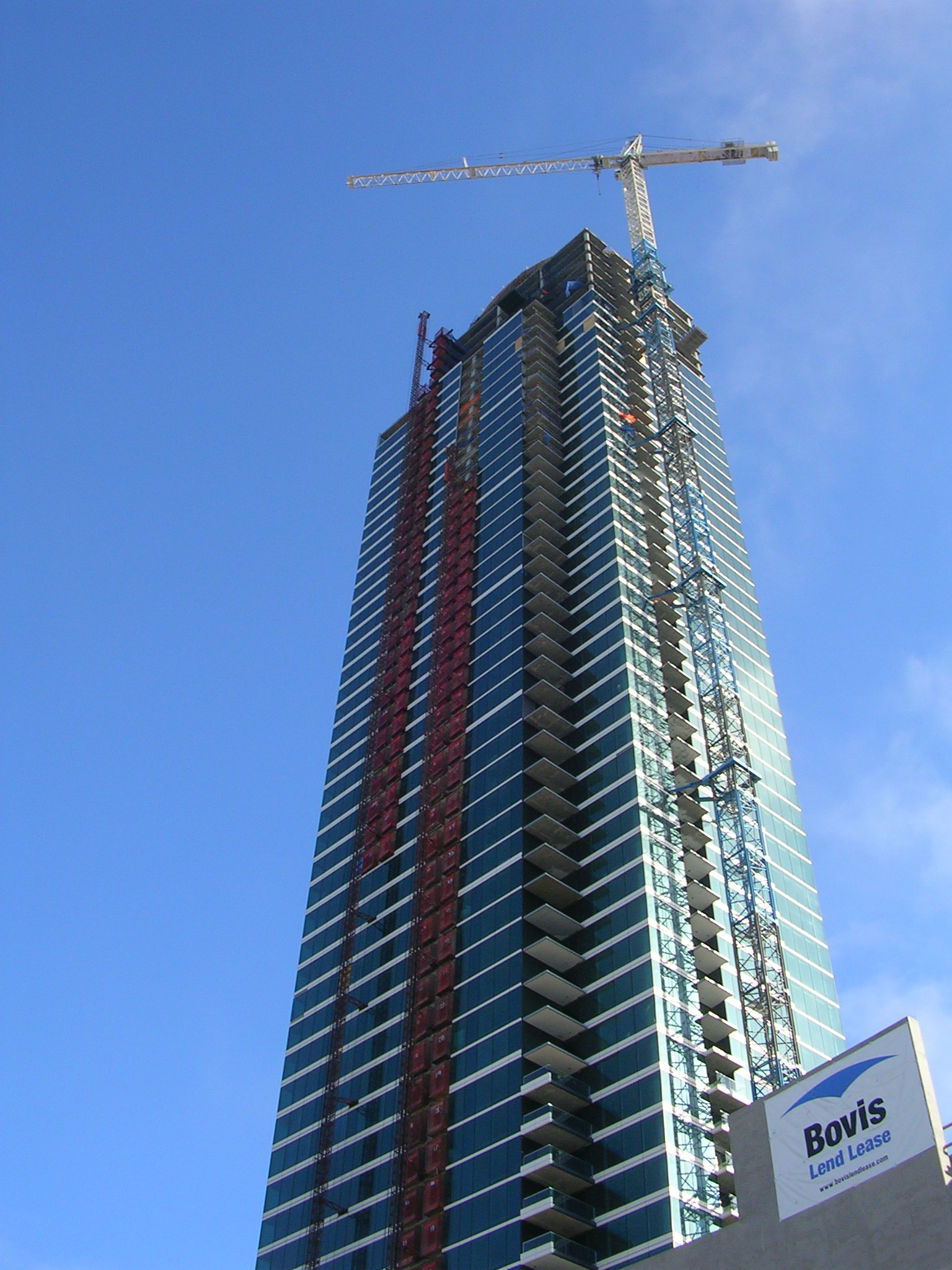
South tower in mid-July 2007

=== Prelude ===
The 183 ft (56 m) triangle-section clock tower, owned by Union 76 and then Bank of America, was built on the site circa 1955. After the Transbay Plan the city changed the zoning in the Rincon Hill neighborhood and raised height limits. A second version of One Rincon Hill was proposed in response to these zoning changes, in which the height was increased to 55 stories. The second version project was approved by the city's Planning Commission on August 11, 2005. Before construction of One Rincon Hill, the clock tower was razed to make way for the construction of the towers.

=== South Tower ===
Three months after San Francisco approved the project, construction began on the South Tower with a groundbreaking ceremony on November 10, 2005. The South Tower was the second-tallest tower under construction in San Francisco.

==== July 2006 construction accident ====
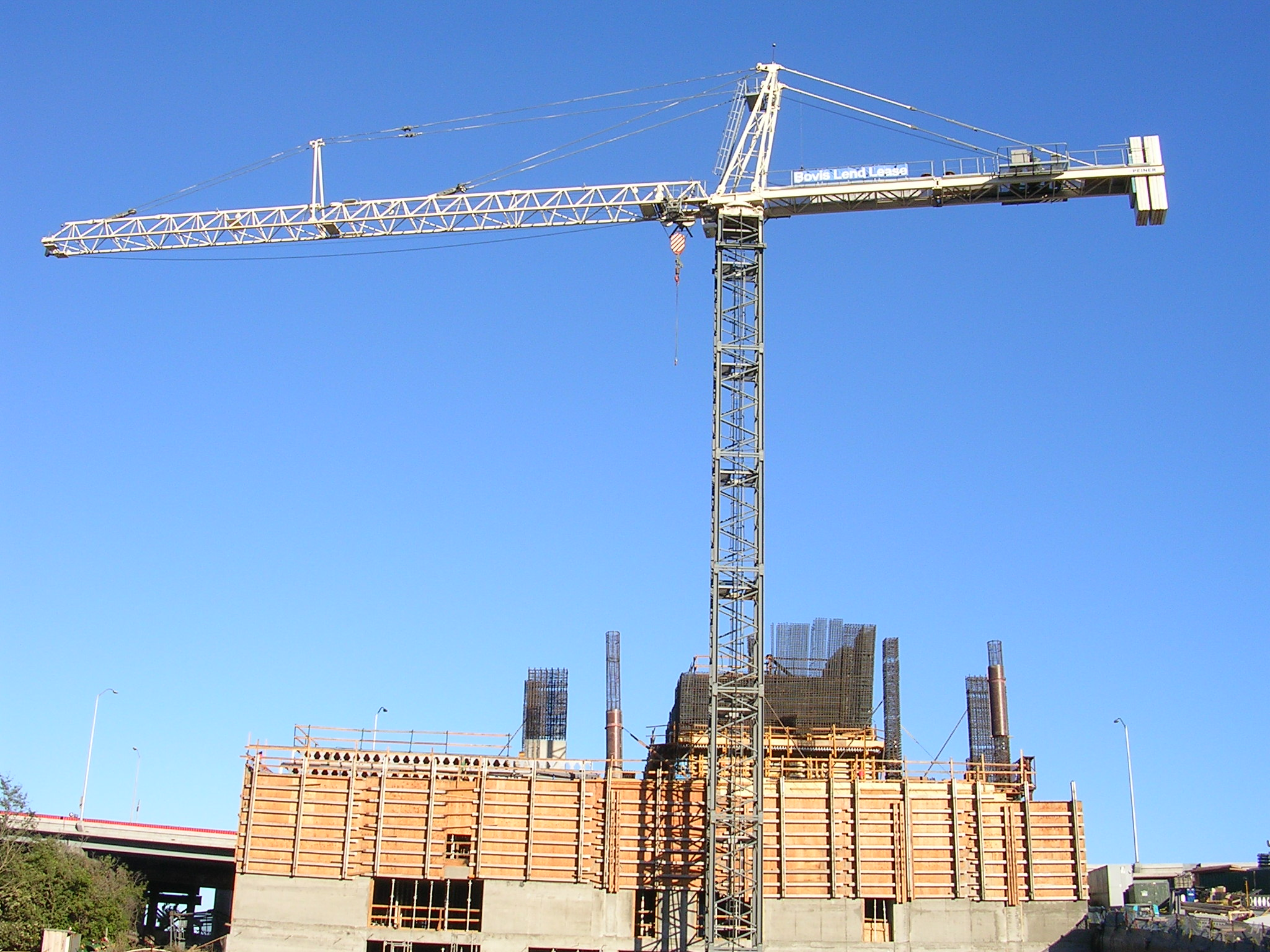
Construction site and tower crane as of July 16, 2006, a few days before the accident.

On July 21, 2006, a metal construction deck collapsed sometime around 10:45 AM (UTC−7). Two carpenters and two ironworkers were injured when they fell about 30 feet ( 2.5 stories ) feet (6 m) along with the deck, sending all four men to the hospital. Three of the men were released that afternoon; one of the ironworkers was kept at the hospital with his leg broken in two places, a broken ankle, and a broken shoulder.

==== Progress ====
The South Tower was completed in September 2008, with all residential floors ready for residents. As of, April 2009, 70% of the South Tower's 376 luxury units and 14 townhouses had been sold. Because of the occupancy rate and low profits so far, the developers had initially refused to pay $5.4 million in development fees that would be spent on rent subsidies, job training programs and community development in the South of Market area. However, the developers finally agreed to pay the city.

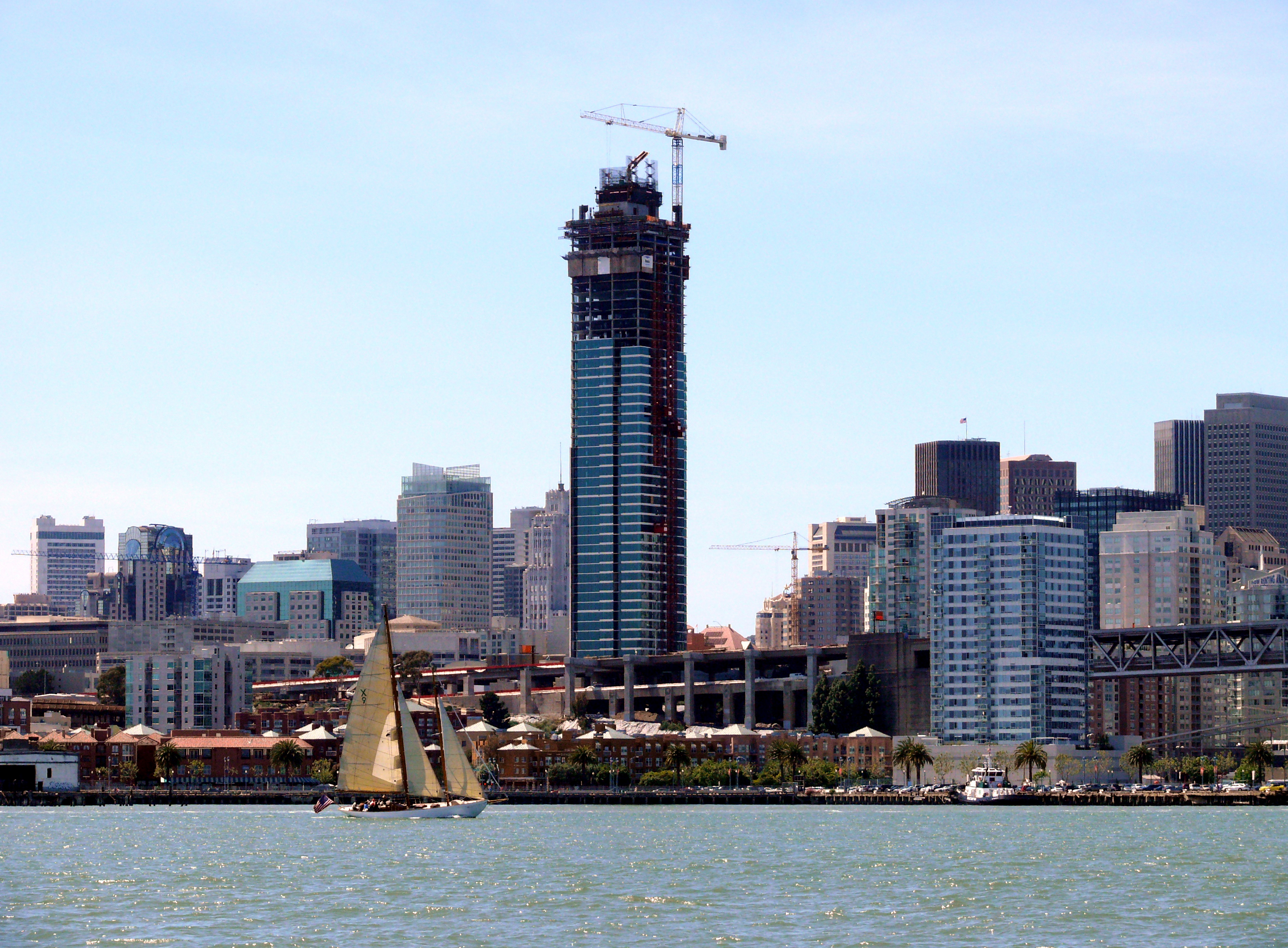
South Tower under construction in 2007

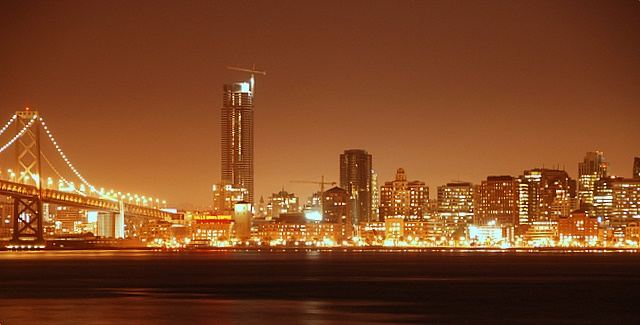
South tower in 2007

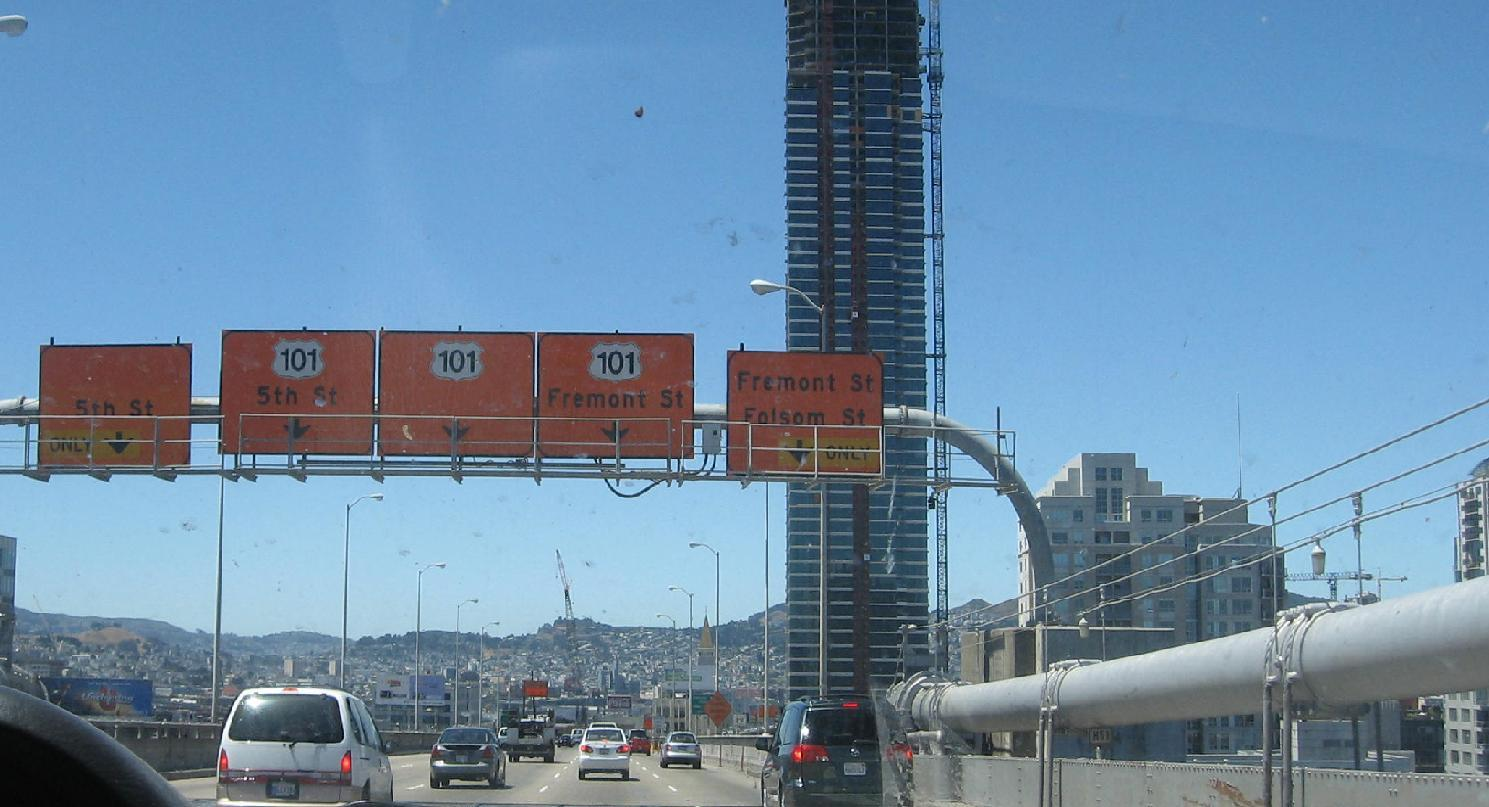
The South Tower, as viewed from the Bay Bridge, westbound, looking towards the San Francisco hills in 2007

=== North Tower ===
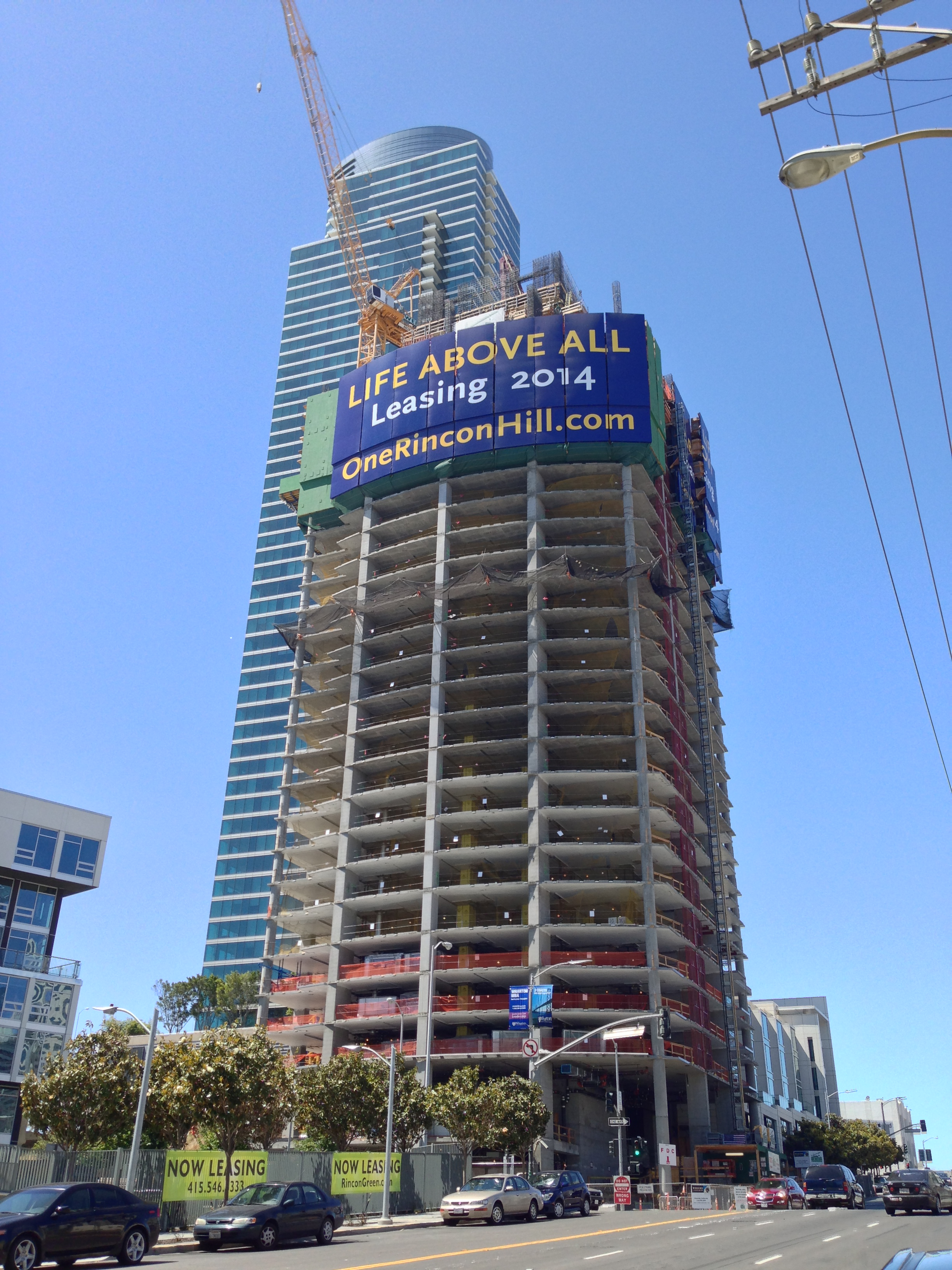
North tower under construction in June 2013

The remaining north tower was scheduled to begin construction after summer 2008 and be completed in 2009. Originally, construction was supposed to commence in January 2008. Later, the developer mentioned construction was going start in March, but the construction firm wasn't selected at that time. After March, the developer said construction was going to start in May 2008. However, due to the 2008 financial crisis, construction of the second tower was indefinitely put on hold. With improving economic conditions in the city, construction started on this tower in October 2012; its first residents moved in August 2014. The north tower was later renamed The Harrison.

== Criticism ==
With condo prices set from US$500,000 to US$2 million, many critics have noted that the One Rincon Hill complex is too expensive for most San Franciscans. With the total initial development cost of US$290 million, the average development cost per unit with 709 units total is approximately US$409,000. However, the developer Urban West Associates has contributed a total of US$38.5 million to funds like the South of Market Community Stabilization Fund in order to address this concern.

== Notes ==
A. ^{a} ^{b} ^{c} ^{d} ^{e} ^{f} ^{g} This article measures the building height and floor count of both towers from the corner of Fremont and Harrison Streets.
B. ^{a} ^{b} ^{c} ^{d} ^{e} Building height and number of floors varies depending on the measuring location and whether the five underground levels, the lobby and the topmost two mechanical levels are included in the measurement. Sources like the corresponding SkyscraperPage thread list the tower at 641 feet (195 m) tall with 60 floors, leaving out the topmost two levels. Source. However, the San Francisco project rundown thread on the same site lists the tower at 641 feet (195 m) with only 55 floors, omitting the five underground and topmost two non-residential levels. Source. Emporis lists the building at 605 feet (184 m) and omits the lobby level in addition to the seven nonresidential levels from the floor count, leading to a count of 54 floors. Source. Another site gives no height figure but mentions the tower has 62 levels. Source. At least one San Francisco Chronicle article states the building is 641 feet (195 m) tall with 62 levels, which includes the seven nonresidential levels. Source. However, another Chronicle article uses a different measuring location, stating that the south tower has 605 feet (184 m) and 60 floors. Source.

== See also ==
- List of tallest buildings in San Francisco
