= Barrier cable =

Barrier cable is a vehicular or pedestrian restraint system used in parking garages. It installed along the ramps or around the perimeter of the parking structure. It consists of a 0.5-inch, 7-wire steel strand which is similar to the strand used in Post-tensioned concrete.

== Types ==
There are three types of barrier cables systems:

=== Galvanized ===
Galvanized barrier cable is the most prevalent type of barrier cable used today. The steel strand is Zinc plated to protect it from corrosion per ASTM A475.

=== Epoxy-Coated ===
Epoxy-coated barrier cable is used on occasion for aesthetic purposes. It is significantly more expensive than galvanized barrier cable.

=== Plastic-Coated ===
Plastic-Coated is similar to the steel tendon used in Unbonded post-tensioned concrete. The only difference is that plastic-coated barrier cable does not have a layer of Post Tension coating ("grease") between the extruded HDPE plastic sheathing and the steel strand.

== Anchorage ==
Depending on parking structure, the barrier cable is installed in rows of several cables. There are several anchorage and attachment systems to concrete or steel columns.

== Specification ==
The design and installation of the barrier cable system is referenced in the Post-Tensioning Institute's Specification for Seven-Wire Steel Strand Barrier Cable Applications.

== Benefits ==
7-wire Barrier Cable has a high strength-to-weight ratio of the strands and the cables cost less to place than precast panels, traditional cast-in-place or concrete masonry barriers.
