= Solomon Cordwell Buenz =

American architecture and interior design firm

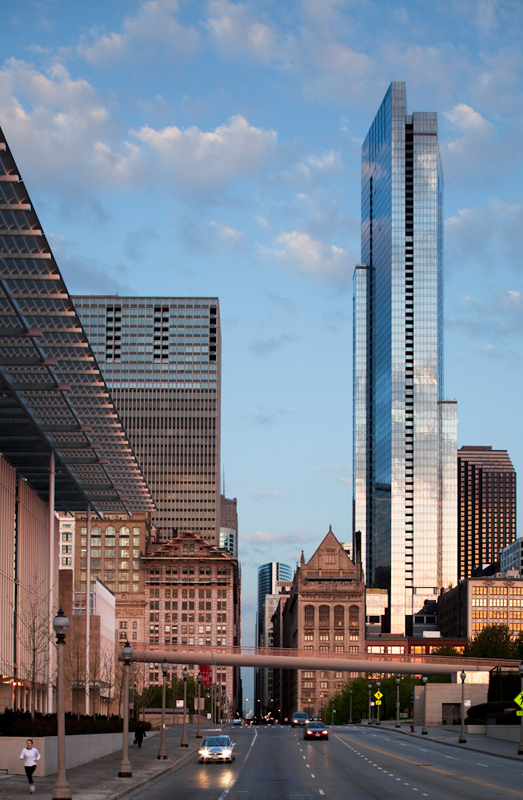
SCB designed the Legacy Tower, located at E. Monroe St and S. Wabash Ave in Chicago, Illinois.

Solomon Cordwell Buenz (SCB) is an international architecture, interior design and planning firm based in Chicago with offices in San Francisco, Boston, Seattle, and Abu Dhabi. Founded in 1931, the firm has been one of the largest contributors to Chicago's skyline.

== Projects ==
SCB has worked on 104 projects in the City of Chicago. Its most recent projects include:

Project	Year Completed	Description
340 on the Park	2007	This 62-story residential tower is the first LEED Silver all residential tower in the Midwest.
Richard J. Klarchek Information Commons, Loyola University Chicago	2008	A Silver LEED certified 69,000 sf digital research library. Uses 50% less energy than a code compliant building.
215 W Washington	2010	A 50-story residential high rise located in the loop. LEED-certified, built with sustainable materials.
Legacy Tower	2009	The 72-story multi-family residential facility is the tallest all residential building in Chicago. Also contains 41,000 sf of classroom space for the School of the Art Institute of Chicago.
Lake and Wells 200^{2}	2010/2011	Residential High-rise on the corner of Lake and Washington. One of the major high-rises built within the loop in 2009-2010. Will be ready for occupancy on Nov. 1st, 2010.
Addison Park on Clark	TBA	A sustainable, mixed-use facility across the street from Wrigley Field. Project approved by the City Council of Chicago in June 2010. Will be LEED certified.
Abu Dhabi City Centre Master Plan	2030	A 6-square-mile (16 km^{2}) multi-use development adjacent to the city's current Business District and International Airport. Will hold office space and housing for approximately 400,000 people

SCB has also designed approximately 226 buildings worldwide, including 66 office buildings, 102 urban mix use buildings, 24 retail, 27 student residences, and 7 transportation facilities in Philadelphia, San Francisco, Tucson, Serbia, Slovakia and Toronto. Examples include:

- Murano, (Philadelphia)
- Millennium Centar, (Vršac, Serbia)
- Southfield Town Center, (Detroit)
- The Streeter, (Chicago)
- One Rincon Hill, (San Francisco)
- The St. James, (Philadelphia)
- The Fordham, (Chicago)
- Library Tower (Chicago), (Chicago)
- Elysées Condominiums, (Chicago)
