= Maggie Daley Skating Ribbon =

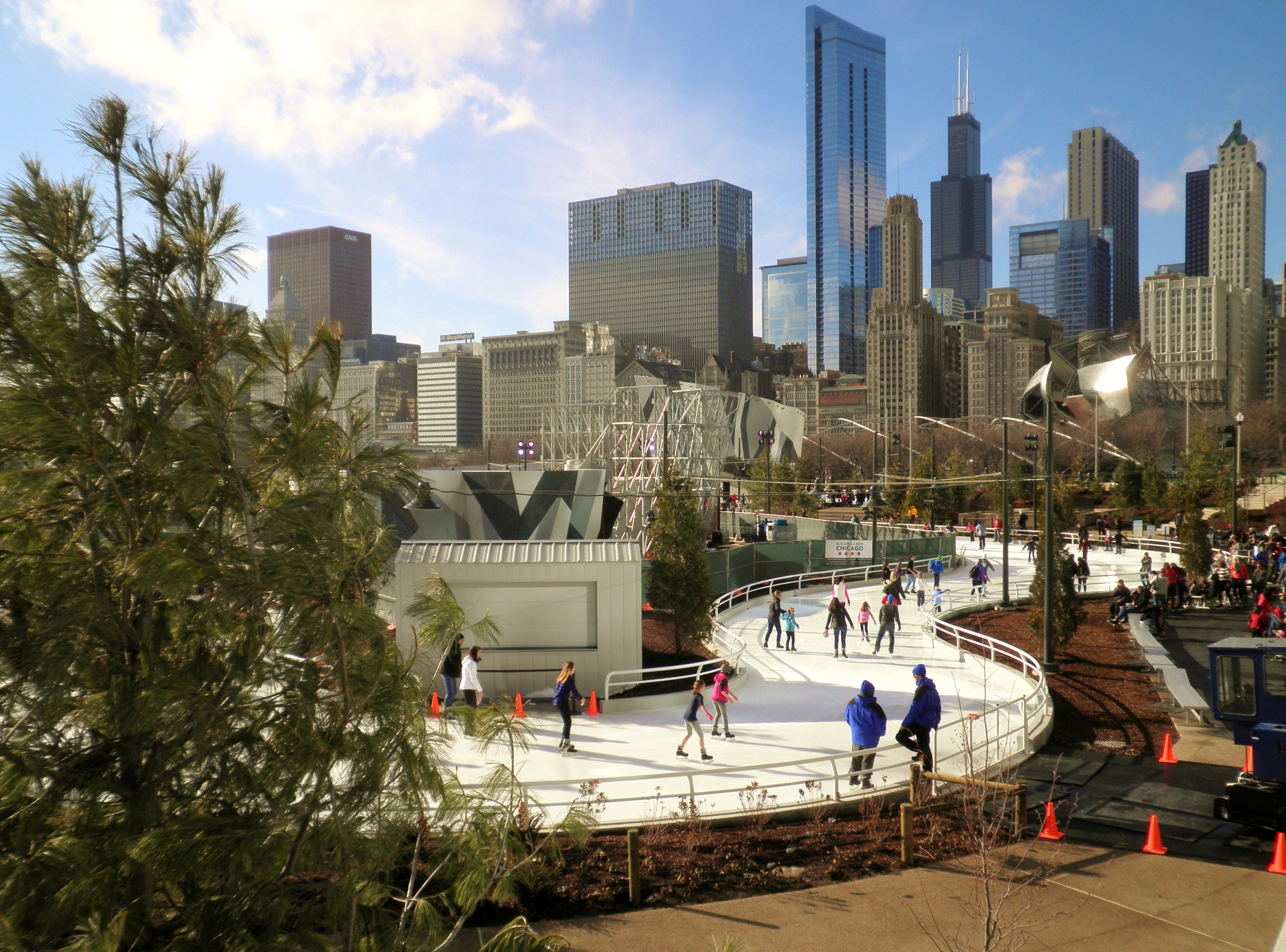
- The Maggie Daley Skating Ribbon with the Chicago skyline in the background
- Interactive map of Maggie Daley Skating Ribbon
- Location: 337 East Randolph Street; Chicago, Illinois 60601
- Coordinates: 41.883530°N 87.619104°W
- Owner: City of Chicago

Construction
- Opened: December 13, 2014

Maggie Daley Skating Ribbon is a seasonal public ice skating surface in the Maggie Daley Park section of Grant Park in the Loop community area of Chicago, which is bounded by Columbus Drive, Randolph Street, Monroe Street and Lake Shore Drive. The ice skating ribbon opened on December 13, 2014, along with the park. The rink extends for one-quarter mile (0.40 km) mile and has a capacity of 700 skaters. In the summer, the rink serves as a walking and rollerskating path. The rink features changes in elevation, which give it an incline and decline.

On November 20, 2014, the city announced that the ice skating ribbon would open on an undetermined date in December with free admission and $12 skate rentals, which was the same price structure as was being used at McCormick Tribune Plaza & Ice Rink at the time; other outdoor public skating rinks in the Chicago Park District charged a $3 admission for adults but had lower rental fees. Lockers are also available for rental for a nominal fee at the skating ribbon. Among the numerous rules for the skating ribbon is a ban on the use of smartphones while skating. In the first month, 28,000 skate rentals generated over $300,000 for the city.

The rink is closed for one-hour periods during which the ice is resurfaced by a Zamboni machine. Because of the inconvenience of frequent lengthy closure periods, the Park announces the skating schedule and resurfacing schedule daily via a dedicated Maggie Daley Park Zamboni Twitter account, @MDPZamboni.

== See also ==
- McCormick Tribune Plaza & Ice Rink
