= Maggie Daley Park =

Public park in Chicago, Illinois

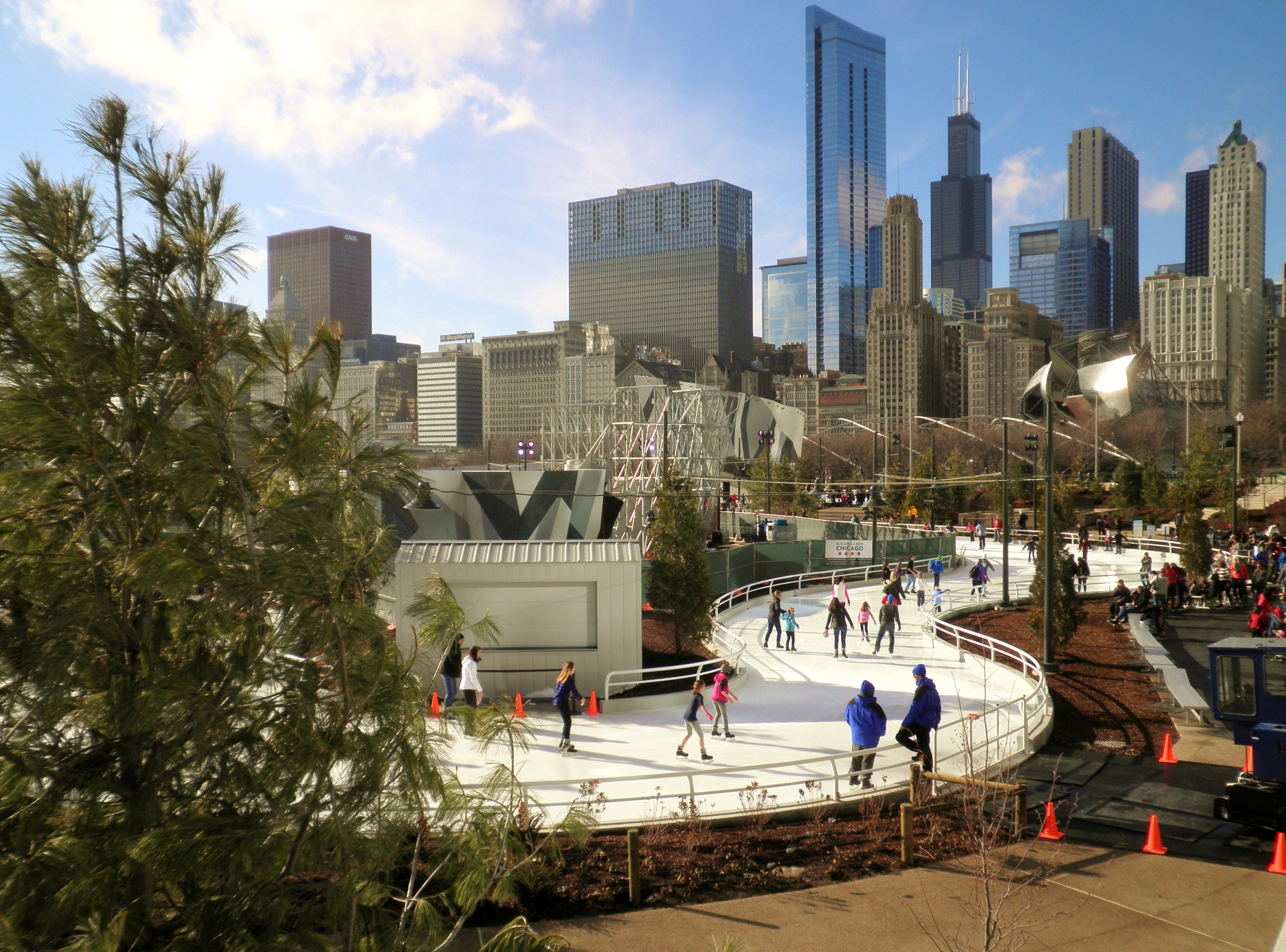
- Maggie Daley Park in December 2014
- Interactive map of Maggie Daley Park
- Type: Urban park
- Location: Grant Park; 337 E. Randolph Street; Chicago, Illinois 60601
- Coordinates: 41°52′57″N 87°37′08″W
- Area: 25 acres (100,000 m^{2})
- Created: 2012–2015
- Operator: Chicago Park District
- Open: December 13, 2014; 11 years ago
- Status: Open all year (daily 6 a.m. to 11 p.m.)
- Parking: Underground
- Public transit: Millennium Station
- Website: www.chicagoparkdistrict.com/parks/maggie-daley-park/

Maggie Daley Park is a 20-acre (81,000 m^{2}) public park in the Loop community area of Chicago operated by the Chicago Park District. It is near the Lake Michigan shoreline in northeastern Grant Park where Daley Bicentennial Plaza previously stood. Maggie Daley Park, like its predecessor, is connected to Millennium Park by the BP Pedestrian Bridge. Designed by landscape architect Michael Van Valkenburgh, the park had its ceremonial ribbon cutting on December 13, 2014, and is named for Maggie Daley, the former first lady of the city who died of cancer in 2011. The park was almost entirely remade with multiple new features including a new field house designed by Valerio Dewalt Train, an ice skating ribbon, climbing walls, landscaping and children's playground. An older section of the park maintains a garden dedicated earlier to honor cancer survivors. The park is bounded by Randolph Street, Monroe, Columbus and Lake Shore Drives. Construction took 2 years and cost $60 million, including rebuilding an underground parking lot.

== Approval process ==
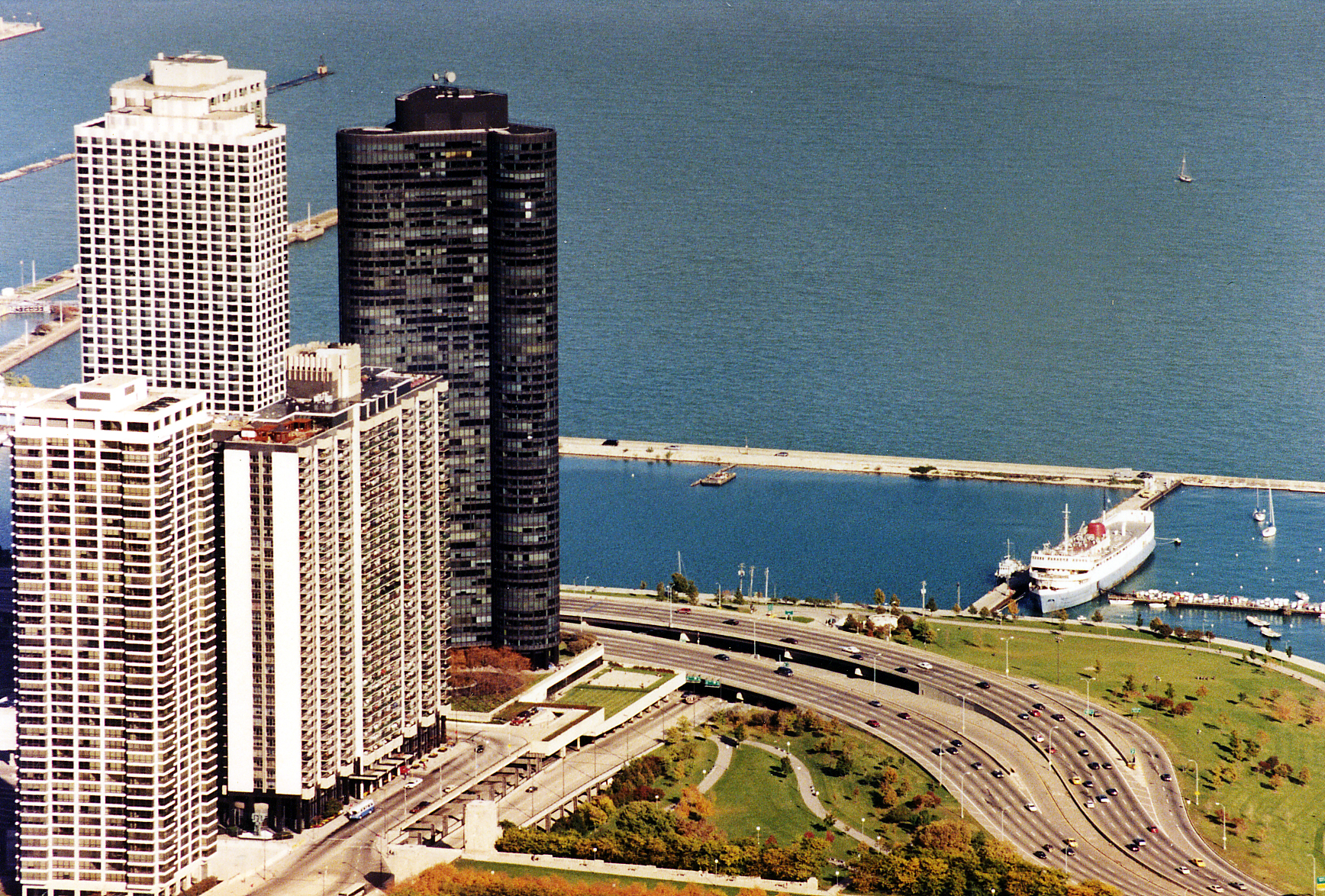
Part of the area of the current park in 1993

On August 26, 2012, Chicago Mayor Rahm Emanuel and former Chicago Mayor Richard M. Daley announced plans for the park where a hotly contested children's museum plan had previously been attempted. In 2008, the Chicago City Council had approved a $100 million plan to build the Chicago Children's Museum on the space, but legal contentions were expected to drag on regarding the use of parkland for such a structure.

== Construction ==
Preparations for construction began with closures of elements like the Daley Bicentennial field house and areas fenced off in September 2012. By November, the removal of 877 aged crab apple, magnolia, white ash, elm and other varieties of trees began. There were two stated purposes for the tree removal: the removal of the trees and soil would facilitate the repair of the underground East Monroe Street Parking Garage roof; the removal of the trees would make way for a healthier park with a broader variety of plants that were less susceptible to diseases.

== Features ==
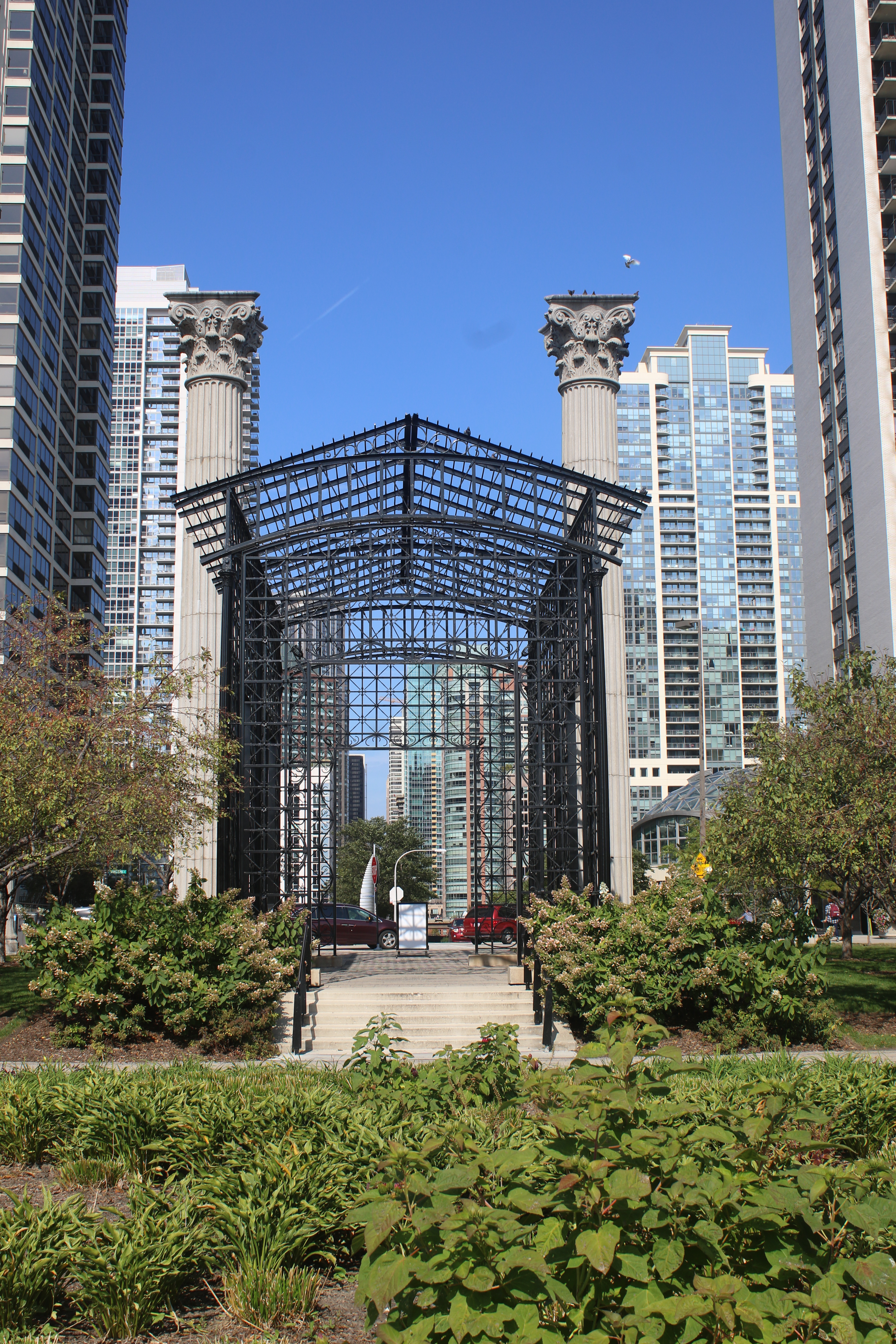
Bloch Cancer Survivors Garden entrance with pergola and the 1905 Federal Building Columns

The park features a one-quarter-mile-long (0.40 km) ice skating ribbon, rock-climbing walls, and courts for tennis and pickleball. It includes three open lawn areas, a lawn panel, a café space, and picnic groves. The northeast section retains the Richard and Annette Bloch Cancer Survivors Garden, which was laid out in 1996. The park was designed by Michael Van Valkenburgh Associates, the landscape architects for the George W. Bush Presidential Center. The former Daley Bicentennial Plaza had included 12 tennis courts and Maggie Daley Park accommodates 6 replacement courts. The courts are in the far Northeastern corner known as Peanut Park.

An additional feature of Maggie Daley Park is the Play Garden. Occupying 3 acres of Maggie Daley Park, the Play Garden is one of the many attractions within the park area. It is open from 6:00am–11:00pm, for children ages 12 and under. It contains 6 different play areas, including: The Wave Lawn, The Harbor, The Watering Hole, The Slide Crater, The Enchanted Forest, and The Sea.

The Sea is an 8,500 square foot "play loop" with several different entries, which features a large metal play ship and other interactive structures in the similar theme. It was designed for children ages 5–12.

The Enchanted Forest is a 3,590 square foot network of pathways. Overhead along the Enchanted Forest pathways are archways defined by upside-down trees, where major branches touch the ground at multiple points and a single trunk rises skyward. Within the Enchanted Forest is a Turning Stone, an upright stone that turns on its vertical axis, as well as a mirror maze (named Kaleidoscope).

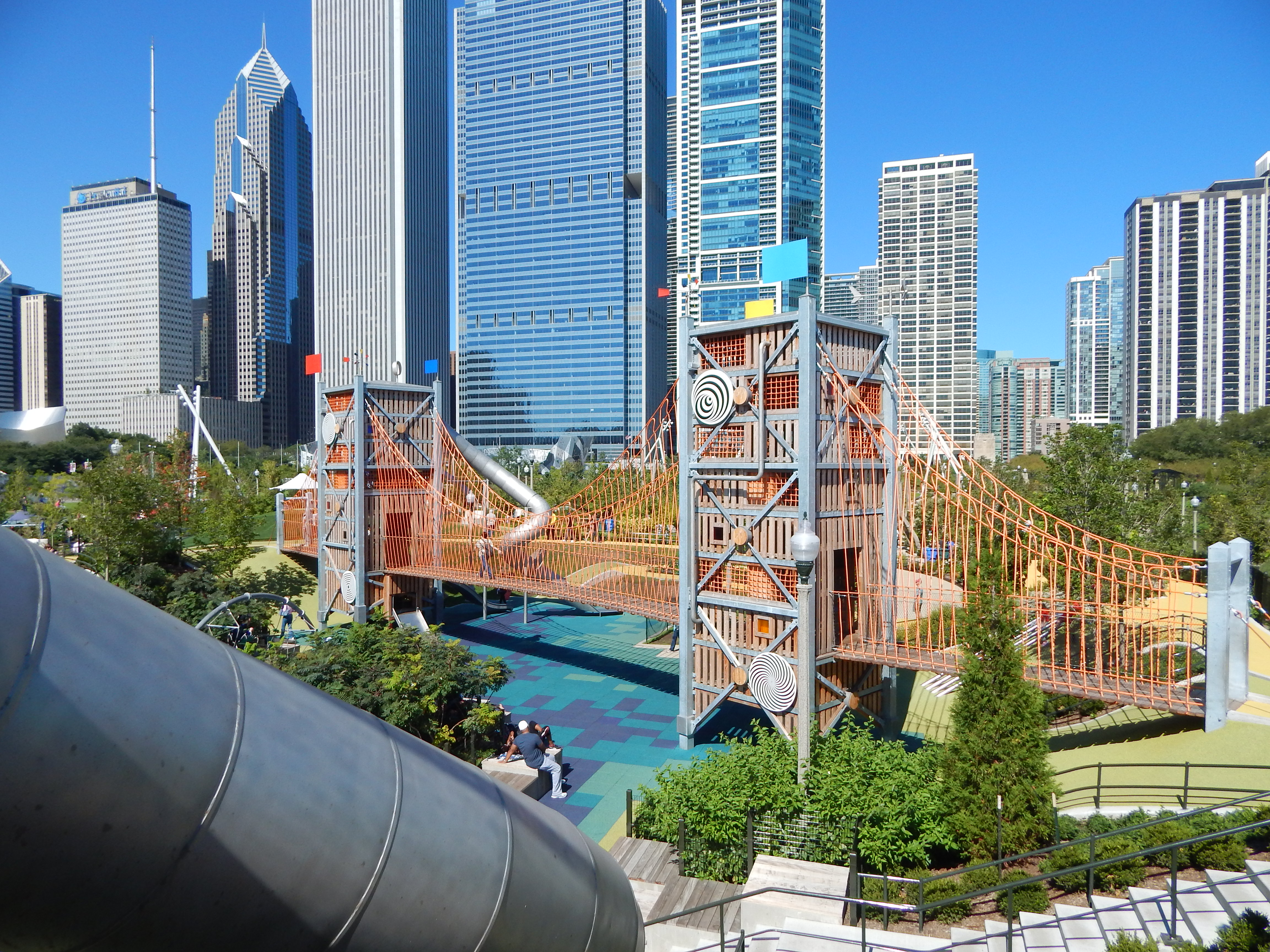
The Slide Crater within the Play Garden of Maggie Daley Park

The 12,000 square foot Slide Crater zone is entered on high from the Wave Lawn by means of the Tower Bridge, which is a suspension bridge elevated by two towers, one of which has two slides, the other a wealth of play features including knobs, flags, a viewing scope, and talk tubes. Allegedly, there are reports that the slides in The Slide Crater are unsafe and have resulted in serious injuries. The Chicago Park District denies that the slides in the playground pose a particularly high risk. "Maggie Daley Park is one of the largest and busiest playgrounds in the city; since April, an estimated 400,000 people have visited the park's playground areas. While any injury sustained at a Chicago Park District facility is one too many, the rate of incident compared to the number of people that use the park is very low. The play equipment at Maggie Daley Park was carefully selected and designated for appropriate age groups and meets criteria set by the ASTM, an international standards organization, for Playground Equipment for Public Use. As for the alleged incident occurring on 4/5/15, we have reviewed officially submitted reports and have yet to match any to the incident described by Ms. Hayes."

The Watering Hole is a 1,200 square foot animal-themed play space. It features several plastic animals, including a large whale and spouts for children to play in the water. It was designed for children ages 2–5.

The Harbor is for children ages two to five. It is 2,000ftsq in size. It features a boardwalk, three full-sized play boats, and is surrounded by the flora of the park. It is located between the swing areas of the park.

The Wave Lawn is a 16,530 square foot play area that cuts a swath through the center of the Play Garden.

A 10,000-square-foot (929.0 m^{2}) restaurant is planned for the park, but was not expected to serve the park until its second year of operation.

== Controversies ==
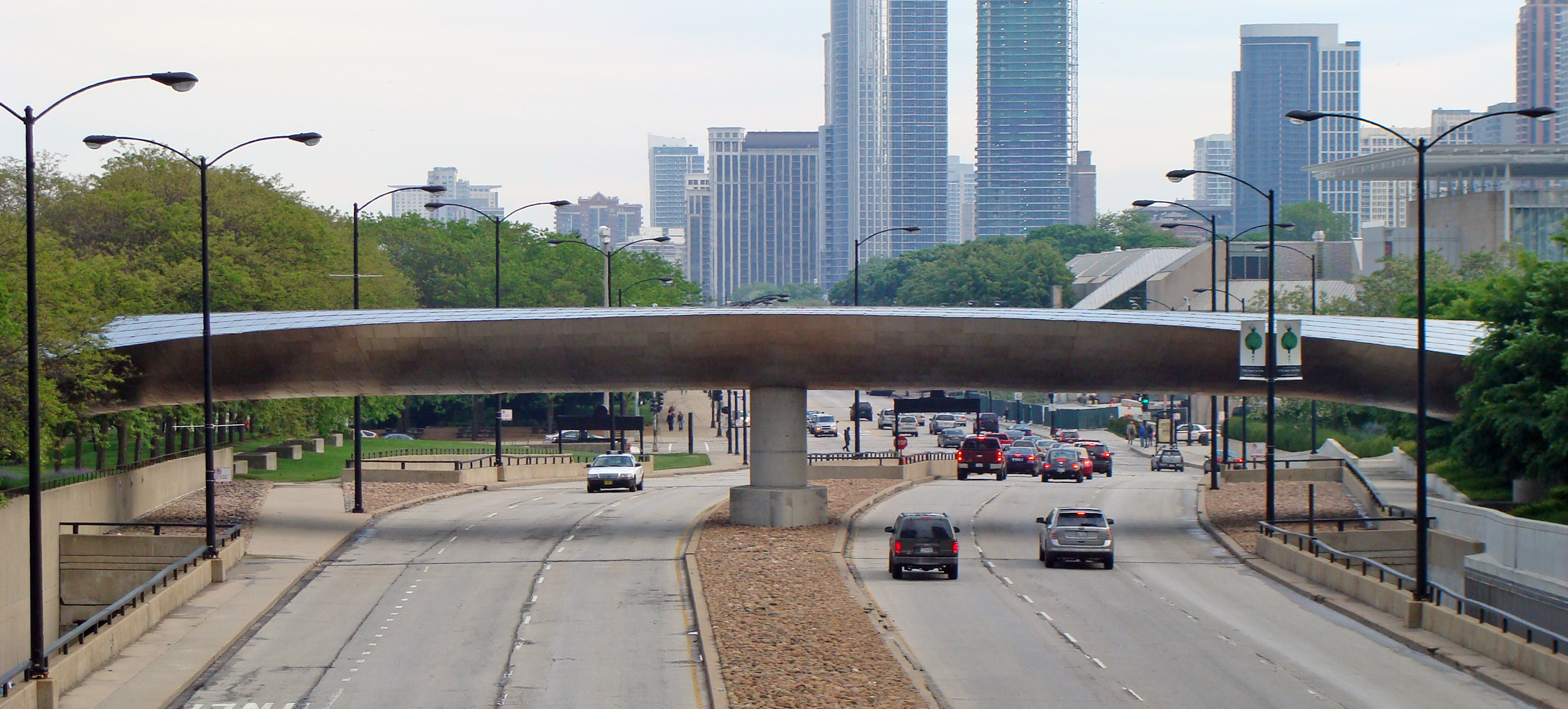
BP Pedestrian Bridge crosses Columbus Drive to connect Maggie Daley Park and Millennium Park

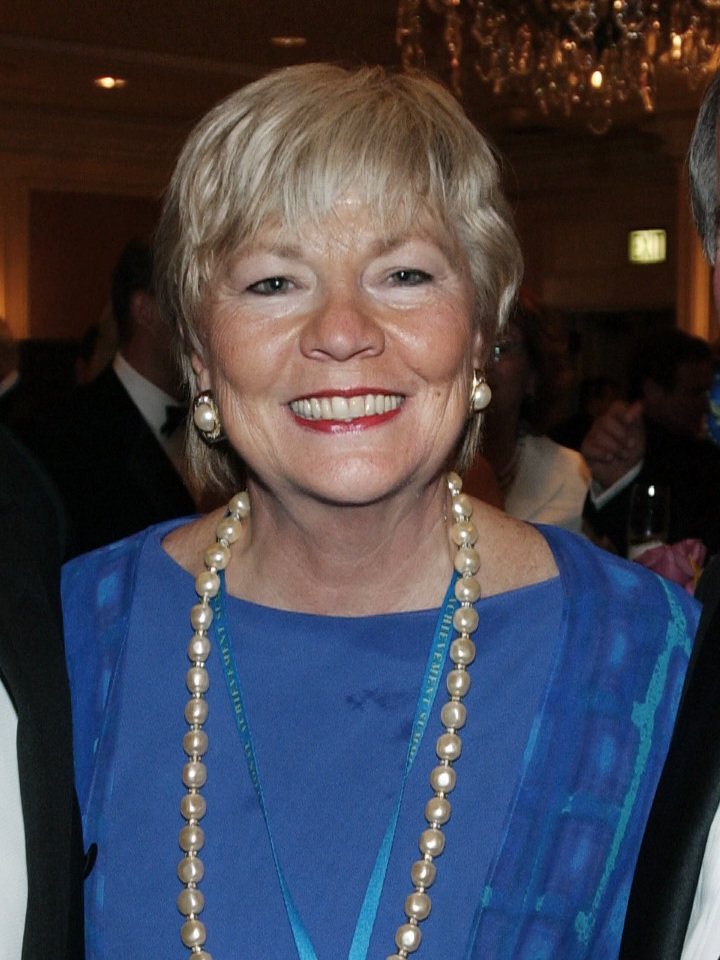
Park namesake Maggie Daley, the late wife of former Chicago Mayor Richard M. Daley (photographed in 2006)

Although the park initially had been planned as a pet-friendly zone, the decision was made to forbid dogs and other pets. During construction, 900 mature trees were removed, and 1000 young trees were planted. Only 38 pre-existing trees were planned to survive the construction, while 160 of the removed trees were marked for recycling.
