= Grant Park (Chicago) =

Urban park in Illinois, US

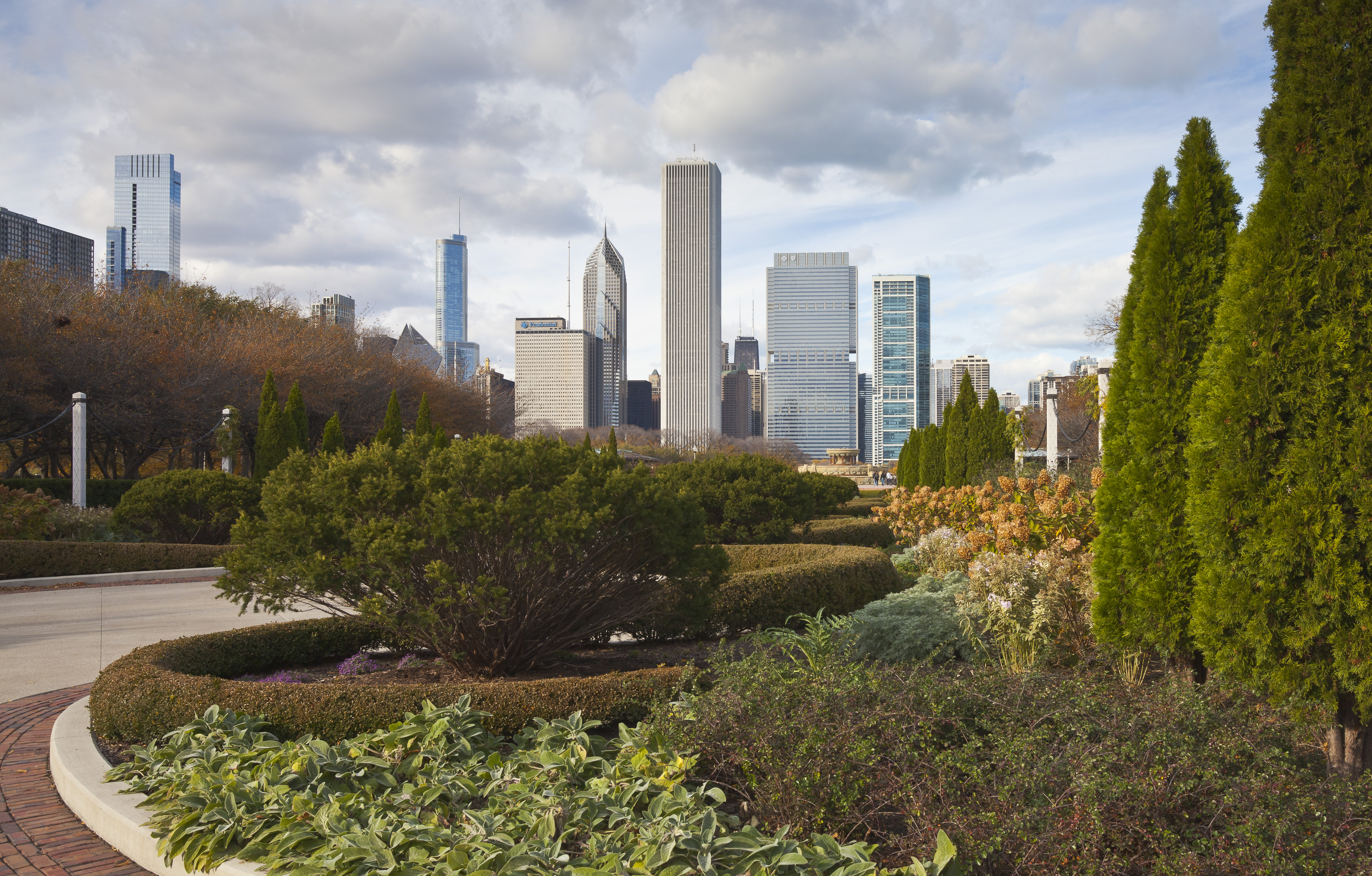
- Interactive map of Grant Park
- Type: Urban park
- Location: Chicago Loop, Chicago, Illinois, US
- Coordinates: 41°52′33″N 87°37′08″W
- Area: 319 acres (1.29 km^{2})
- Designated: 1844; 182 years ago
- Operator: Chicago Park District
- Grant Park
- U.S. National Register of Historic Places
- U.S. Historic district
- Architect: Edward H. Bennett
- Architectural style: Beaux Arts, Art Deco
- NRHP reference No.: 92001075
- Added to NRHP: July 21, 1993

Grant Park is a large urban park in the Loop community area of Chicago, Illinois. Located within the city's central business district, the 319-acre (1.29 km^{2}) park's features include Millennium Park, Buckingham Fountain, the Art Institute of Chicago, and the Museum Campus.

Originally known as Lake Park, and dating from the city's founding, it was renamed in 1901 to honor U.S. president Ulysses S. Grant. The park's area has been expanded several times through land reclamation from Lake Michigan, and was the focus of several disputes in the late 19th century and early 20th century over open space use. It is bordered on the north by Randolph Street, on the south by Roosevelt Road and McFetridge Drive, on the west by Michigan Avenue and on the east by Lake Michigan. The park contains performance venues, gardens, art work, sporting, and harbor facilities. It hosts public gatherings and several large annual events.

Grant Park is popularly referred to as "Chicago's front yard". It is governed by the Chicago Park District.

== History ==
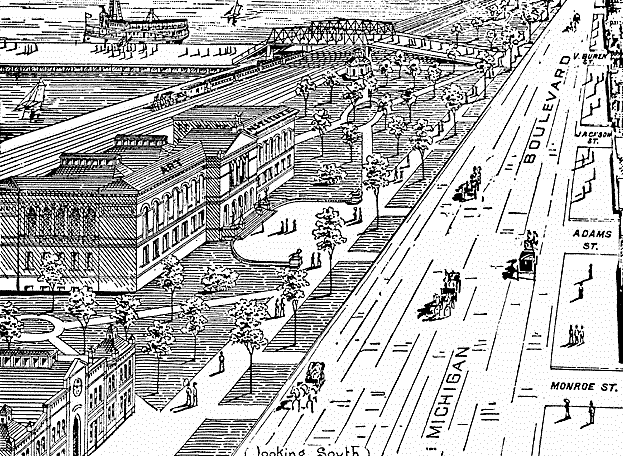
This 1893 sketch of the Art Institute of Chicago shows most of today's Grant Park area setting still Lake Michigan-claimed with railroad tracks running along the shoreline behind the Museum

Grant Park as seen in the January 1919 issue of National Geographic Magazine.

The original plans for the town of Chicago left the area east of Michigan Avenue unsubdivided and vacant, and purchasers of Michigan Avenue lots were promised that it would remain unoccupied. When the former Fort Dearborn Reserve became part of the townsite in 1839, the plan of the area east of Michigan Avenue south of Randolph was marked "Public ground. Forever to remain vacant of buildings."

The city officially designated the land as a park on April 29, 1844, naming it Lake Park. When the Illinois Central Railroad was built into Chicago in 1852, it was permitted to lay track along the lakefront on a causeway built offshore from the park. The resulting lagoon became stagnant, and was largely filled in 1871 with debris from the Great Chicago Fire, increasing the parkland. In 1896, the city began extending the park into the lake with landfill, beyond the rail lines. On October 9, 1901, the park was renamed Grant Park in honor of American Civil War commanding General and United States President Ulysses S. Grant. At the 1868 Republican National Convention in Chicago, Grant had been nominated for his first presidential term.

The legal restrictions prohibiting any buildings in the park were ignored in the 19th century, as various civic buildings were sited there. At various times, a post office, exposition center, armory, and even an early home field of the baseball club now known as the Chicago Cubs were built in the park. A 1904 plan prepared by the Olmsted Brothers recommended locating the Field Museum as the park's centerpiece, an idea integrated into Daniel Burnham and Edward H. Bennett's 1909 Plan of Chicago. Chicago businessman Aaron Montgomery Ward ultimately fought four court battles, opposed by nearly every civic leader, to keep the park free of buildings. The one exception to which Ward consented was for the Art Institute of Chicago, constructed in 1892.

In the early 20th century, Grant Park was expanded with further landfill—much of it from the excavations of the Chicago Tunnel Company—and developed with a very formal landscape design by Edward Bennett. More land fill in the 1910s and 1920s provided sites for the Adler Planetarium, Field Museum of Natural History, and Shedd Aquarium, which were linked together as the Museum Campus in 1998. In 2004, a section of northern Grant Park, previously occupied by Illinois Central railyards and parking lots, was covered and redeveloped as Millennium Park.

== Events ==
A speaker with a megaphone (left) addressing a crowd of protestors (right) at the General John Logan Memorial in Grant Park during the 1968 Democratic National Convention

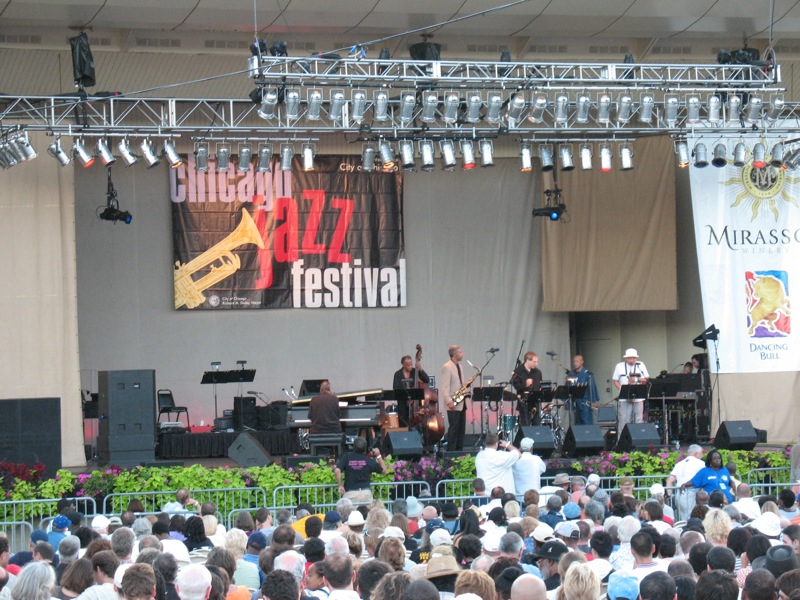
2007 Chicago Jazz Festival at Petrillo Music Shell

The park has been the site of many large civic events. It served as the staging ground for the city's funeral procession for President Abraham Lincoln in 1865. In 1911, the park hosted the major Chicago International Aviation Meet. In 1913 the AAU held the USA Outdoor Track and Field Championships. In 1959, to celebrate the opening of the St. Lawrence Seaway and a related International Trade Fair, Queen Elizabeth II, disembarked here from the Royal Yacht Britannia, giving the park's "Queen's Landing" its name. The park was the scene of clashes between Chicago Police and demonstrators during the 1968 Democratic National Convention. Pope John Paul II celebrated an outdoor mass to a large crowd here in 1979. Championship celebrations were staged here for the Chicago Bulls during the 1990s, and the Chicago Blackhawks after winning the Stanley Cup in 2013. The park was the location for President Barack Obama's Election Day victory speech on the night of November 4, 2008. In 2015, Grant Park hosted the first outdoor National Football League (NFL) draft and a related festival. The Chicago Cubs held their rally for their World Series Championship win on November 4, 2016 with an estimated 5 million people attending the parade and event.

The park annually hosts some of Chicago's biggest festivals, including The Taste of Chicago—a large food and music festival held each summer; the Grant Park Music Festival; the Chicago Jazz Festival; the Chicago Blues Festival; and Lollapalooza, a festival of rock concerts. The park is also the site of the start and finish lines of the Chicago Marathon. The annual NASCAR Chicago street race is held every year at Grant Park.

== Features ==
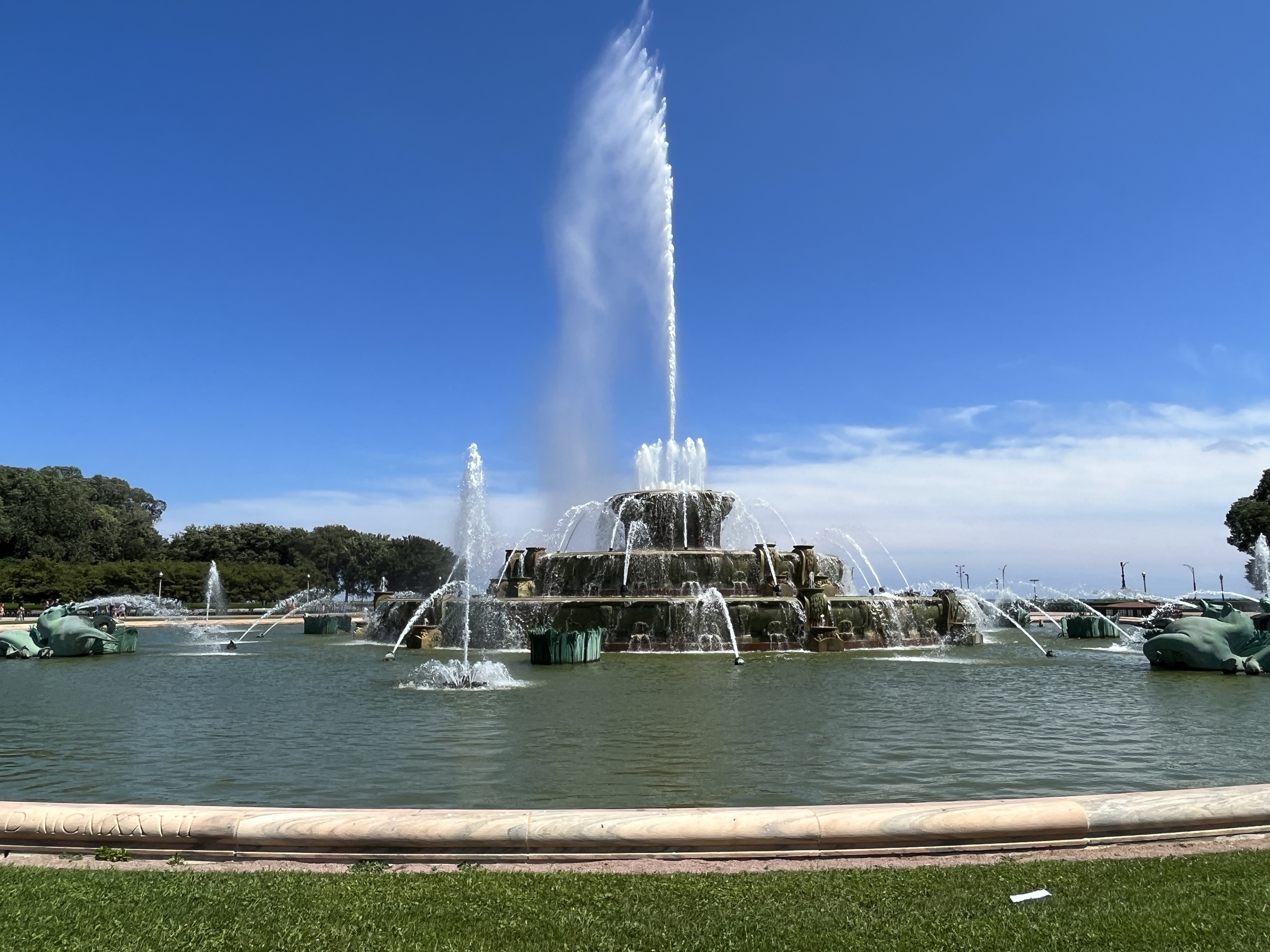
Buckingham Fountain is located in the center of Grant Park

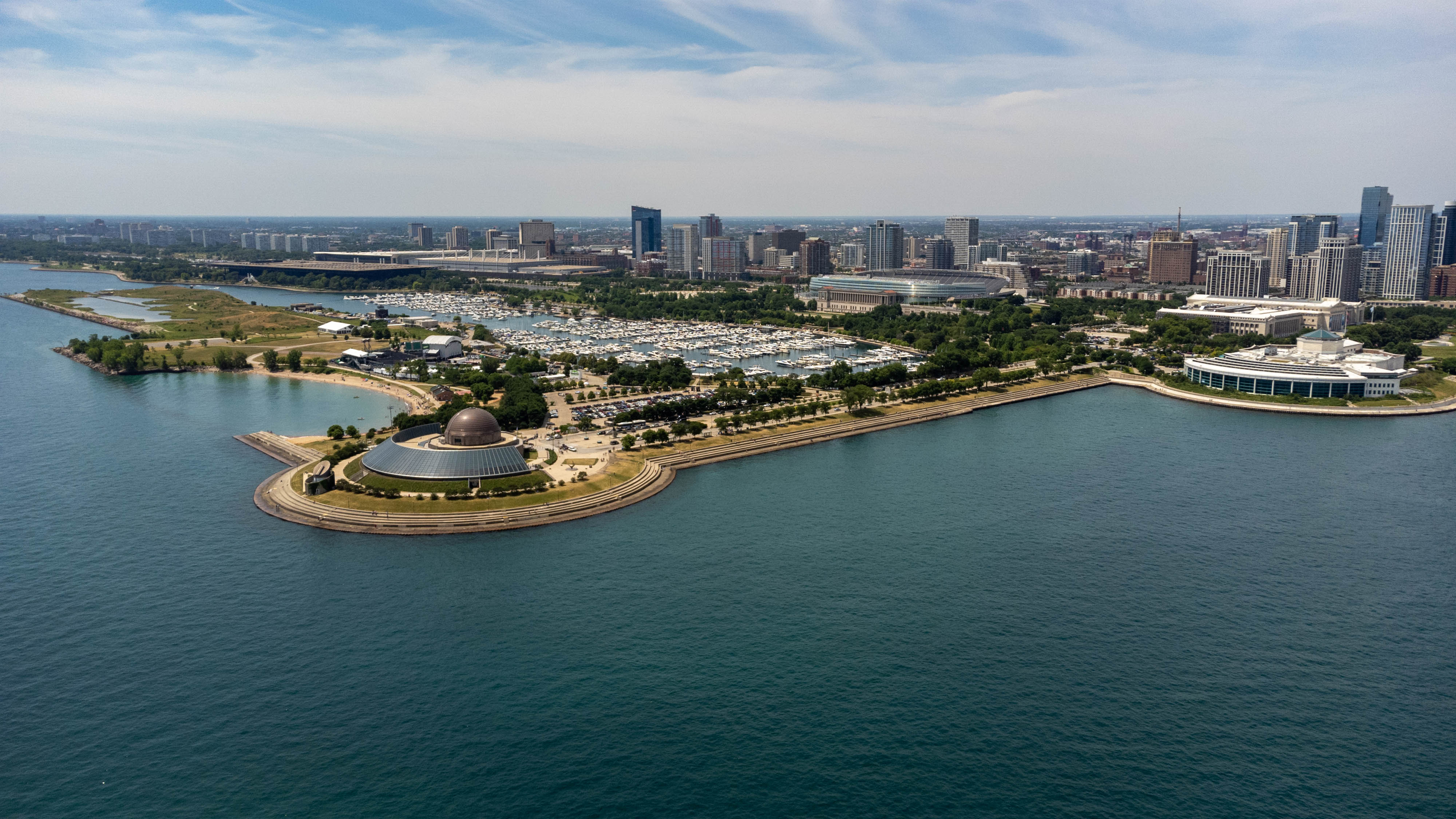
The Museum Campus comprises the southeast of Grant Park

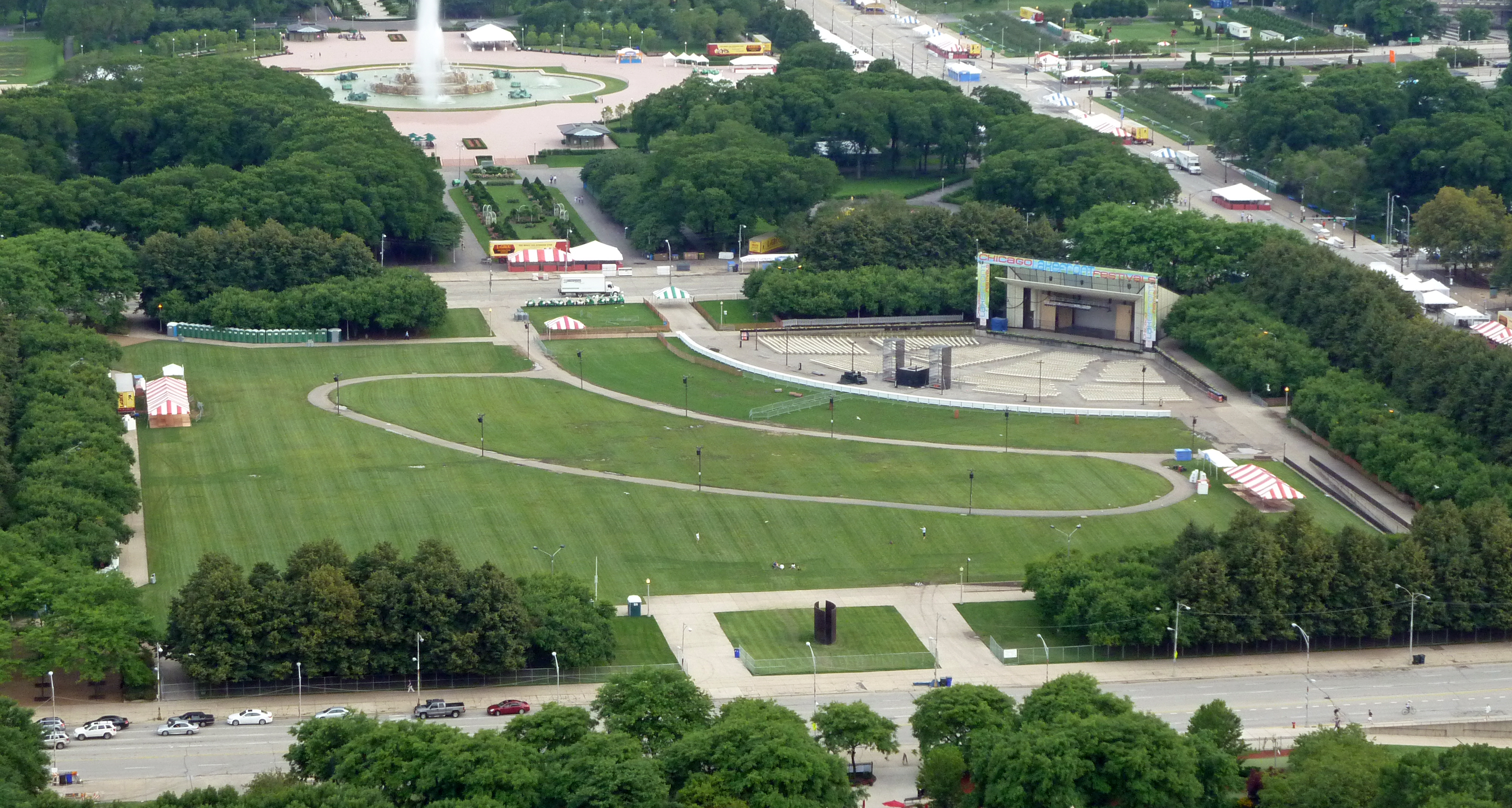
Petrillo Music Shell hosts several music festivals

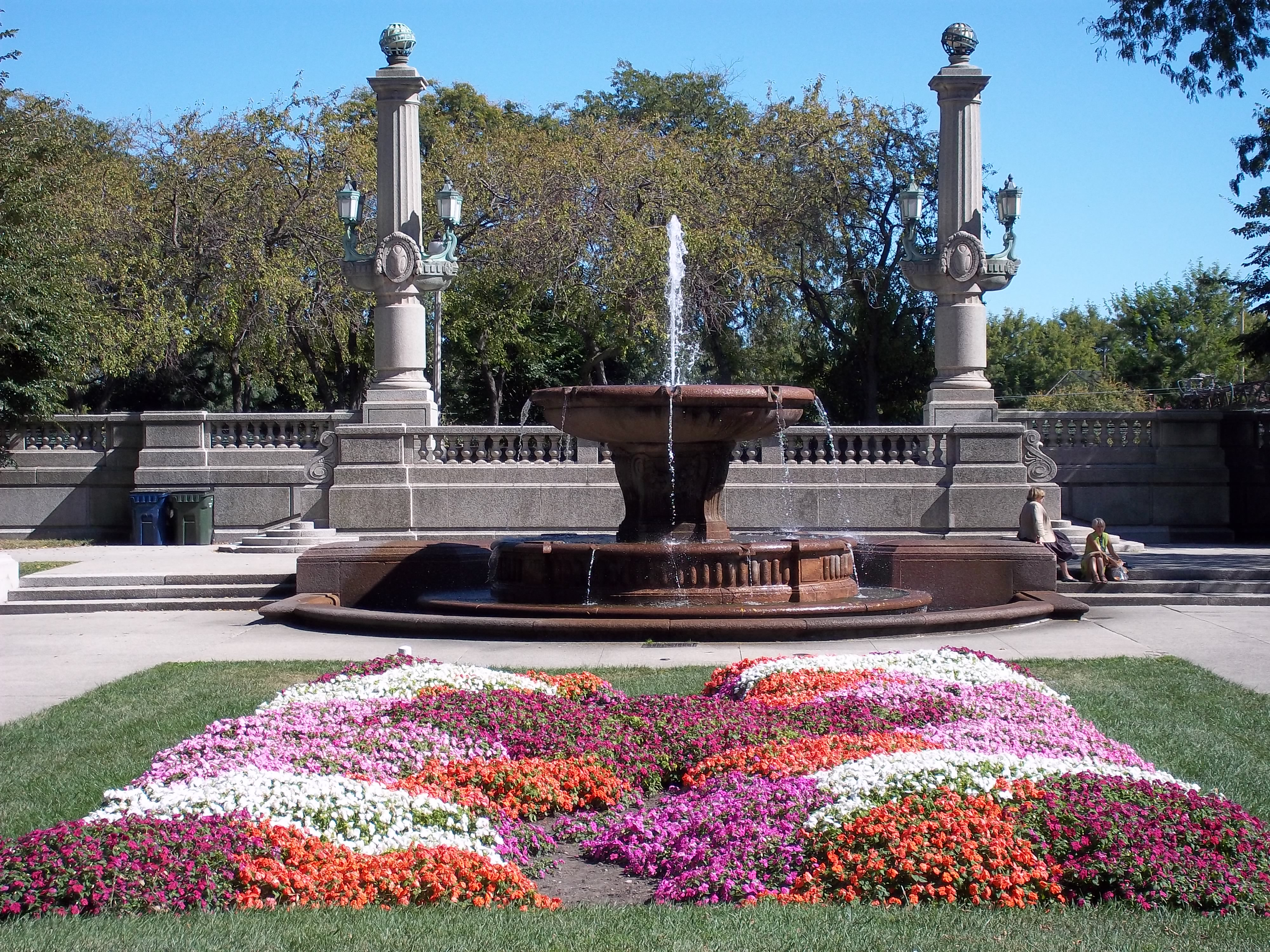
Beaux Arts garden on Michigan Avenue near 8th Street

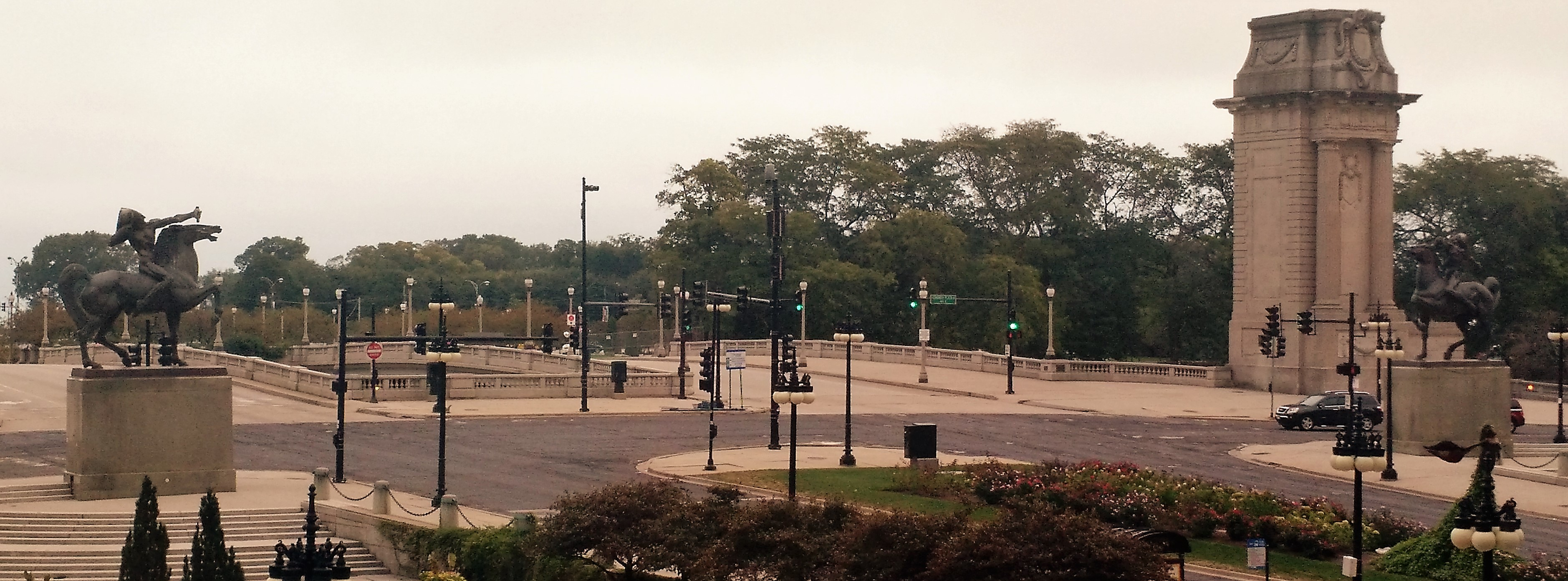
The Bowman and The Spearman flanking the western entrance at Ida B. Wells and Michigan

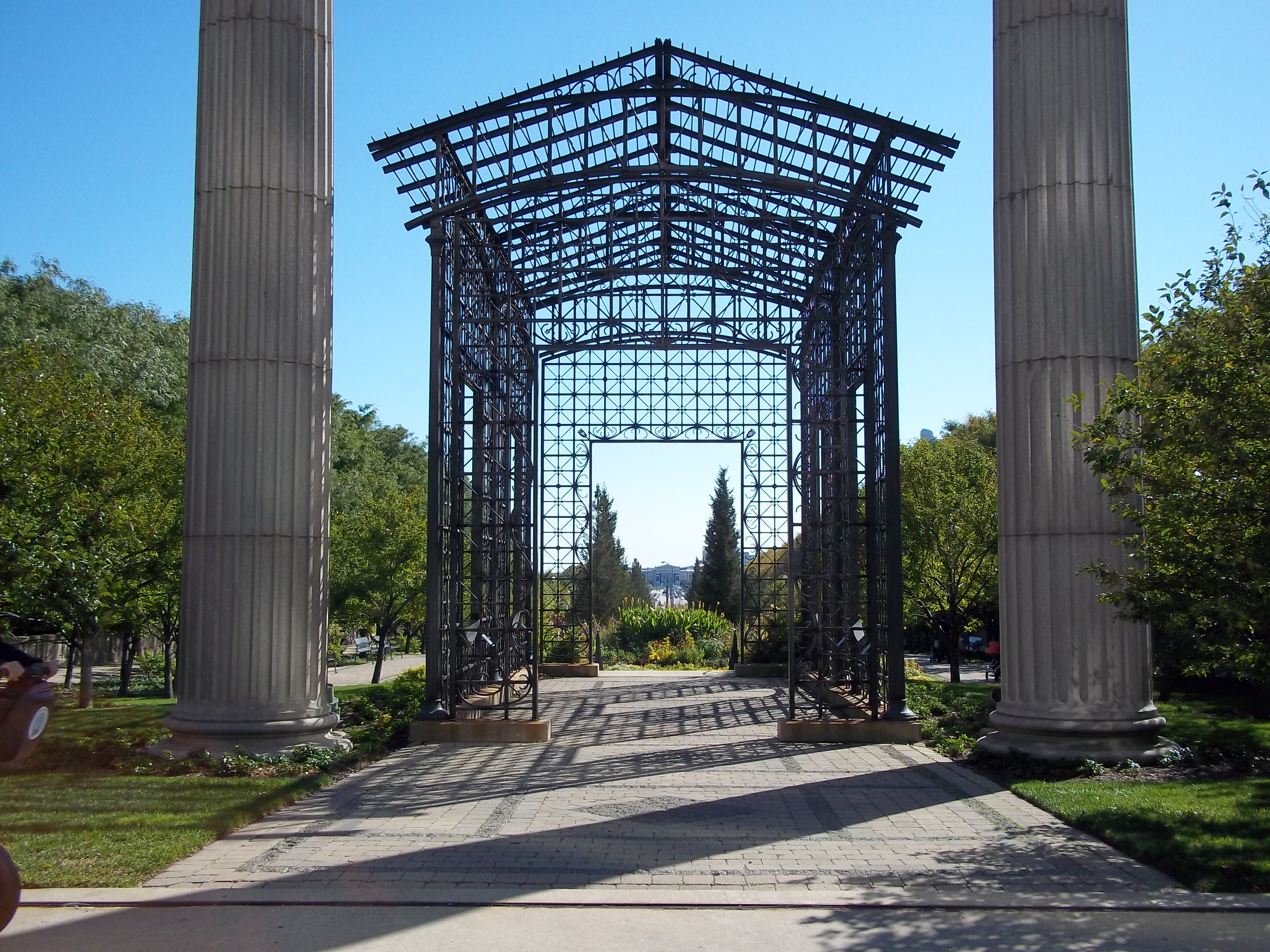
Bloch Cancer Survivors Garden in northeast Grant Park

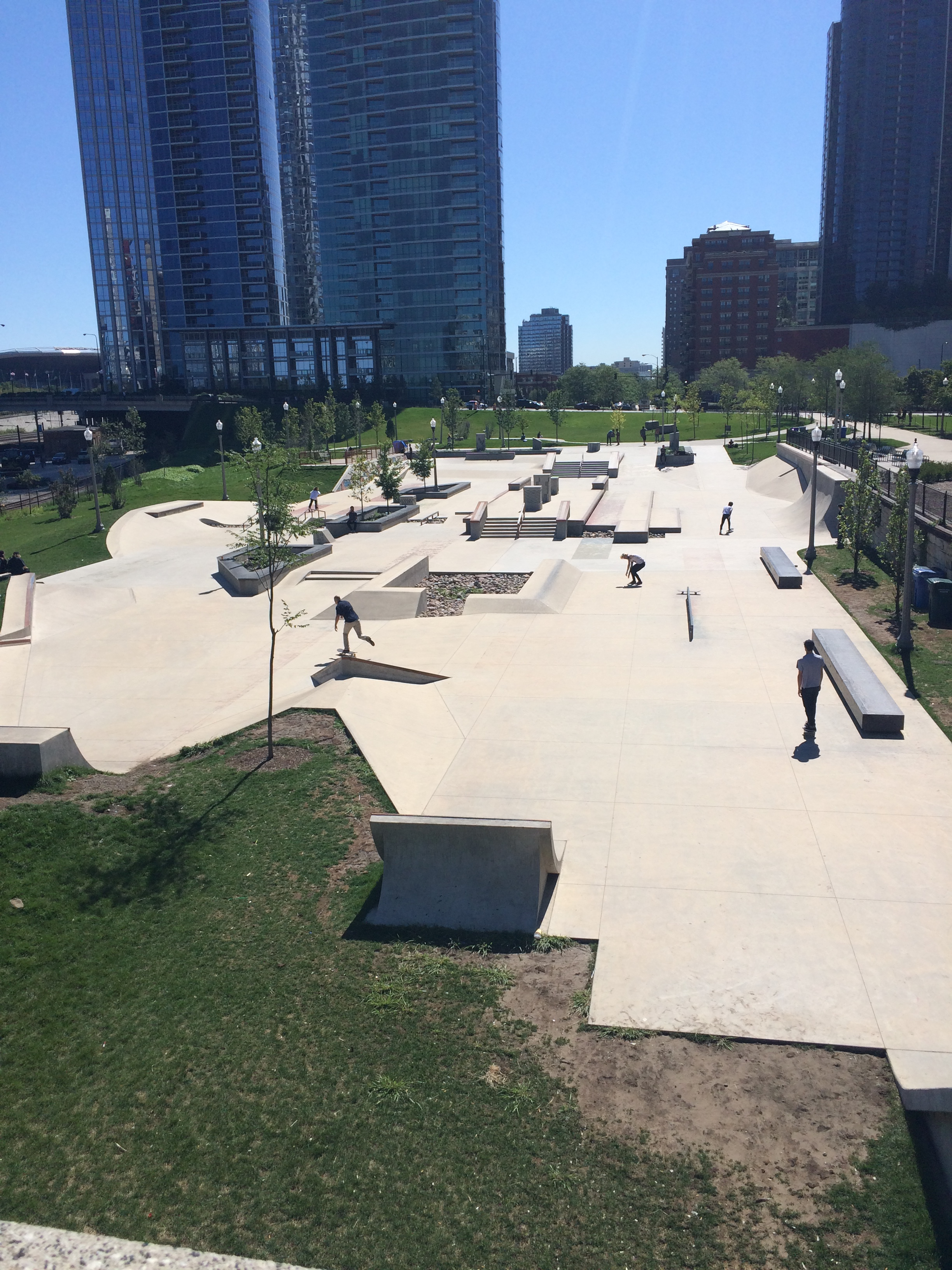
Skate Plaza

With 319 acres (1.29 km^{2}) between the downtown Chicago Loop and Lake Michigan, Grant Park offers many different attractions in its large open space. The park is generally flat. It is also crossed by large boulevards and even a bed of sunken railroad tracks. While bridges are used to span the tracks, and to connect with Millennium Park, the rest of the park must be reached by pedestrians at traffic crossings, except for a spacious underpass connection to the Museum Campus. There are also several parking garages under the park, along Michigan Avenue and east of Columbus Drive.

When the park was landscaped in the early 20th century in a formal beaux arts style, tall American elms were planted in allées and rectangular patterns. While hundreds of these trees still exist, reaching 60 ft (18 m) tall, they were devastated in the late 1970s by Dutch elm disease. Hybrid elms have since been used to replace those lost.

=== Millennium Park ===
The northwestern corner of the park was renovated from 1998 to 2004 to become Millennium Park, a contiguous area with a variety of artistic features by architects and artists. Millennium Park features the Jay Pritzker Pavilion, the Cloud Gate (aka The Bean), the Crown Fountain, the Lurie Garden, and other attractions. The park is connected by the BP Pedestrian Bridge and the Nichols Bridgeway to other portions of Grant Park.

=== Maggie Daley Park ===
Across the BP Pedestrian Bridge from Millennium Park, the northeast corner of Grant Park hosts outdoor and indoor activities at what is now Maggie Daley Park, previously called Daley Bicentennial Plaza. Designed by landscape architect Michael Van Valkenburgh, attractions here include summer and winter skating rinks, an extensive playground, climbing walls, tennis and pickleball courts, and an activities building, which were redeveloped from 2012 to 2015.

=== Art Institute of Chicago ===
Built in 1893 on the western edge of Grant Park, the Art Institute of Chicago is one of the premier art museums and art schools in the US, known especially for the extensive collection of Impressionist and American art, such as A Sunday Afternoon on the Island of La Grande Jatte, and Grant Wood's American Gothic. The School of the Art Institute of Chicago has facilities in the southeast corner of the museum's Grant Park complex.

=== Buckingham Fountain ===
The center piece of Grant Park is Buckingham Fountain, one of the world's largest fountains. In a rococo wedding cake style, the fountain was dedicated in 1927 as a gift to the city from Kate Sturges Buckingham in memory of her brother Clarence. The fountain operates from April to October with water displays every 20 minutes and a light and water display from 8:00 am to 11:00 pm.

=== Museum Campus ===
Chicago's Museum Campus is a 57-acre (23 ha) addition to Grant Park's southeastern end. The Museum Campus is the site of three of the city's most notable museums, all dedicated to the natural sciences: Adler Planetarium, Field Museum of Natural History, and Shedd Aquarium. A narrow isthmus along Solidarity Drive dominated by neoclassical sculptures of Kościuszko, Havliček and Nicolaus Copernicus connects to Northerly Island where the planetarium is located to the east of the Museum Campus situated on the mainland.

=== Petrillo Music Shell ===
Located at Jackson and Columbus Drives, the Petrillo Music Shell hosts music performances during the Chicago Jazz Festival, Chicago Blues Festival, Taste of Chicago, and Lollapalooza. The music shell's seating area includes an area called Butler Field, the block bounded by Lake Shore Drive, Columbus Drive, Monroe Drive, and Jackson Drive. The previous Petrillo Bandshell structure faced Hutchinson Field at the south end of the park, near 1100 South Columbus Drive.

=== Congress Plaza ===
Congress Plaza is a ceremonial entrance located on the park's western edge, at the Ida B. Wells Drive and Michigan Avenue intersection. Two semicircular plazas flanking Ida B. Wells Drive contain gardens, fountains, and artwork, including a pair of large bronze warrior statues, The Bowman and The Spearman that are positioned like gatekeepers to the park.

=== Gardens ===
There are several gardens and flower displays throughout the park. Millennium Park houses the Lurie Garden, known for its display of tall grass flowers, particularly lavender, and a decorative post-modern water stream. To the east, across the BP Pedestrian Bridge, Daley Park holds tall grass plantings. To the northeast in Daley Park, at 375 East Randolph Drive, is the Richard & Annette Bloch Cancer Survivors Garden, marked by two huge doric columns from the demolished Chicago Federal Building and a wrought-iron pergola. The garden contains numerous walkways lined with planters and is one of several similar spaces created nationwide by R. A. Bloch Cancer Foundation.

Flanking the original Art Institute of Chicago Building are gardens in the north and south McCormick Courtyards; in the south courtyard is the bronze sculpture Fountain of the Great Lakes. To the south of the art museum, along Michigan Avenue, are a succession of gardens. Two of these are not far from to Orchestra Hall and honor former conductors of the Chicago Symphony Orchestra (Sir Georg Solti and Theodore Thomas).

To the southeast of the Art Institute, near the Court of Presidents, are demonstration gardens that flank Ida B. Wells Drive and surrounding Buckingham Fountain are a series of formal gardens, including the Tiffany Celebration Garden to the south. Near the four corners of Buckingham Fountain are circular gardens with four statues of children created by sculptor Leonard Crunelle, entitled "Crane Girl", "Turtle Boy", "Dove Girl", and "Fisher Boy", with each child standing with the associated animal at its feet and surrounded by a small fountain.

=== The Court of the Presidents ===
The Court of the Presidents is located directly on the north and south side of E. Ida B. Wells Drive, west of S. Columbus Drive and east of S. Michigan Ave. Manicured gardens and art work help define the Court of Presidents. South President's Court, until recently, has primarily been gardens. However, within the past decade the city has decided to use the area to showcase art work by Chicagoans. While unique artwork has long been a tradition of Chicago's parks, South President's Court had the added benefit of showcasing "in house" art as its first newsworthy collection, entitled "Artist and Automobiles." The collection, organized by the Public Art Program and the Chicago Department of Cultural Affairs, consisted of sculptures composed entirely of parts found on old automobiles.

=== Hutchinson Field ===
Much of the southern end of Grant Park is given over to Hutchinson Field, an open space for large events, with a dozen baseball or softball diamonds named for financier and long-time Art Institute President, Charles L. Hutchinson.

=== Chicago Lakefront Trail ===
A section of the Chicago Lakefront Trail, an 18-mile multi-use path along the city's Lake Michigan shoreline, runs through the park's eastern edge. The trail runs adjacent to Lake Shore Drive from Randolph Drive to Balbo Drive, then along the very edge of the seawall around the Shedd Aquarium. An underpass carries the trail under Solidarity Drive into Burnham Park.

=== Marinas and harbors ===
Two Lake Michigan marinas are accessed from Grant Park. Monroe Harbor provides 1000 mooring cans (served by tender service) and facilities in the expansive harbor east of the park. It is home to both the Chicago Yacht Club and the Columbia Yacht Club. Queen's Landing, at the center of the harbor and park's shoreline, is named for a 1959 visit there by Queen Elizabeth II aboard the Royal Yacht Britannia, in conjunction with the opening of the St. Lawrence Seaway. Du Sable Harbor, created in 1999 north of Randolph Drive, offers 420 boat docks and a harbor store.

=== Skate Plaza ===
The Grant Park Skate Plaza, designed by Chicago Landscape Architects Altamanu, was opened on December 6, 2014. The Plaza was initiated by Grant Park Conservancy President, Robert O'Neill. The new park occupies 3 acres (12,000 m^{2}) and has replaced the former skate area near the tennis courts. The Conservancy sought planning support from local skateboarders and BMX bikers who formed the Grant Park Conservancy & Advisory Council Skate Committee. The Plaza is located in the southwest corner of the park near the former site of the 1893 Central Station and includes limestone pieces from the former railroad terminal. The plaza cost $2.65 Million to build. In 2014, the park hosted both the Mountain Dew Skate Tour for its first return to Chicago since 2010 and the Volcom Wild in the Parks Tour for its first appearance in Chicago.

=== Dog park ===
Grant Bark Park, located on the corner of Columbus Drive and 11th Street, is a place for dogs to get their exercise. It's an off-leash park of 18,000 sq ft (1,700 m^{2}). The park is made of asphalt and pea gravel. Members pay a monthly fee to attend the park that helps with the upkeep and maintains the cleanliness. A water fountain for both dogs and humans is provided. Membership fees and any donations go toward maintenance. The park hosts benefits and events related to dogs to raise money as well. Leashed dogs are permitted in most areas of the park, but not in Millennium Park.

=== Other facilities ===
The shaded walking paths in Grant Park cover several miles. A circuit of the park's walking paths is estimated to take 4 mi (6.4 km).

For other sporting activities, the park has 16 softball/baseball fields and 12 tennis courts, open to the general public.

== Public art ==
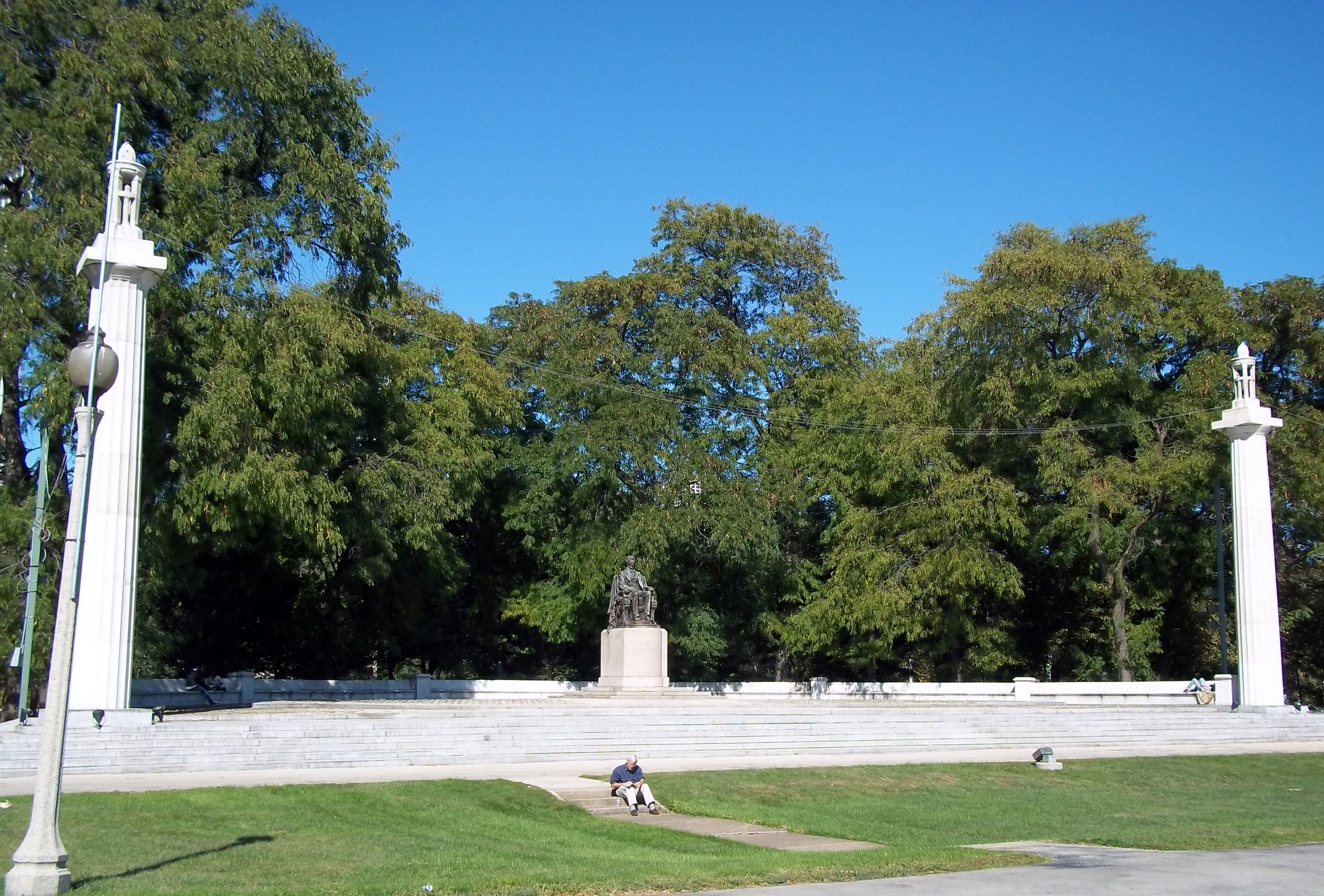
Lincoln Monument near Ida B. Wells Drive

The park holds a great deal of public art, much of it sculpture, in many areas including in Millennium Park, near Buckingham Fountain, the several gardens, and Congress Plaza. Four individual large installations, in other areas of the park, include:

=== Abraham Lincoln Monument ===
Abraham Lincoln: The Head of State is a statue by sculptor Augustus Saint-Gaudens set in a 150-foot wide exedra by architect Stanford White, honoring the Illinois resident and 16th President of the United States. The statue was cast in 1908 and was displayed at the Metropolitan Museum of Art and at the 1915 San Francisco World's Fair, prior to being installed in the park in 1926. It is located in the Court of Presidents, north of Ida B. Wells Drive and west of Columbus Drive and is frequently called Seated Lincoln to avoid confusion with Saint-Gaudens' 1887 sculpture Abraham Lincoln: The Man in Lincoln Park.

=== Agora ===
Agora (from Greek, for urban meeting place) is an installation of 106 headless, armless sculptures designed by the Polish artist Magdalena Abakanowicz in southwestern Grant Park near Roosevelt Road. The piece was brought to the park in 2006. The figures are 9 ft (2.7 m) tall and weigh approximately 1,800 lb (820 kg). Each is made from a hollow, seamless piece of weathering or COR-TEN® steel, giving the pieces a reddish appearance and rough bark-like texture. The figures appear to be milling about in a crowd; some face each other, while others look away.

=== Columbus Monument ===
A bronze statue by Carlo ("Charles", "Carl") Brioschi was displayed on a monumental pedestal at the southern end of Grant Park. In 1933, Chicago celebrated its 100th anniversary with the Century of Progress World's Fair. In conjunction with the fair, Chicago's Italian-American community raised funds and donated the statue of the Genoese navigator and explorer, Christopher Columbus. It was removed on July 24, 2020 by order of Mayor Lori Lightfoot amid the George Floyd protests in Chicago and the deployment of federal forces to Chicago over Lightfoot's objections.

=== Logan Monument ===
At Michigan Avenue and Ninth Street is the General John Logan Memorial, a large equestrian statue of John A. Logan, dedicated in 1897. Logan was a United States major general, who had resigned his congressional seat to serve in the U.S. Army during the Civil War. He led troops in many battles throughout the West and South. After the war, he was elected to the U.S. Senate from Illinois. The monument mound, with a statue by Augustus Saint-Gaudens and Alexander Phimister Proctor, was initially intended as a burial site for Logan, but his family declined to relocate the general's grave.

== Additions ==
=== Children's Museum ===
The Chicago Children's Museum announced plans in 2006 for a $100 million structure to replace its facilities at Navy Pier. The museum hoped to construct an underground building on the site of Daley Bicentennial Plaza, a plan that Mayor Richard M. Daley and council members approved in 2008. Some council members and area residents opposed the project and vowed to fight the proposal. After fundraising lagged, in January 2012, the Children's Museum announced that it no longer would seek a Grant Park location.

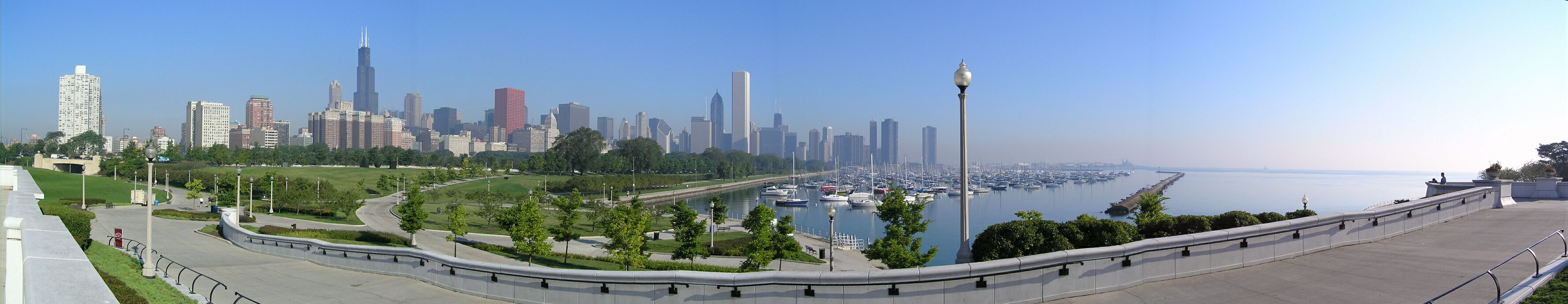
Grant Park, Monroe Harbor, and Chicago skyline 2004 from Museum Campus

== See also ==
- Millennium Park
- Parks in Chicago
