= Social information processing =

Social information processing is "an activity through which collective human actions organize knowledge." It is the creation and processing of information by a group of people. As an academic field Social Information Processing studies the information processing power of networked social systems.

Typically computer tools are used such as:

- Authoring tools: e.g., blogs
- Collaboration tools: e.g., wikis, in particular, e.g., Wikipedia
- Translating tools: Duolingo, reCAPTCHA
- Tagging systems (social bookmarking): e.g., del.icio.us, Flickr, CiteULike
- Social networking: e.g., Facebook, MySpace, Essembly
- Collaborative filtering: e.g., Digg, the Amazon Product Recommendation System, Yahoo! Answers, Urtak

Although computers are often used to facilitate networking and collaboration, they are not required. For example the Trictionary in 1982 was entirely paper and pen based, relying on neighborhood social networks and libraries. The creation of the Oxford English Dictionary in the 19th century was done largely with the help of anonymous volunteers organized by help wanted ads in newspapers and slips of paper sent through the postal mail.

== Current state of knowledge ==
The website for the AAAI 2008 Spring Symposium on Social Information Processing suggested the following topics and questions:

Tagging
Tagging has already attracted the interest of the AI community. While the initial purpose of tagging was to help users organize and manage their own documents, it has since been proposed that collective tagging of common documents can be used to organize information via an informal classification system dubbed a folksonomy. There is hope that folksonomies will eventually help fulfill the promise of the Semantic Web.

Human-based computation and collective intelligence
What type of problems are amenable to human swarm computing approaches? How can we design the "wisdom of crowds" effect to benefit our problem solving needs?

Incentives to participation
How to elicit quality metadata and content from users? How can users resistant to tagging be encouraged to tag content?

Social networks
While users create social networks for a variety of reasons – e.g., to track lives of friends or work or opinions of the users they respect – network information is important for a number of applications. Globally, an information ecosystem may arise through the interactions among users, and between users and content. A community of users interested in a specific topic may emerge over time, with linkages to other communities giving insight into relationships between topics.

Evolution of social media and information ecosystems
How does content, and its quality, change in time? There is increasing interest in peer-production systems, for example in how and why some open-source projects like Linux and Wikipedia are successful. Under what circumstances are user-generated content sites likely to succeed and what implications does this have for information-sharing and learning within communities?

Algorithms
Before we can harness the power of the social information processing, we need new approaches to structured data analysis, specifically algorithms for synthesizing various types of metadata: e.g., social networks and tagging. Research in this area will provide a principled foundation for the development of new algorithms for social search, information discovery and personalization and other approaches that exploit the power of the social information processing.

== Key concepts ==
=== Social Recommender Systems ===
Social overload corresponds to being imposed to high amount of information and interaction on social web. Social overload causes some challenges from the aspect of both social media websites and their users. Users need to deal with high volume of information and to make decisions among different social network applications whereas social network sites try to keep their existing users and make their sites interesting to users. To overcome social overload, social recommender systems has been utilized to engage users in social media websites in a way that users receive more personalized content using recommendation techniques. Social recommender systems are specific types of recommendation systems being designed for social media and utilizing new sort of data brought by it, such as likes, comments, tags and so on, to improve effectiveness of recommendations. Recommendation in social media have several aspects like recommendation of social media content, people, groups and tags.

==== Content ====
Social media lets users to provide feedback on the content produced by users of social media websites, by means of commenting on or liking the content shared by others and annotating their own-created content via tagging. This newly introduced metadata by social media helps to obtain recommendations for social media content with improved effectiveness. Also, social media lets to extract the explicit relationship between users such as friendship and people followed/followers. This provides further improvement on collaborative filtering systems because now users can have judgement on the recommendations provided based on the people they have relationships. There have been studies showing the effectiveness of recommendation systems which utilize relationships among users on social media compared to traditional collaborative filtering based systems, specifically for movie and book recommendation. Another improvement brought by social media to recommender systems is solving the cold start problem for new users.

Some key application areas of social media content recommendation are blog and blog post recommendation, multimedia content recommendation such as YouTube videos, question and answer recommendation to question askers and answerers on social question-and-answer websites, job recommendation (LinkedIn), news recommendation on social new aggregator sites (like Digg, GoogleReader, Reddit etc.), short message recommendations on microblogs (such as Twitter).

==== People ====
Also known as social matching (the term is proposed by Terveen and McDonald), people recommender systems deal with recommending people to people on social media. Aspects making people recommender systems distinct from traditional recommender systems and require special attention are basically privacy, trust among users, and reputation. There are several factors which effect the choice of recommendation techniques for people recommendation on social networking sites (SNS). Those factors are related to types of relationships among people on social networking sites, such as symmetric vs asymmetric, ad-hoc vs long-term, and confirmed vs nonconfirmed relationships.

The scope of people recommender systems can be categorized into three: recommending familiar people to connect with, recommending people to follow and recommending strangers. Recommending strangers is seen as valuable as recommending familiar people because of leading to chances such as exchanging ideas, obtaining new opportunities, and increasing one’s reputation.

==== Challenges ====
Handling with social streams is one of the challenges social recommender systems face with. Social stream can be described as the user activity data pooled on newsfeed on social media websites. Social stream data has unique characteristics such as rapid flow, variety of data (only text content vs heterogenous content), and requiring freshness. Those unique properties of stream data compared to traditional social media data impose challenges on social recommender systems. Another challenge in social recommendation is performing cross-domain recommendation, as in traditional recommender systems. The reason is that social media websites in different domains include different information about users, and merging information within different contexts may not lead to useful recommendations. For example, using favorite recipes of users in one social media site may not be a reliable source of information to effective job recommendations for them.

=== Social awareness ===
Participation of people in online communities, in general, differ from their participatory behavior in real-world collective contexts. Humans in daily life are used to making use of "social cues" for guiding their decisions and actions e.g. if a group of people is looking for a good restaurant to have lunch, it is likely that they will choose to enter to a local that have some customers inside instead of one that it is empty (the more crowded restaurant could reflect its popularity and in consequence, its quality of service). However, in online social environments, it is not straightforward how to access to these sources of information which are normally being logged in the systems, but this is not disclosed to the users.

There are some theories that explain how this social awareness can affect the behavior of people in real-life scenarios. The American philosopher George Herbert Mead states that humans are social creatures, in the sense that people's actions cannot be isolated from the behavior of the whole collective they are part of because every individuals' act are influenced by larger social practices that act as a general behavior's framework. In his performance framework, the Canadian sociologist Erving Goffman postulates that in everyday social interactions individuals perform their actions by collecting information from others first, in order to know in advance what they may expect from them and in this way being able to plan how to behave more effectively.

==== Benefits ====
In the same way that in the real-world, providing social cues in virtual communities can help people to understand better the situations they face in these environments, to alleviate their decision-making processes by enabling their access to more informed choices, to persuade them to participate in the activities that take place there, and to structure their own schedule of individual and group activities more efficiently.

In this frame of reference, an approach called "social context displays" has been proposed for showing social information -either from real or virtual environments- in digital scenarios. It is based on the use of graphical representations to visualize the presence and activity traces of a group of people, thus providing users with a third-party view of what is happening within the community i.e. who are actively participating, who are not contributing to the group efforts, etc. This social-context-revealing approach has been studied in different scenarios (e.g. IBM video-conference software, large community displaying social activity traces in a shared space called NOMATIC*VIZ), and it has been demonstrated that its application can provide users with several benefits, like providing them with more information to make better decisions and motivating them to take an active attitude towards the management of their self and group representations within the display through their actions in the real-life.

==== Concerns ====
By making the traces of activity of users publicly available for others to access it is natural that it can raise users concerns related to which are their rights over the data they generate, who are the final users that can have access to their information and how they can know and control their privacy policies. There are several perspectives that try to contextualize this privacy issue. One perspective is to see privacy as a tradeoff between the degree of invasion to the personal space and the number of benefits that the user could perceive from the social system by disclosing their online activity traces. Another perspective is examining the concession between the visibility of people within the social system and their level of privacy, which can be managed at an individual or at a group level by establishing specific permissions for allowing others to have access to their information. Other authors state that instead of enforcing users to set and control privacy settings, social systems might focus on raising their awareness about who their audiences are so they can manage their online behavior according to the reactions they expect from those different user groups.

== See also ==
- Computer-mediated communication
- Crowdsourcing
- Decision making
- Social computing
- Social information processing theory
- Social translucence
