= Chicago Christmas Tree =

Public Christmas tree in Chicago, Illinois, USA

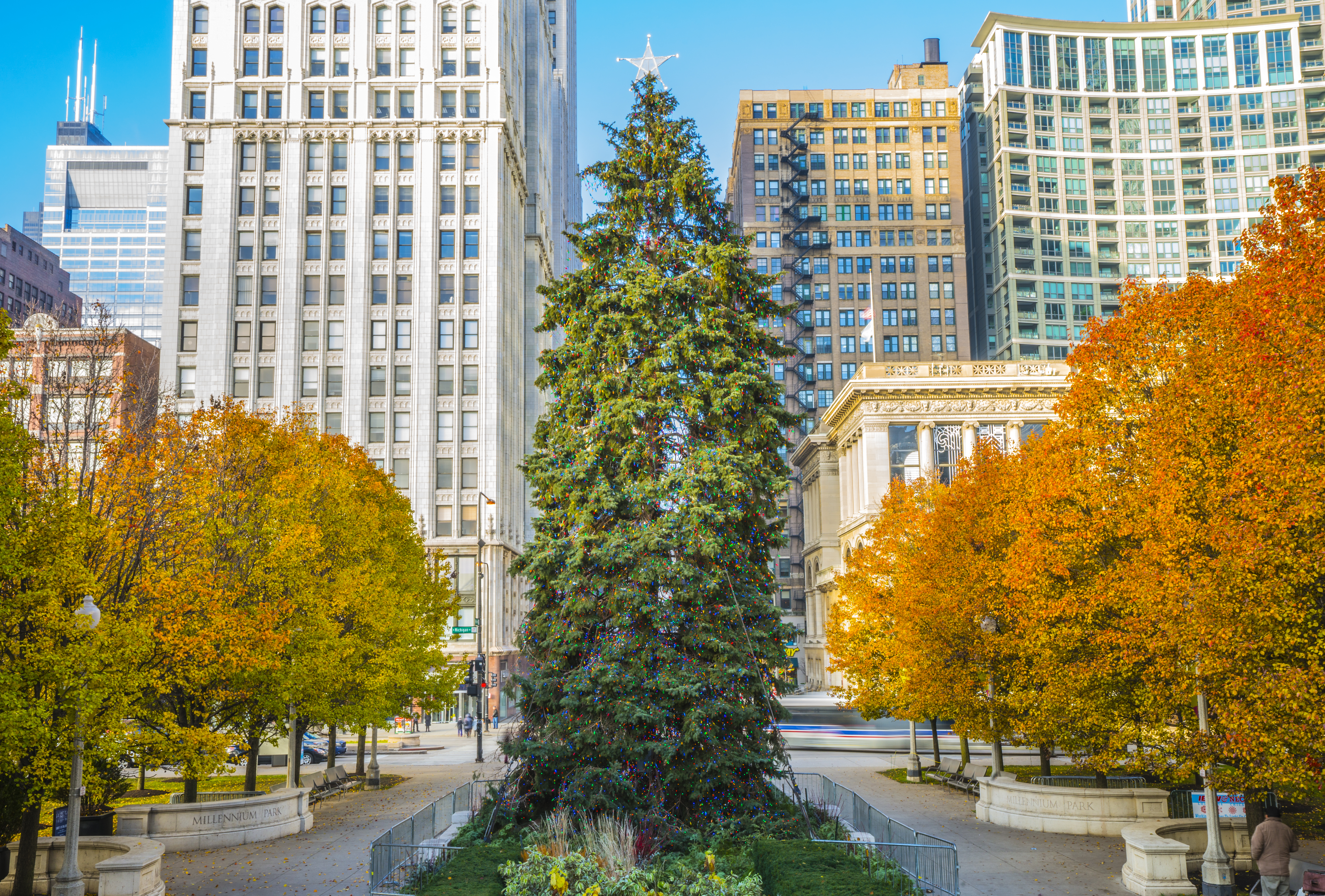
The 2015 Chicago Christmas Tree in Millennium Park.

The Chicago Christmas Tree is the city of Chicago's official Christmas tree. It is located in Millennium Park. Historically, the tree was located in Grant Park and Daley Plaza.

== History ==
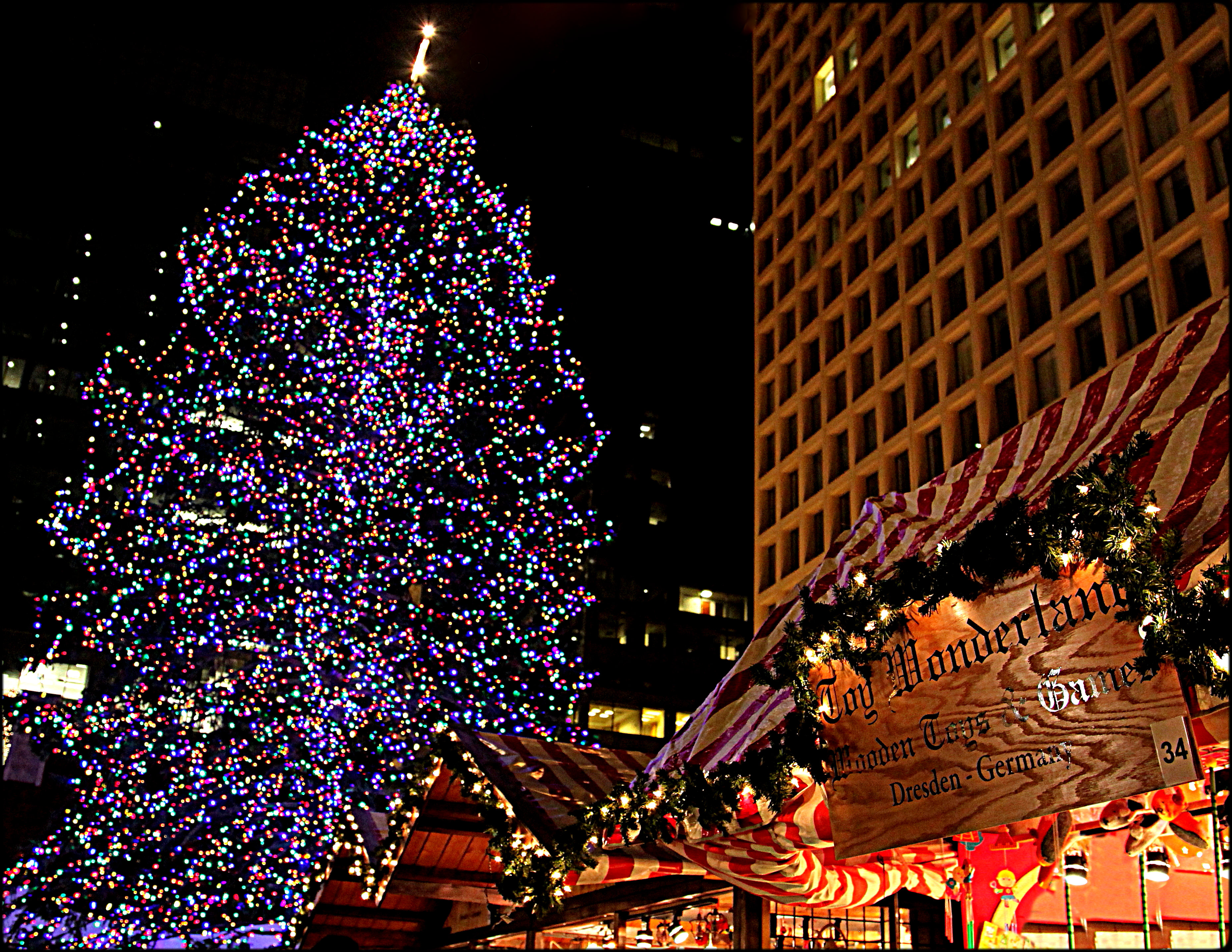
The Chicago Christmas Tree in December 2012.

The first official Christmas tree in the city of Chicago was installed in 1913 in Grant Park and lit on Christmas Eve by then-mayor Carter Harrison. This first tree was a 35-foot (11 m) tall spruce tree. In December 1956 the official tree, though still installed in Grant Park (at Michigan Avenue and Congress Parkway), was not an individual tree. The tree was a combination of many smaller trees, stood 70 feet (21 m) tall, and was decorated with over 4000 lights and 2000 ornaments. Beginning with Christmas 1966 the official Chicago Christmas tree was placed in Civic Center Plaza, now known as Daley Plaza. With the exception of 1982, the tree was installed in Daley Plaza each year until 2015.

The city continued to use multiple trees to constitute the official Chicago Christmas Tree through Christmas 2008, that year the tree was constructed from 113 individual trees and stood 85 feet (26 m). Following a report from CBS 2 in Chicago which revealed the erection of the frame and construction of the tree cost the city $300,000, the city decided to do away with the multiple trees and erect an individual tree in Daley Plaza. This was billed as a way to save the city money during the economic recession.

The 2009 Daley Plaza Christmas tree was an individual tree donated by a family in Palos Heights, Illinois. The 2009 tree cost was reduced by more than half of the $300,000 the 2008 tree cost to erect, decorate and maintain. Because the 2009 tree was just one tree, as opposed to multiple smaller trees, it could not support the weight of the many ornaments that usually adorn the Daley Plaza tree and thus it was decorated only with lights.

In 2010, for the first time, the Daley Plaza Christmas tree was chosen through a contest. The contest began in July 2010 but the deadline was extended after none of the original submissions met the height requirement. The contest winner was decided based on the results of an online poll. Chosen from three finalists, the winning tree, donated by a McHenry, Illinois family, received 2,678 votes out of 5,182.

For 2015, the Chicago Christmas Tree was moved to a new location in Millennium Park.

== Description ==
The official Chicago Christmas tree has varied in height from the 35-foot (11 m) spruce used in 1913 to the 85-foot (26 m) tree used in 2008. The contest rules in 2010 laid out a number of prerequisites that were required of the winning tree. The winning tree had to be at least 55 feet (17 m) tall, the tree chosen measured 70 feet (21 m), and had to be a spruce or fir tree as pine trees were deemed not sturdy enough. In addition the tree had to be found within 100 miles (160 km) of the Chicago Loop and in a location that it could safely be removed from. The tree used in 2010 was decorated with 7000 LED lights and the tree topper was a lighted star. The 70-foot (21 m) fir used in 2010 weighed in at 11,900 pounds (5,400 kg).

== See also ==
- Christkindlmarket, Chicago
- List of individual trees
