= Trictionary =

Trilingual Dictionary

Trictionary is a 400-page trilingual illustrated dictionary for translating English, Chinese, and Spanish, published in 1982, covering about 3,000 words in each language. The wordbook was compiled by anonymous volunteers, mostly younger students from New York City whose native language was English, Chinese, or Spanish. The compilation was made "by the spare-time energy of some 150 young people from the neighborhood" aged between 10 and 15, two afternoons a week over three years. The project was sponsored by the National Endowment for the Humanities and work was done at the Chatham Square branch of the New York Public Library. The original idea was developed by Jane Shapiro, a teacher of English as a Second Language at Junior High School 65, helped by Mary Scherbatoskoy of ARTS (Art Resources for Teachers and Students).

Tom McArthur described the project as a future model for reference work creation based on group collaboration, volunteer work, and no single or named author; the Trictionary was "something much more radically interesting: turning students on occasion into once-in-a-lifetime Samuel Johnsons and Noah Websters." McArthur's 1986 observation was prescient; the project is now seen as an early model of social information processing.
