= Open-access poll =

Opinion poll with self-selected participants

An open-access poll is a type of opinion poll in which a nonprobability sample of participants self-select into participation. The term includes call-in, mail-in, and some online polls.

The most common examples of open-access polls ask people to phone a number, click a voting option on a website, or return a coupon cut from a newspaper. By contrast, professional polling companies use a variety of techniques to attempt to ensure that the polls they conduct are representative, reliable and scientific. The most glaring difference between an open-access poll and a scientific poll is that scientific polls typically randomly select their samples and sometimes use statistical weights to make them representative of the target population.

== Advantages and disadvantages ==
Since participants in an open-access poll are volunteers rather than a random sample, such polls represent the most interested individuals, just as in voting. In the case of political polls, such participants might be more likely voters.

Because no sampling frame is used to draw the sample of participants, open-access polls may not have participants that represent the larger population. Indeed, they may be composed simply of individuals who happen to hear about the poll. As a consequence, the results of the poll cannot be generalized, but are only representative of the participants of the poll.

One example of an error produced by an open access-poll was one taken by The Literary Digest to predict the 1936 United States presidential election. Similar polls by the magazine had correctly predicted the outcome of the four earlier presidential elections. The magazine's 1936 poll suggested that Alfred Landon would defeat Franklin D. Roosevelt by an overwhelming margin. In fact, the opposite happened. Later studies suggested that the main reason for the error was that Roosevelt's opponents were more vocal and thus more willing to respond to the magazine, compared to the silent majority who supported Roosevelt. By contrast, scientific opinion polls taken by George Gallup correctly showed a clear lead for Roosevelt, albeit still noticeably lower than what he achieved.

A way to minimize that bias is to weigh the results in order to make them more representative of the overall population. This does not make the results of the poll completely representative of the population but it does help increase the chances of the results representing the overall population.

== Online poll ==
An online poll is a survey in which participants communicate responses via the Internet, typically by completing a questionnaire in a web page. Online polls may allow anyone to participate, or they may be restricted to a sample drawn from a larger panel. The use of online panels has become increasingly popular and is now the single biggest research method in Australia.

Proponents of scientific online polling state that in practice their results are no less reliable than traditional polls, and that the problems faced by traditional polling, such as inadequate data for quota design and poor response rates for phone polls, can also lead to systemic bias. Some others express the hope that careful choice of a panel of possible respondents may allow online polling to become a useful tool of analysis, but feel that this is rarely the case.

== Voodoo poll ==
A voodoo poll (or pseudo-poll) is a pejorative description of an opinion poll with no statistical or scientific reliability, which is therefore not a good indicator of opinion on an issue. A voodoo poll will tend to involve self-selection, will be unrepresentative of the target population, and is often very easy to rig by those with a partisan interest in the results of the poll.

The term was coined by Sir Robert Worcester, founder of legitimate polling company MORI, which he chaired for 36 years to June 2005, with special reference to "phone-in" polls. He used the term in British newspaper The Independent on July 23, 1995 to show how easy it was to rig a phone-in poll by voting nine times. The term is still used to refer to unscientific, unrepresentative and unreliable polls.

== See also ==
- Push poll
- Biased sample
- Social polling
- Voxpop
- Urtak
