= Millennium Park =

Public park in Chicago, Illinois, US

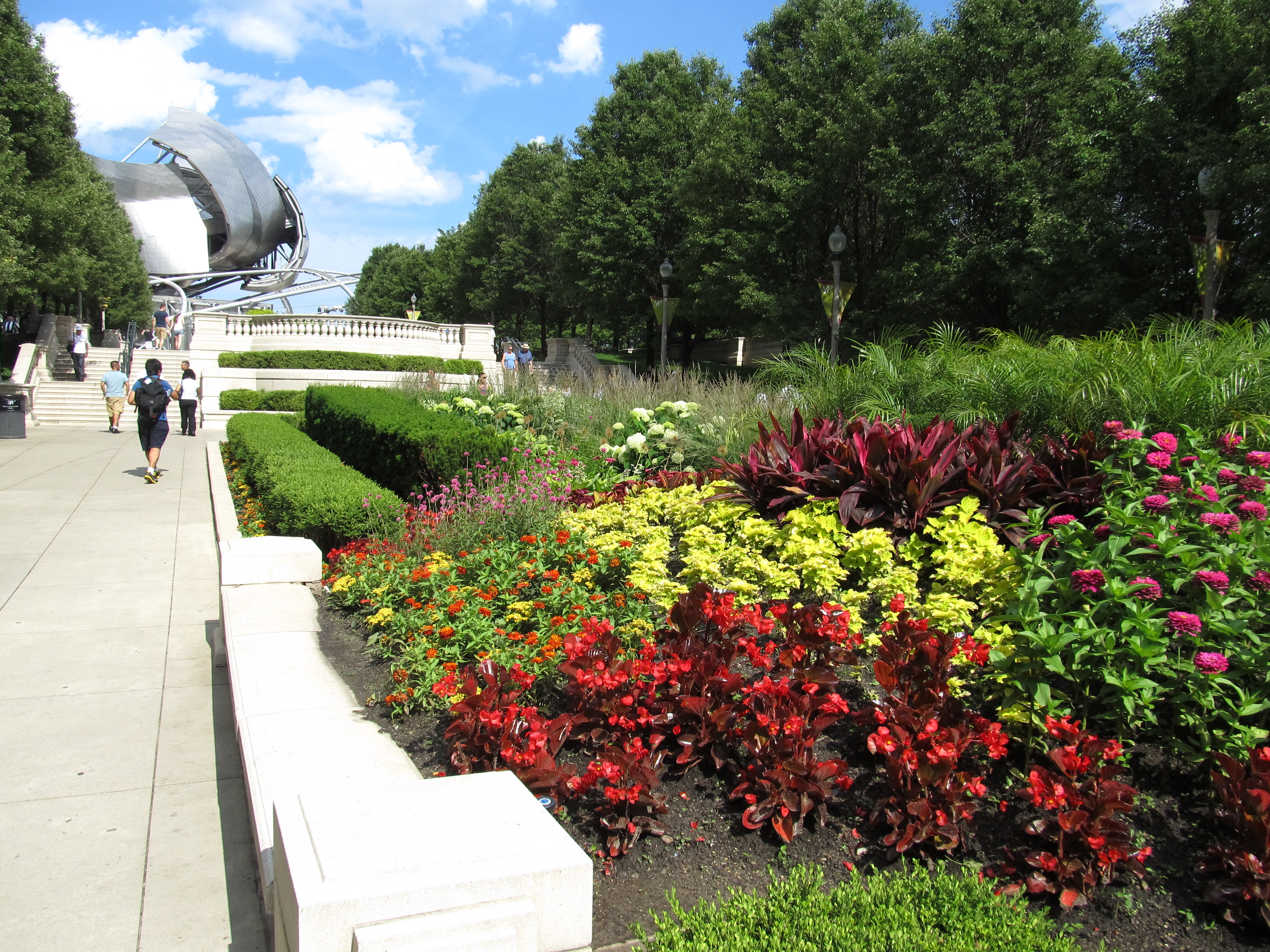
- Millennium Park

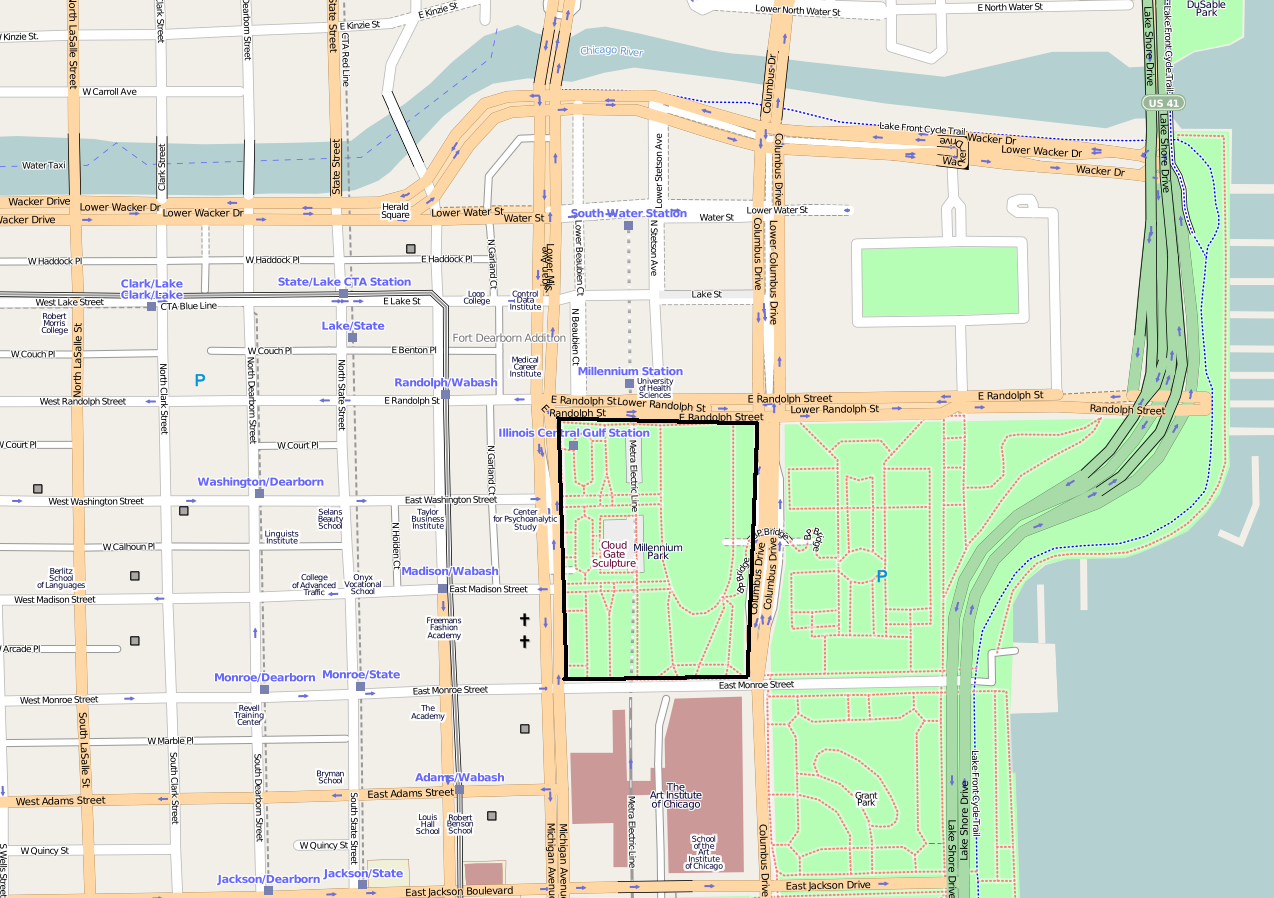
- Map of Millennium Park
- Type: Urban park
- Location: Grant Park, Chicago, Illinois, US
- Coordinates: 41°52′57″N 87°37′21″W
- Area: 24.5 acres (9.9 ha)
- Elevation: 574 ft (175 m)
- Opened: July 16, 2004; 22 years ago
- Operator: Chicago Department of Cultural Affairs
- Visitors: 25 million (in 2017)
- Status: Open all year (daily 6 a.m. to 11 p.m.)
- Parking: 2218 spaces
- Public transit: Brown Orange Pink Purple Green at Washington/Wabash; ME and at Millennium Station
- Website: Official website

Millennium Park is a public park in the Loop community area of Chicago, Illinois, United States, operated by the Chicago Department of Cultural Affairs and Special Events (DCASE). The park, opened in July 2004, is a prominent civic center near the city's Lake Michigan shoreline that covers a 24.5-acre (9.9 ha) section of northwestern Grant Park. Featuring a variety of public art, outdoor spaces and venues, the park is bounded by Michigan Avenue, Randolph Street, Columbus Drive and East Monroe Drive. In 2017, Millennium Park was the top tourist destination in Chicago and in the Midwest, and placed among the top ten in the United States with 25 million annual visitors.

Planning of the park, situated in an area occupied by parkland, the Illinois Central rail yards, and parking lots, began in October 1997. Construction began in October 1998, and Millennium Park opened in a ceremony on July 16, 2004, four years behind schedule. The three-day opening celebrations were attended by some 300,000 people and included an inaugural concert by the Grant Park Orchestra and Chorus. The park has received awards for its accessibility and green design. Millennium Park has free admission, and features the Jay Pritzker Pavilion, Cloud Gate, the Crown Fountain, the Lurie Garden, and various other attractions. The park is connected by the BP Pedestrian Bridge and the Nichols Bridgeway to other parts of Grant Park. Because the park sits atop parking garages, the Metra commuter rail Millennium Station and rail lines, it is considered the world's largest rooftop garden. In 2015, the park became the location of the city's annual Christmas tree lighting.

Some observers consider Millennium Park the city's most important project since the World's Columbian Exposition of 1893. It far exceeded its originally proposed budget of $150 million. The final cost of $475 million was borne by Chicago taxpayers and private donors. The city paid $270 million; private donors paid the rest, and assumed roughly half of the financial responsibility for the cost overruns. The construction delays and cost overruns were attributed to poor planning, many design changes, and cronyism. Nonetheless, architectural and urban planning critics have praised the completed park.

== Background ==
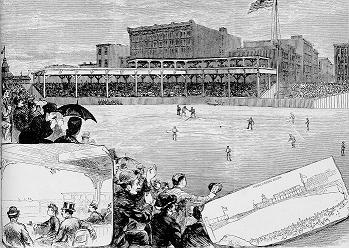
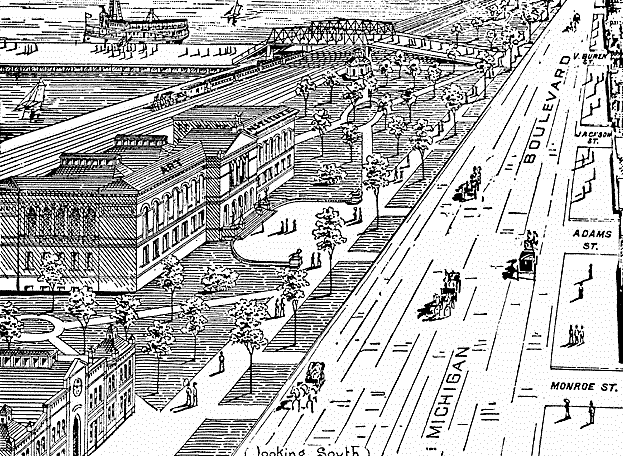
(Left) Union Base-Ball Grounds (also known as Lake Front Park) in 1883; (Right) Sketch of the Art Institute of Chicago in 1893, showing a structure on the Millennium Park site (lower left corner), railroad tracks, a municipal pier, and Lake Michigan covering most of Grant Park (reclaimed land formed the park beyond the track over the following decade).

From 1852 until 1997, the Illinois Central Railroad owned a right of way between downtown Chicago and Lake Michigan, in the area that became Grant Park and used it for railroad tracks. In 1871, Union Base-Ball Grounds was built on part of the site that became Millennium Park; the Chicago White Stockings played home games there until the grounds were destroyed in the Great Chicago Fire. Lake Front Park, the White Stockings' new ball grounds, was built in 1878 with a short right field due to the railroad tracks. The grounds were improved and the seating capacity was doubled in 1883, but the team had to move after the season ended the next year, as the federal government had given the city the land "with the stipulation that no commercial venture could use it". Daniel Burnham planned Grant Park around the Illinois Central Railroad property in his 1909 Plan of Chicago. Between 1917 and 1953, a prominent semicircle of paired Greek Doric-style columns (called a peristyle) was placed in this area of Grant Park (partially recreated in the new Millennium Park). In 1997, when the city gained airspace rights over the tracks, it decided to build a parking facility over them in the northwestern corner of Grant Park. Eventually, the city realized that a grand civic amenity might lure private dollars in a way that a municipal improvement such as ordinary parking structure would not, and thus began the effort to create Millennium Park. The park was originally planned under the name Lakefront Millennium Park.

The park was conceived as a 16-acre (6.5 ha) landscape-covered bridge over an underground parking structure to be built on top of the Metra/Illinois Central Railroad tracks in Grant Park. The park's overall design was by Skidmore, Owings & Merrill, and gradually additional architects and artists such as Frank Gehry and Thomas Beeby were incorporated into the plan. Sponsors were sought by invitation only.

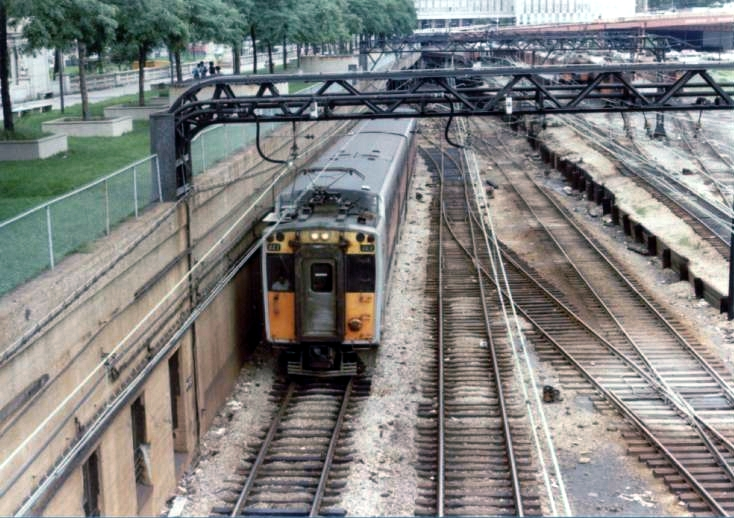
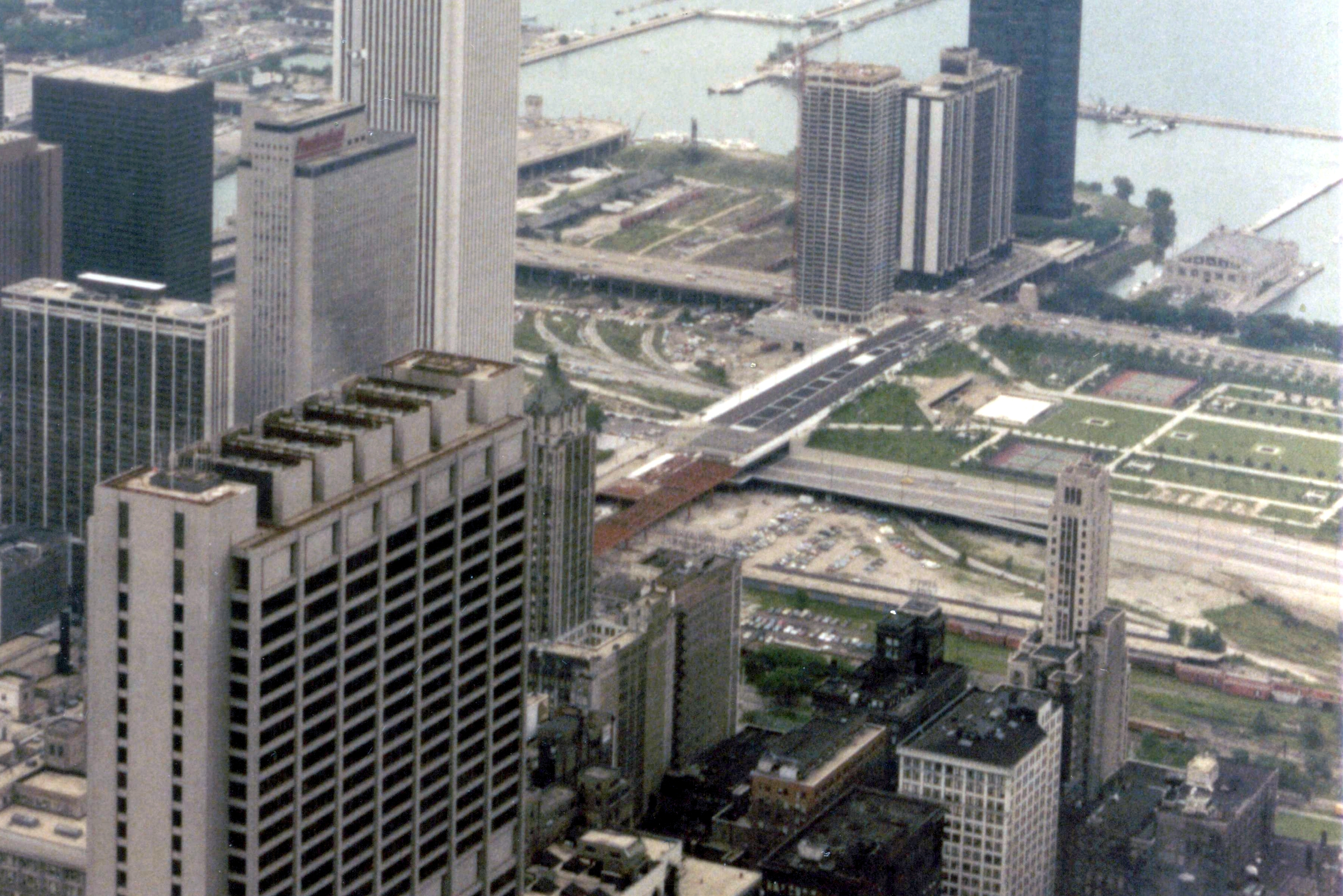
Views of what became Millennium Park in 1981: (Left) Train on tracks, now under what became Chase Promenade South; (Right) View from the Sears Tower of rail yards and parking lots, with Richard J. Daley Bicentennial Plaza beyond

In February 1999, the city announced it was negotiating with Frank Gehry to design a proscenium arch and orchestra enclosure for a bandshell, as well as a pedestrian bridge crossing Columbus Drive, and that it was seeking donors to cover his work. At the time, the Chicago Tribune dubbed Gehry "the hottest architect in the universe" in reference to the acclaim for his Guggenheim Museum Bilbao, and they noted the designs would not include Mayor Richard M. Daley's trademarks, such as wrought iron and seasonal flower boxes. Millennium Park project manager Edward Uhlir said "Frank is just the cutting edge of the next century of architecture," and noted that no other architect was being sought. Gehry was approached several times by Skidmore architect Adrian Smith on behalf of the city. His hesitance and refusal to accept the commission was overcome by Cindy Pritzker, the philanthropist, who had developed a relationship with the architect when he won the Pritzker Prize in 1989. According to John H. Bryan, who led fund-raising for the park, Pritzker enticed Gehry in face-to-face discussions, using a $15 million funding commitment toward the bandshell's creation. Having Gehry get involved helped the city realize its vision of having modern themes in the park; upon rumors of his involvement the Chicago Sun-Times proclaimed "Perhaps the future has arrived", while the Chicago Tribune noted that "The most celebrated architect in the world may soon have a chance to bring Chicago into the 21st Century".

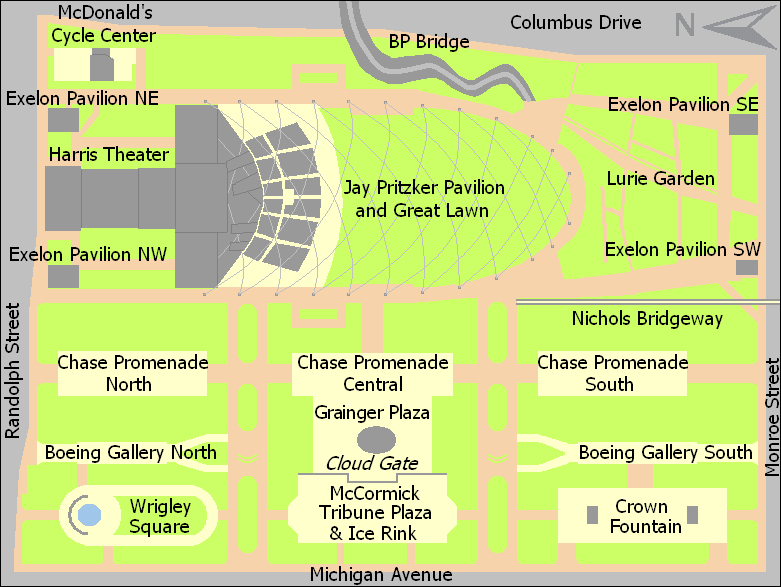
Image map of Millennium Park; east is at the top. Each feature or label is linked.

Plans for the park were officially announced in March 1998 and construction began in September of that year. Initial construction was under the auspices of the Chicago Department of Transportation, because the project bridges the railroad tracks. However, as the project grew and expanded, its broad variety of features and amenities outside the scope of the field of transportation placed it under the jurisdiction of the city's Public Buildings Commission.

In April 1999, the city announced that the Pritzker family had donated $15 million to fund Gehry's bandshell and an additional nine donors committed $10 million. The day of this announcement, Gehry agreed to the design request. In November, when his design was unveiled, Gehry said the bridge design was preliminary and not well-conceived because funding for it was not committed. The need to fund a bridge to span the eight-lane Columbus Drive was evident, but some planning for the park was delayed in anticipation of details on the redesign of Soldier Field. In January 2000, the city announced plans to expand the park to include features that became Cloud Gate, the Crown Fountain, the McDonald's Cycle Center, and the BP Pedestrian Bridge. Later that month, Gehry unveiled his new winding design for the bridge.

Mayor Daley's influence was key in getting corporate and individual sponsors to pay for much of the park. Bryan, the former chief executive officer (CEO) of Sara Lee Corporation who spearheaded the fundraising, says that sponsorship was by invitation and no one refused the opportunity to be a sponsor. One Time magazine writer describes the park as the crowning achievement for Mayor Daley, while another suggests the park's cost and time overages were examples of the city's mismanagement. The July 16–18, 2004, opening ceremony was sponsored by J.P. Morgan Chase & Co.

The community around Millennium Park has become one of the most fashionable and desired residential addresses in Chicago. In 2006, Forbes named the park's 60602 zip code as the hottest in terms of price appreciation in the country, with upscale buildings such as The Heritage at Millennium Park (130 N. Garland) leading the way for other buildings, such as Waterview Tower, The Legacy and Joffrey Tower. The median sale price for residential real estate was $710,000 in 2005 according to Forbes, also ranking it on the list of most expensive zip codes. The park has been credited with increasing residential real estate values by $100 per square foot ($1,076 per m^{2}).

== Features ==
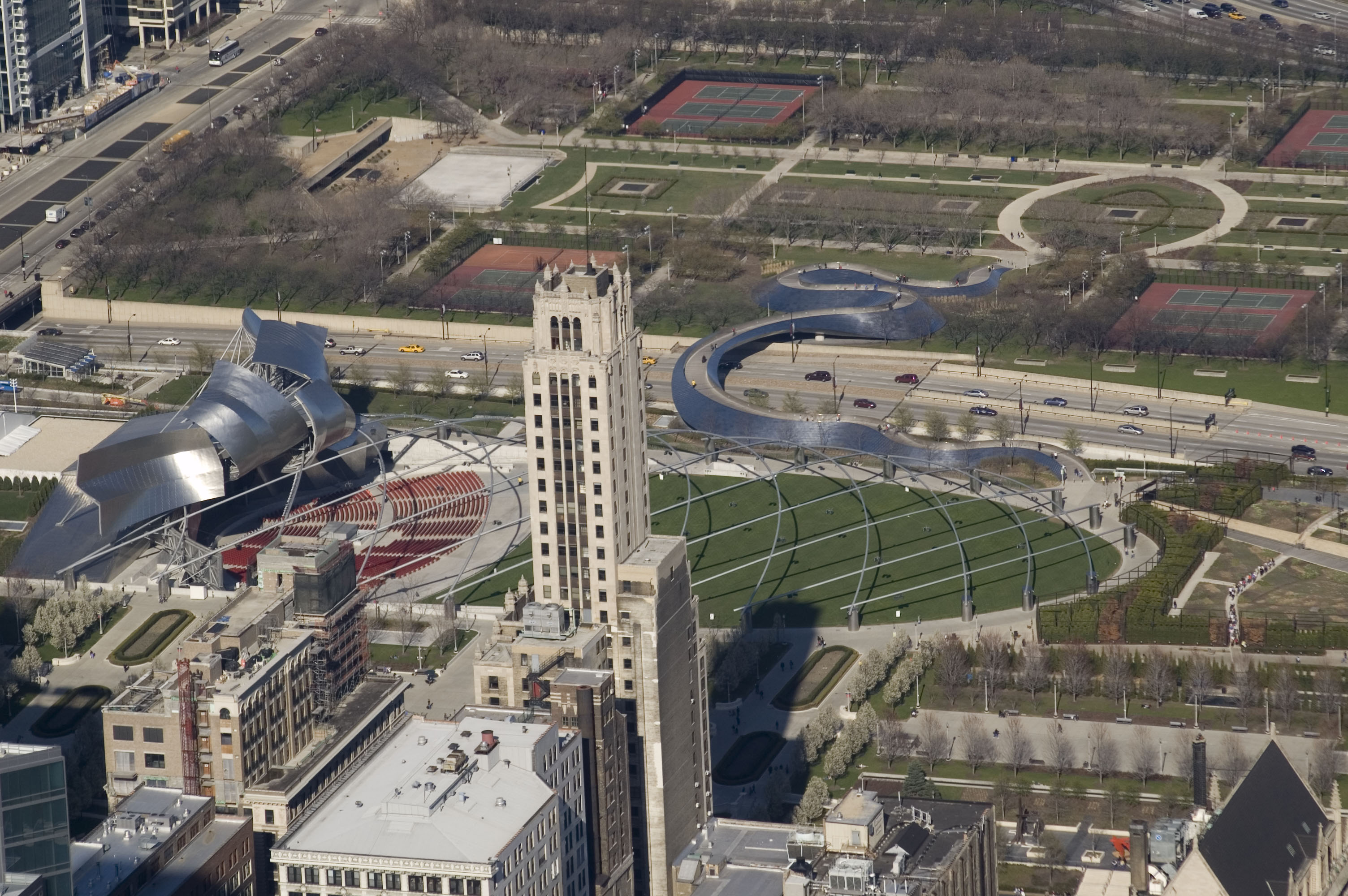
Pritzker Pavilion and BP Bridge in Millennium Park, with Daley Bicentennial Plaza behind, seen from Willis Tower in 2007

Millennium Park is a portion of the 319-acre (129.1 ha) Grant Park, known as the "front lawn" of downtown Chicago, and has four major artistic highlights: the Jay Pritzker Pavilion, Cloud Gate, the Crown Fountain, and the Lurie Garden. Millennium Park is successful as a public art venue in part due to the grand scale of each piece and the open spaces for display. A showcase for postmodern architecture, it also features the McCormick Tribune Ice Skating Rink, the BP Pedestrian Bridge, the Joan W. and Irving B. Harris Theater for Music and Dance, Wrigley Square, the McDonald's Cycle Center, the Exelon Pavilions, the AT&T Plaza, the Boeing Galleries, the Chase Promenade, and the Nichols Bridgeway.

Millennium Park is considered one of the largest green roofs in the world, having been constructed on top of a railroad yard and large parking garages. The park, which is known for being user friendly, has a very rigorous cleaning schedule with many areas being swept, wiped down or cleaned multiple times a day. Although the park was unveiled in July 2004, some features opened earlier, and upgrades continued for some time afterwards. Along with the cultural features above ground (described below) the park has its own 2218-space parking garage.

=== Jay Pritzker Pavilion ===
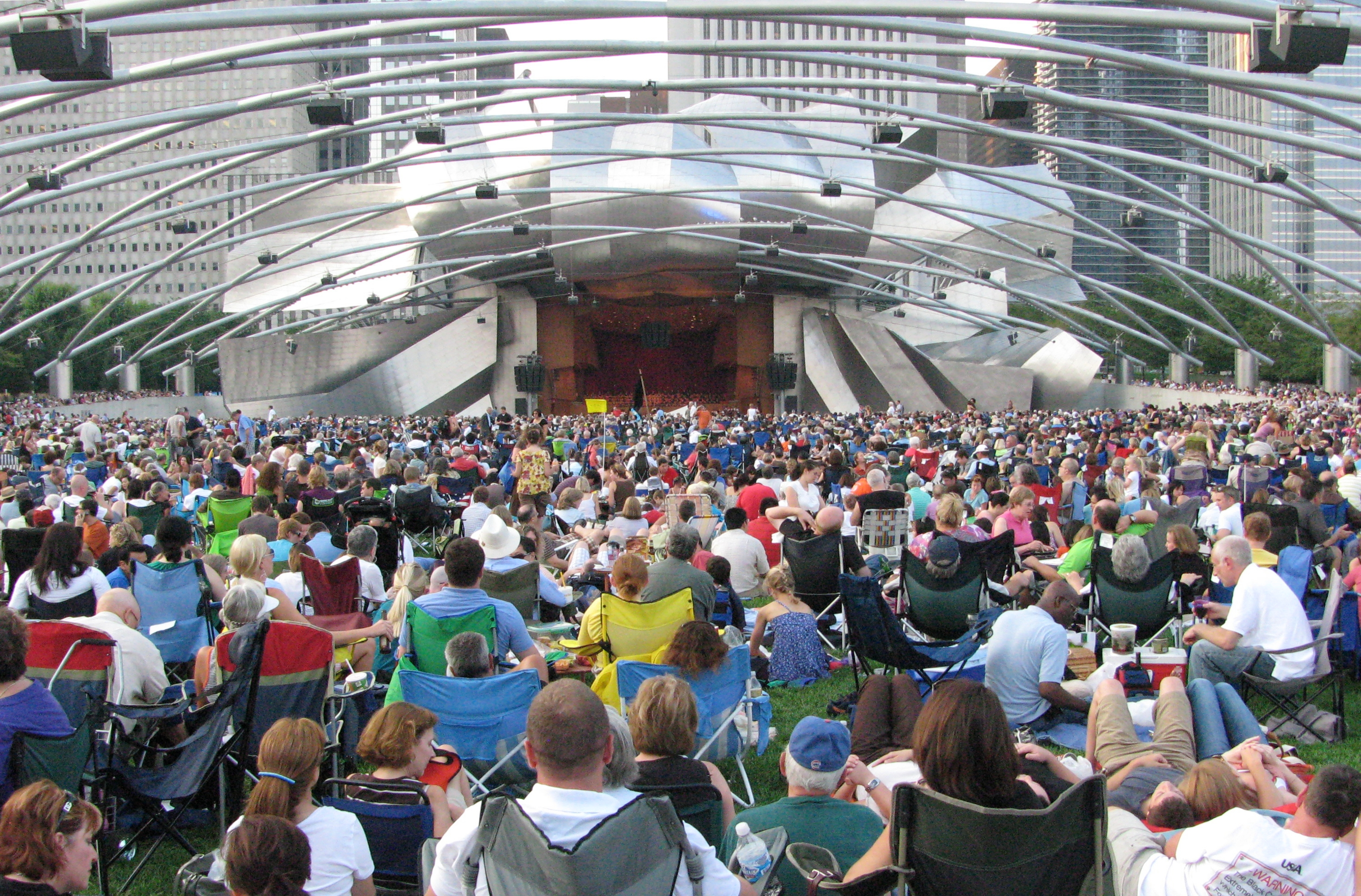
Concertgoers listen to Beethoven's Ninth Symphony at the Jay Pritzker Pavilion, the centerpiece of Millennium Park.

The centerpiece of Millennium Park is the Jay Pritzker Pavilion, a bandshell designed by Frank Gehry. The pavilion has 4,000 fixed seats, plus additional lawn seating for 7,000; the stage is framed by curving plates of stainless steel, characteristic of Gehry. It was named after Jay Pritzker, whose family is known for owning Hyatt Hotels and was a major donor. The Pritzker Pavilion is Grant Park's outdoor performing arts venue for small events, and complements Petrillo Music Shell, the park's older and larger bandshell. The pavilion is built partially atop the Harris Theater for Music and Dance, the park's indoor performing arts venue, with which it shares a loading dock and backstage facilities. The pavilion is seen as a major upgrade from the Petrillo Music Shell for those events it hosts. Initially, the pavilion's lawn seats were free for all concerts, but this changed when Tori Amos performed the first rock concert there on August 31, 2005.

The Pritzker Pavilion is the home of the Grant Park Symphony Orchestra and Chorus and the Grant Park Music Festival, the nation's only remaining free, municipally supported, outdoor, classical music series. The Festival is presented by the Chicago Park District and the Chicago Department of Cultural Affairs. The Pavilion hosts a wide range of other music series and annual performing arts events. Performers ranging from mainstream rock bands to classical musicians and opera singers have appeared at the pavilion, which also hosts physical fitness activities such as yoga. All rehearsals at the pavilion are open to the public; trained guides are available for the music festival rehearsals, which are well-attended.

The construction of the pavilion created a legal controversy, given that there are historic limitations on buildings in Grant Park. To avoid these legal restrictions, the city classifies the bandshell as a work of art rather than a building. With several design and assembly problems, the construction plans were revised over time, with features eliminated and others added as successful fundraising allowed the budget to grow. In the end, the performance venue was designed with a large fixed seating area, a Great Lawn, a trellis network to support the sound system, and a headdress fashioned from signature Gehry stainless steel. It features a sound system with an acoustic design that replicates an indoor concert hall sound experience. The pavilion and Millennium Park have received favorable recognition by critics, especially for their accessibility; an accessibility award ceremony held at the pavilion in 2005 described it as "one of the most accessible parks—not just in the United States but possibly the world".

=== Grainger Plaza and Cloud Gate ===
The Grainger Plaza (formerly AT&T Plaza) is a public space that hosts the Cloud Gate sculpture. The plaza opened in July 2004 with the unveiling of the sculpture during the grand opening weekend of the park. Ameritech donated $3 million for the naming right for the plaza, but it was SBC Plaza when the park opened, as a merger had changed the company name to SBC Communications. The 2005 merger of SBC and AT&T Corporation led to the name AT&T Plaza. In 2021, the Grainger Foundation established a $5 million endowment to support the ongoing enhancement of the plaza (now called Grainger Plaza) and Cloud Gate. The sculpture and the Grainger Plaza are located on top of Park Grill, between the Chase Promenade and McCormick Tribune Plaza & Ice Rink. The plaza has become a place to view the McCormick Tribune Plaza & Ice Rink. During the holiday season, the plaza hosts Christmas caroling.

Cloud Gate, dubbed "The Bean" by Chicagoans because of its legume-like shape, is a three-story reflective steel sculpture. The first public artwork in the United States by world-renowned artist Anish Kapoor, the privately funded piece cost $23 million, considerably more than the original estimate of $6 million. Composed of 168 stainless steel plates welded together, its highly polished exterior has no visible seams. It is 33 by 66 by 42 feet (10 m × 20 m × 13 m) and weighs 110 short tons (100 t; 98 long tons). Its smooth shape and mirror-like surface were inspired by liquid mercury. It reflects the city skyline, particularly the historic Michigan Avenue "streetwall", and the sky. It provides striking reflections of visitors, who can walk around and under its 12-foot (3.7 m) high arch. On the underside is the "omphalos" (Greek for "navel"), a concave chamber that warps and multiplies reflections. The sculpture builds upon many of Kapoor's artistic themes, and is a popular photo subject with tourists.

After Kapoor's design for the sculpture was selected in a design competition, numerous technological concerns regarding its construction and assembly arose, in addition to concerns about the sculpture's upkeep and maintenance. Experts were consulted, some of whom believed the design could not be implemented. Eventually, a feasible method was found, but the sculpture's construction fell behind schedule. Cloud Gate was unveiled in an incomplete form during the Millennium Park grand opening celebration, as the grid of welds around each metal panel was still visible. The sculpture was concealed again while it was completed; in early 2005, workers polished out the seams. Cloud Gate was formally dedicated on May 15, 2006, and it has since gained considerable popularity, domestically and internationally.

=== Crown Fountain ===
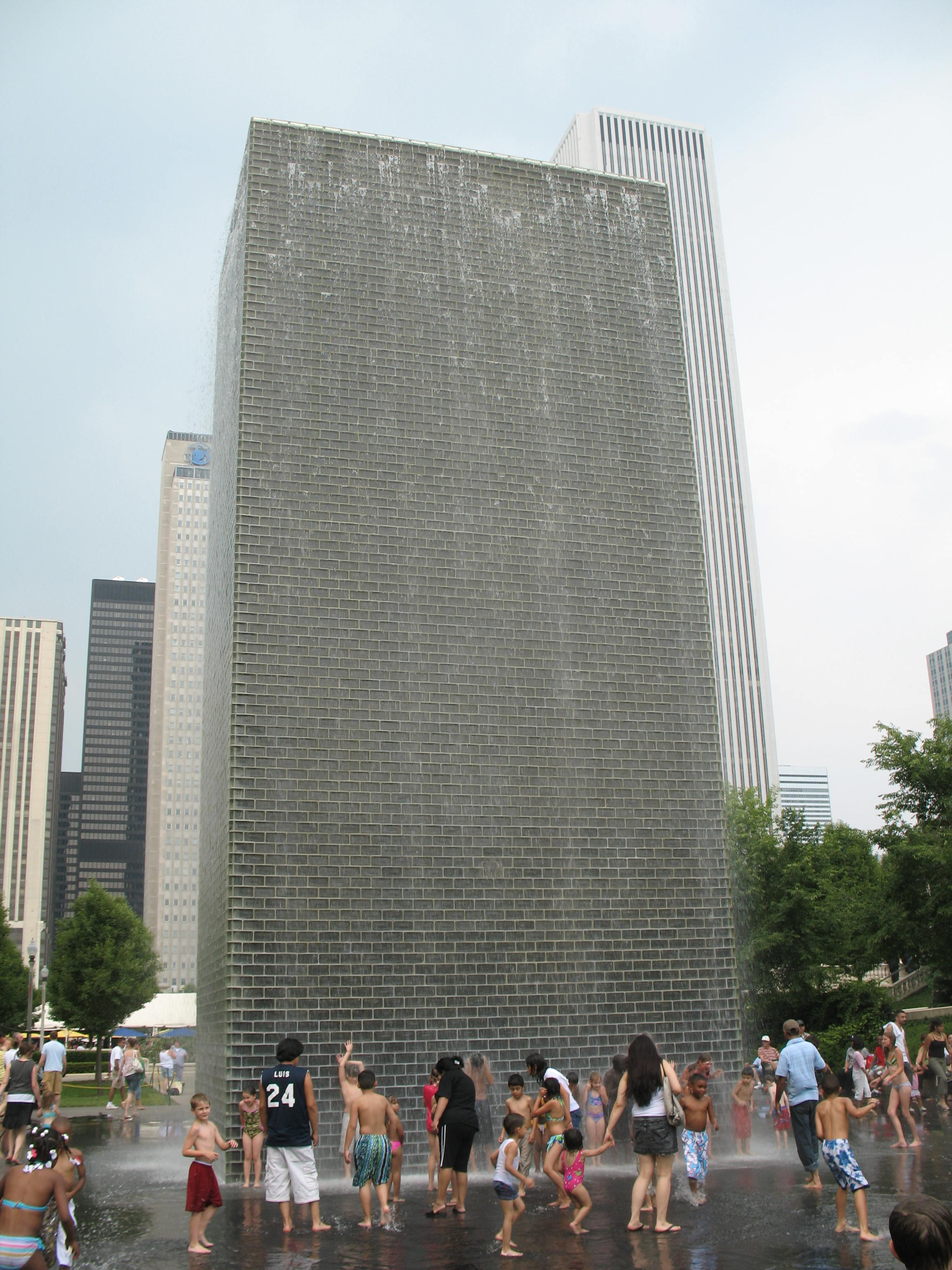
Videos are displayed on Crown Fountain. Water falls from the top between videos.

The Crown Fountain is an interactive work of public art and video sculpture, named in honor of Chicago's Crown family and opened in July 2004. It was designed by Catalan conceptual artist Jaume Plensa and executed by Krueck and Sexton Architects. The fountain is composed of a black granite reflecting pool placed between a pair of transparent glass brick towers. The towers are 50 feet (15 m) tall, and use light-emitting diodes behind the bricks to display digital videos on their inward faces. Construction and design of the Crown Fountain cost $17 million.

Weather permitting, the water operates from May to October, intermittently cascading down the two towers and spouting through a nozzle on each tower's front face. To achieve the effect in which water appears to be flowing from subjects' mouths, each video has a segment where the subject's lips are puckered, which is then timed to correspond to the spouting water, reminiscent of gargoyle fountains; this happens roughly every five minutes. The park and fountain are open to the public daily from 6 a.m. to 11 p.m.

Residents and critics have praised the fountain for its artistic and entertainment features. It highlights Plensa's themes of dualism, light, and water, extending the use of video technology from his prior works. The fountain promotes physical interaction between the public and the water in an artistic setting. Both the fountain and Millennium Park are highly accessible because of their universal design.

The Crown Fountain has been the most controversial of all the Millennium Park features. Before it was built, some were concerned that the sculpture's height violated the aesthetic tradition of the park. New concerns were raised after the construction when the surveillance cameras were installed atop the fountain, which led to a public outcry (and their quick removal). However, the fountain has survived its somewhat contentious beginnings to find its way into Chicago pop culture. It is a popular subject for photographers and a common gathering place. While some of the videos displayed are of scenery, most attention has focused on its video clips of local residents, in which almost a thousand Chicagoans randomly appear on two screens. The fountain is a public play area and offers people an escape from summer heat, allowing children to frolic in the fountain's water.

=== Lurie Garden ===
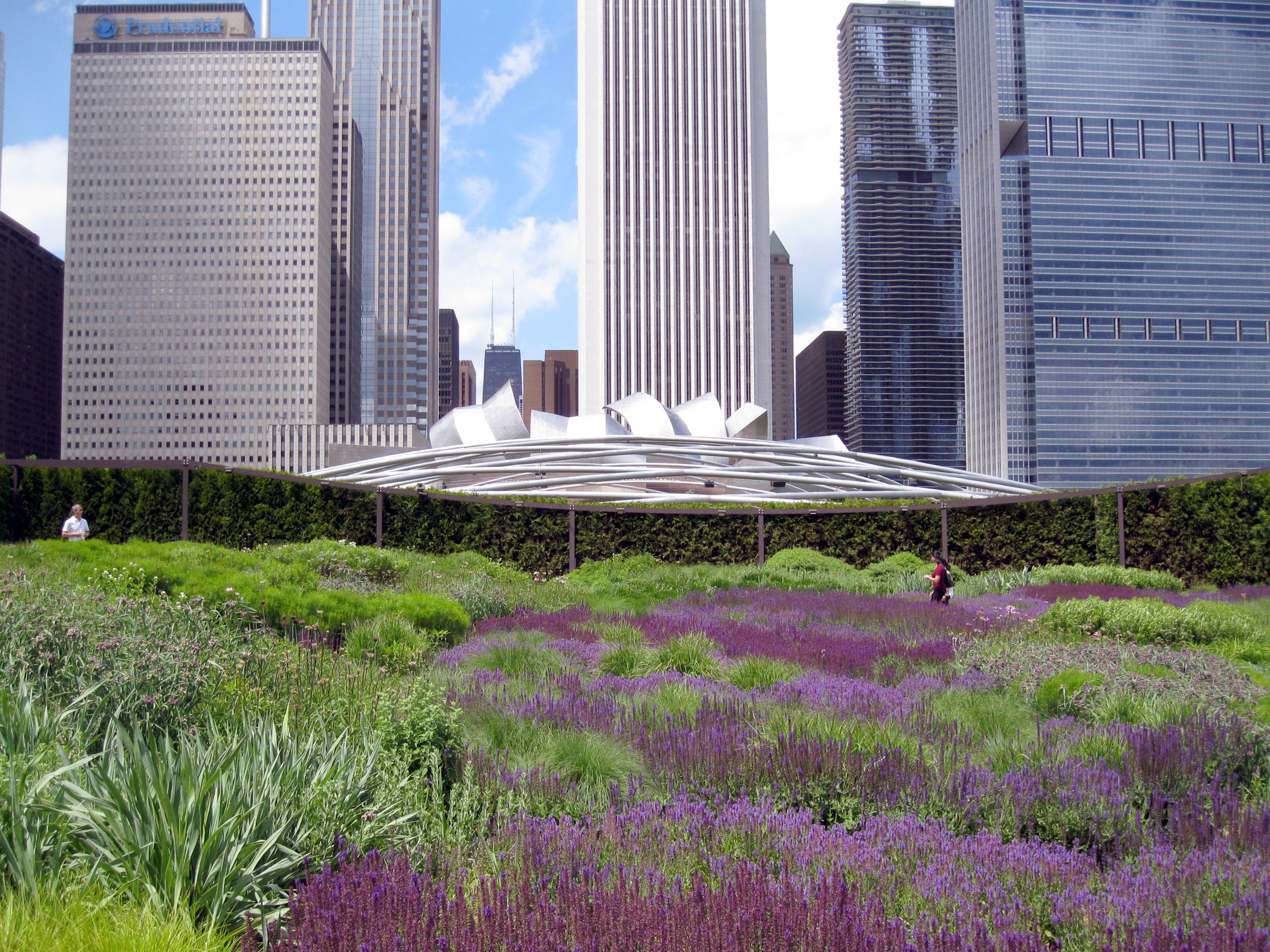
Lurie Garden with Pritzker Pavilion and Randolph Street skyscrapers in the background

The Lurie Garden is a 2.5-acre (1.0 ha) public garden located at the southern end of Millennium Park; designed by landscape architecture firm GGN (Gustafson Guthrie Nichol), Piet Oudolf, and Robert Israel, it opened on July 16, 2004. The garden is a combination of perennials, bulbs, native prairie grasses, shrubs and trees. It is the featured nature component of the world's largest green roof. The garden cost $13.2 million and has a $10 million financial endowment for maintenance and upkeep. It was named after philanthropist Ann Lurie, who donated the $10 million endowment. The garden is a tribute to the city, whose motto is "Urbs in Horto", Latin for "City in a Garden". The Lurie Garden is composed of two "plates". The dark plate depicts Chicago's history by presenting shade-loving plants, and has a combination of trees that will provide a shade canopy for these plants when they fill in. The light plate, which has no trees, represents the city's future with sun-loving perennials that thrive in heat and light.

=== McCormick Tribune Plaza & Ice Rink and Park Grill ===
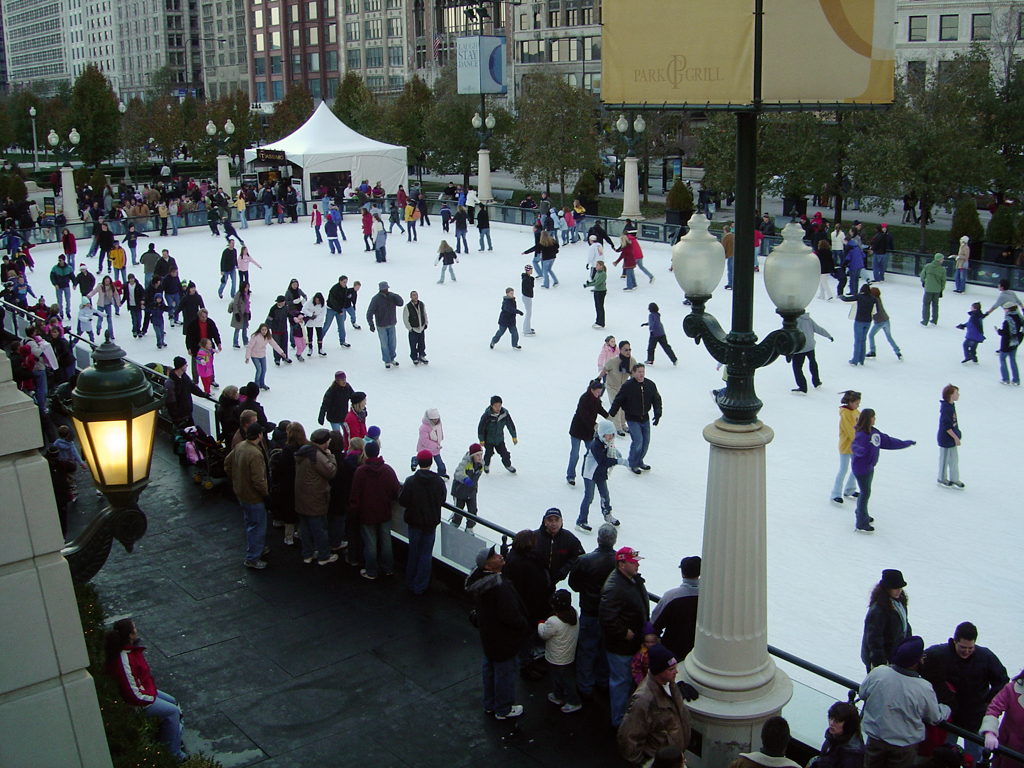
The McCormick Tribune Ice Skating Rink is a popular people-watching venue.

The McCormick Tribune Plaza & Ice Rink is a multipurpose venue located along the western edge of Millennium Park opposite the streetwall of the Historic Michigan Boulevard District. On December 20, 2001, it became the first attraction in Millennium Park to open, a few weeks ahead of the Millennium Park underground parking garage. The $3.2 million plaza was funded by a donation from the McCormick Tribune Foundation. For four months a year, it operates as McCormick Tribune Ice Rink, a free public outdoor ice skating rink. It is generally open for skating from mid-November until mid-March and hosts over 100,000 skaters annually. It is known as one of Chicago's better outdoor people watching locations during the winter months. The rink is operated by the Chicago Department of Cultural Affairs rather than the Chicago Park District, which operates most major public ice skating rinks in Chicago.

For the rest of the year, it serves as The Plaza at Park Grill or Park Grill Plaza, Chicago's largest al fresco dining facility. The 150-seat outdoor restaurant offers scenic views of the park, and hosts various culinary events and musical performances during its months of operation. From June 21 to September 15, 2002, the plaza served as an open-air exhibition space and hosted the inaugural exhibit in Millennium Park, Exelon Presents Earth From Above by Yann Arthus-Bertrand, a French aerial photographer.

The Park Grill Plaza is affiliated with the 300-seat indoor Park Grill restaurant, located beneath the Grainger Plaza and Cloud Gate. The Park Grill is the only full-service restaurant in Millennium Park and opened on November 24, 2003. It regularly places among the leaders in citywide best-of competitions for best burger, and it is widely praised for its views. The restaurant has been the focus of controversies about the numerous associates of Mayor Daley who are investors, its exclusive location and lucrative contract terms. One of the most financially successful restaurants in Chicago, the Park Grill remains exempt from property taxes after a multi-year litigation which reached the appellate courts in Illinois.

=== BP Pedestrian Bridge ===
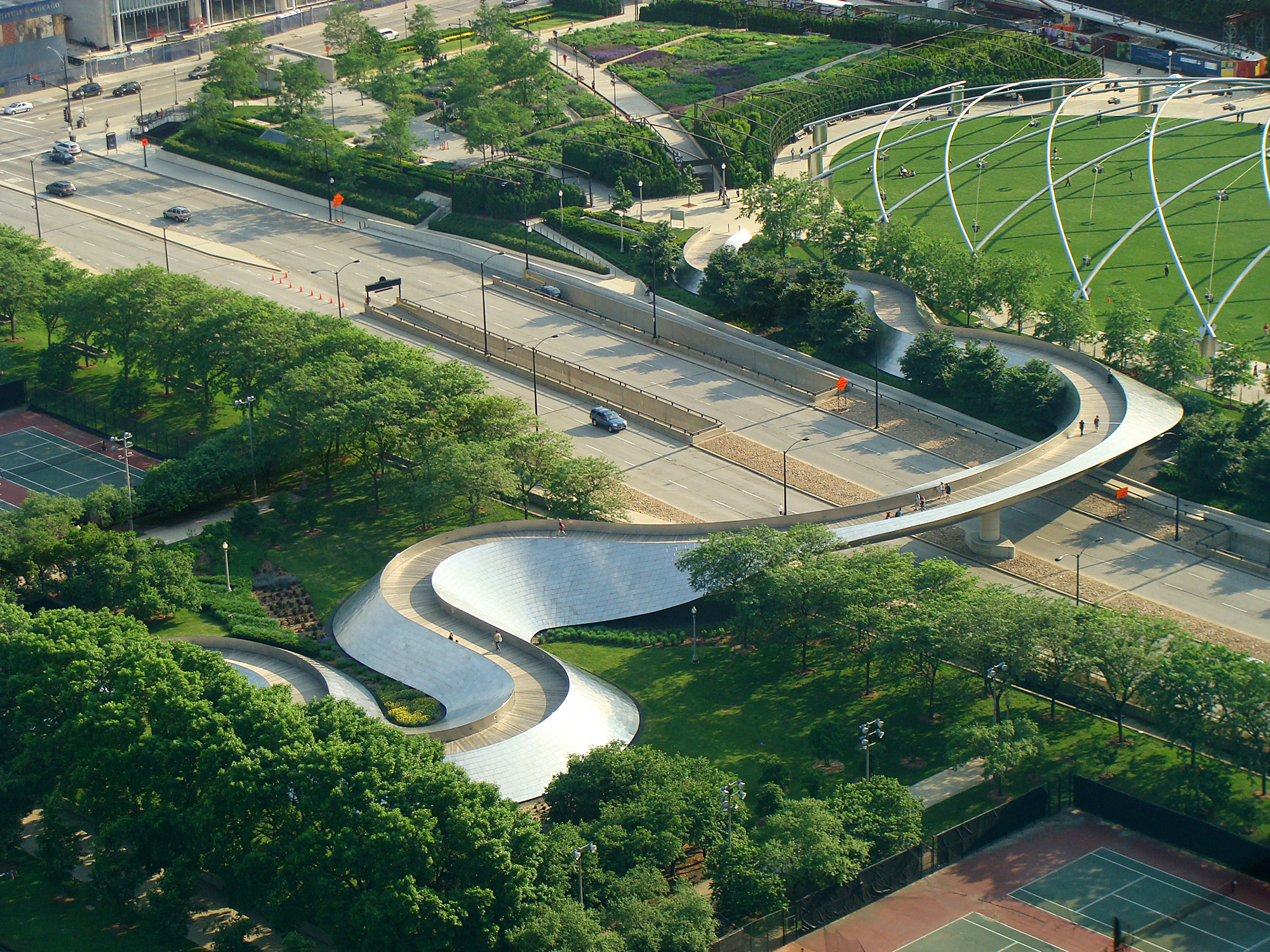
The serpentine BP Pedestrian Bridge is architect Frank Gehry's first bridge.

The BP Pedestrian Bridge is a girder footbridge over Columbus Drive that connects Millennium Park with Maggie Daley Park (formerly, Daley Bicentennial Plaza), both parts of the larger Grant Park. The pedestrian bridge is the first bridge Gehry designed to be built, and was named for BP plc, which donated $5 million to the construction of the park. It opened on July 16, 2004, along with the rest of Millennium Park. Gehry had been courted by the city to design the bridge and the neighboring Jay Pritzker Pavilion, and eventually agreed to do so after the Pritzker family funded the Pavilion. The bridge is known for its aesthetics, and Gehry's style is seen in its biomorphic allusions and extensive sculptural use of stainless steel plates to express abstraction. The bridge is referred to as snakelike in character due to its curving form. The bridge's design, which meets highway standards to accommodate rushes of pedestrian traffic simultaneously exiting Pritzker Pavilion events, enables it to bear a heavy load.

The pedestrian bridge serves as a noise barrier for the pavilion, blocking traffic sounds from Columbus Drive. It is a connecting link between Millennium Park and destinations to the east, such as the nearby lakefront, other parts of Grant Park and a parking garage. The BP Bridge uses a concealed box girder design with a concrete base, and its deck is covered by hardwood floor boards. It is designed without handrails, using stainless steel parapets instead. The total length is 935 feet (285 m), with a five percent slope on its inclined surfaces that makes it barrier-free and accessible. It has won awards for its use of sheet metal. Although the bridge is closed in winter because ice cannot be safely removed from its wooden walkway, it has received favorable reviews for its design and aesthetics.

=== Harris Theater ===
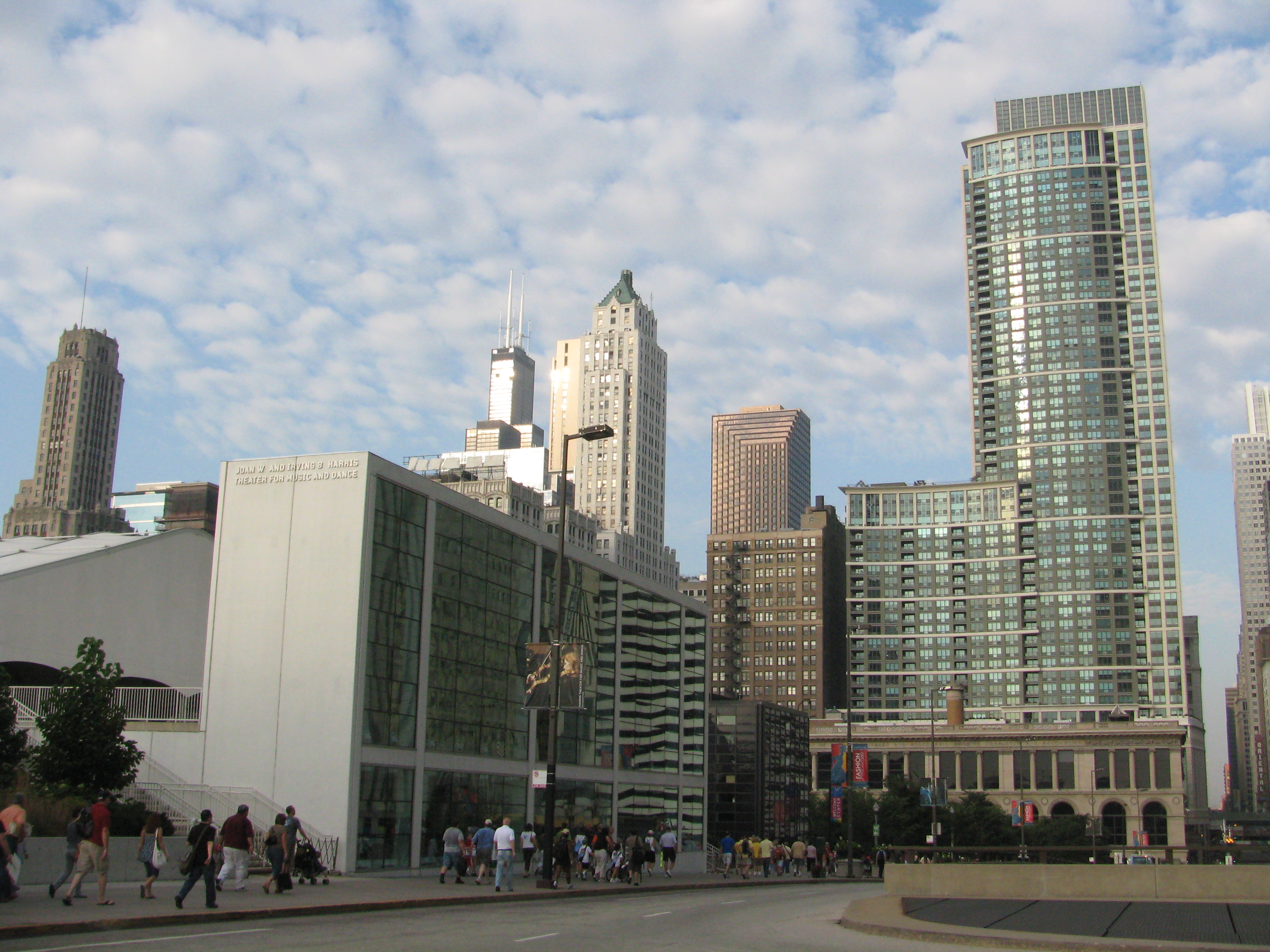
Harris Theater from Randolph Street

The Joan W. and Irving B. Harris Theater for Music and Dance is a 1525-seat theater for the performing arts located along the northern edge of Millennium Park. Constructed in 2002–03, it is the city's premier performance venue for small- and medium-sized performance groups, which had previously been without a permanent home and were underserved by the city's performing venue options. The theater, which is largely underground due to Grant Park-related height restrictions, was named for its primary benefactors, Joan and Irving Harris. It serves as the park's indoor performing venue, a compliment to Jay Pritzker Pavilion, which hosts the park's outdoor performances. Among the regularly featured local groups are the Joffrey Ballet, Hubbard Street Dance Chicago and Chicago Opera Theater. It provides subsidized rental, technical expertise, and marketing support for the companies using it, and turned a profit in its fourth fiscal year.

The Harris Theater has hosted notable national and international performers, such as the New York City Ballet, which made its first visit to Chicago in over 25 years (in 2006). The theater began offering subscription series of traveling performers in its 2008–09 fifth anniversary season. Performances through this series have included the San Francisco Ballet, Mikhail Baryshnikov, and Stephen Sondheim.

The theater has been credited as contributing to the performing arts renaissance in Chicago, and it has been favorably reviewed for its acoustics, sightlines, proscenium and for providing a home base for numerous performing organizations. Although it is seen as a high-caliber venue for its music audiences, the theater is regarded as less than ideal for jazz groups, because it is more expensive and larger than most places where jazz is performed. The design has been criticized for traffic flow problems, with an elevator bottleneck. However, the theater's prominent location and its underground design to preserve Millennium Park have been praised. Although there were complaints about high-priced events in its early years, discounted ticket programs were introduced in the 2009–10 season.

=== Wrigley Square ===
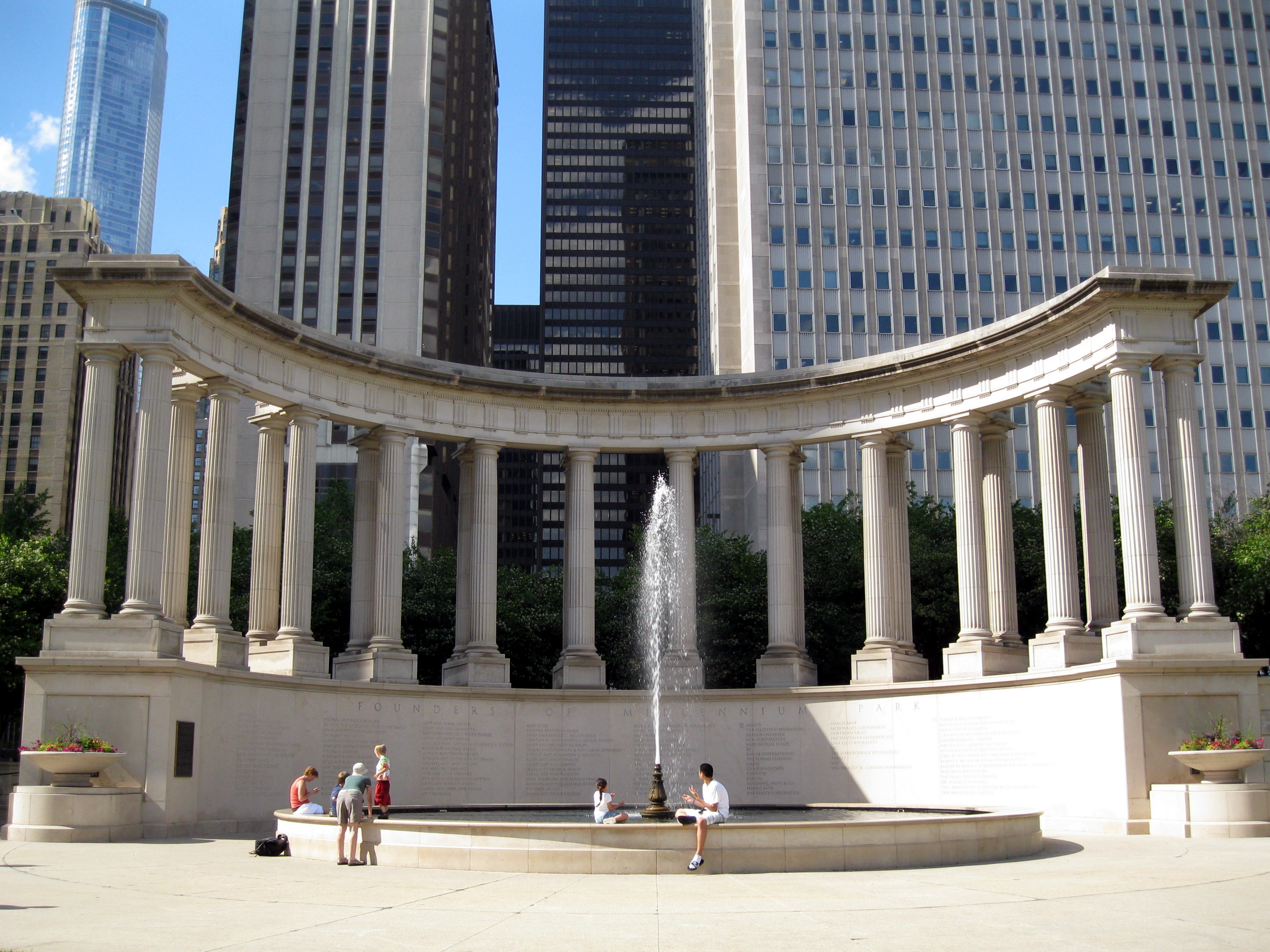
The Millennium Monument in Wrigley Square

Wrigley Square is a public square located in the northwest corner of Millennium Park near the intersection of East Randolph Street and North Michigan, across from the Historic Michigan Boulevard District. It contains the Millennium Monument, a nearly full-sized replica of the semicircle of paired Greek Doric-style columns (called a peristyle) that originally sat in this area of Grant Park between 1917 and 1953. The square also contains a large lawn and a public fountain. The William Wrigley, Jr. Foundation contributed $5 million for the monument and square, which was named in its honor. The pedestal of the Millennium Monument's peristyle is inscribed with the names of the 115 financial donors who made the 91 contributions of at least $1 million each to help pay for Millennium Park.

=== McDonald's Cycle Center ===
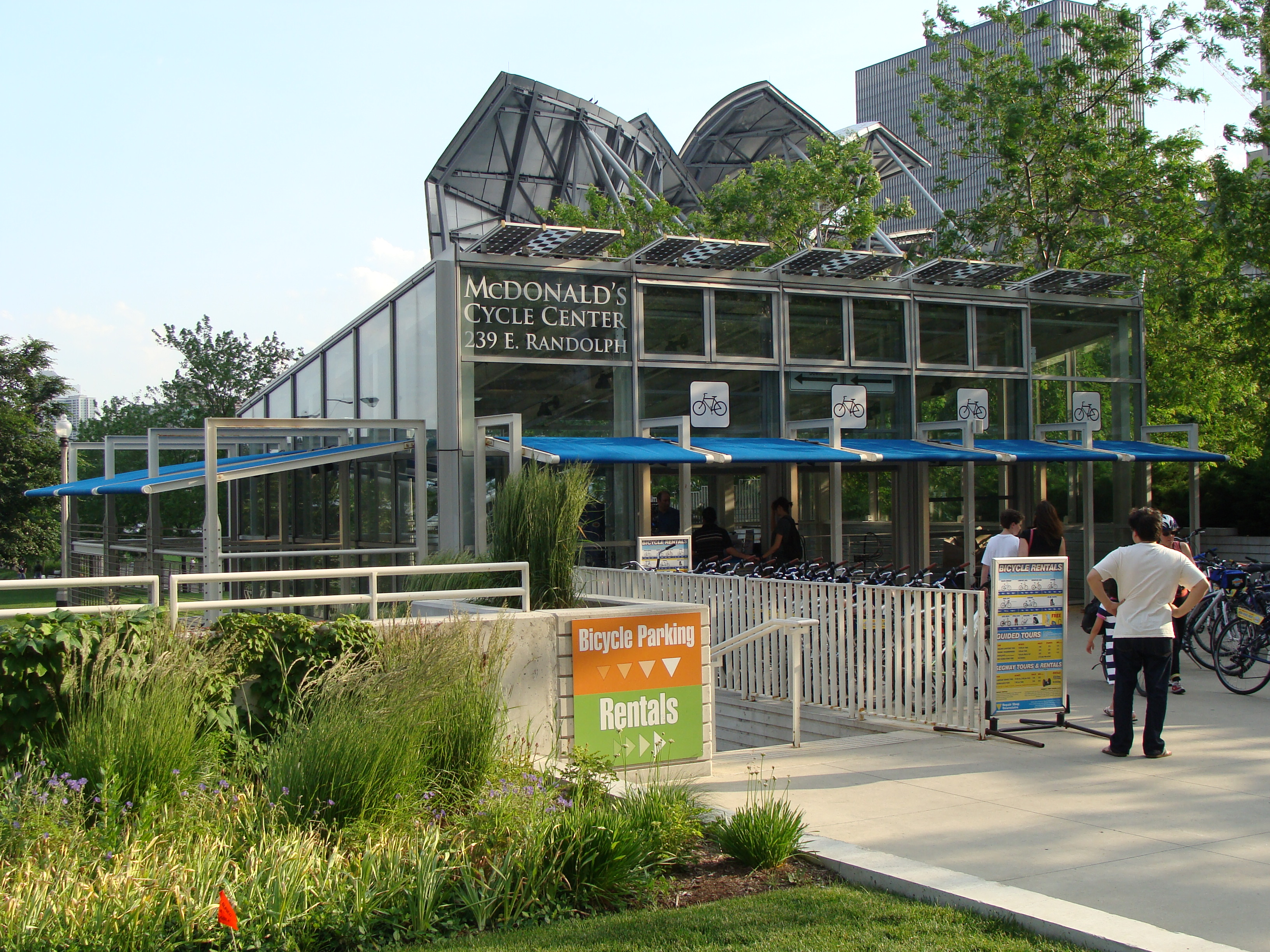
McDonald's Cycle Center was sponsored by McDonald's after the park opened.

The McDonald's Cycle Center is a 300-space heated and air conditioned indoor bike station located in the northeast corner of Millennium Park. The facility provides lockers, showers, a snack bar with outdoor summer seating, bike repair, bike rental and other amenities for downtown bicycle commuters and utility cyclists. The bike station also accommodates runners and in-line skaters, and provides space for a Chicago Police Department Bike Patrol Group. The city-built center opened in July 2004 as the Millennium Park Bike Station; since June 2006, it has been sponsored by McDonald's and several other partners, including city departments and bicycle advocacy organizations. Suburban Chicago-based McDonald's sponsorship of the Cycle Center fit in well with its efforts to help its customers become more healthy by encouraging "balanced, active lifestyles". The Cycle Center is accessible by membership and day pass.

Planning for the Cycle Center was part of the larger "Bike 2010 Plan", in which the city aimed to make itself more accommodating to bicycle commuters. This plan (since replaced by the "Bike 2015 Plan") included provisions for front-mounted two-bike carriers on Chicago Transit Authority (CTA) buses, permitting bikes to be carried on Chicago 'L' trains, installing numerous bike racks and creating bicycle lanes in streets throughout the city. Additionally, the Chicago metropolitan area's other mass transit providers, Metra and Pace, have developed increased bike accessibility. Mayor Daley was an advocate of the plan, noting it is also an environmentally friendly effort to cut down on traffic. Environmentalists, urban planners and cycling enthusiasts around the world have expressed interest in the Cycle Center, and want to emulate what they see as a success story in urban planning and transit-oriented development. Pro-cycling and environmentalist journalists in publications well beyond Chicago have described the Cycle Center as exemplary, impressive, unique and ground-breaking. The Toronto Star notes that it is revered as "a kind of Shangri-La", and describes it as "a jewel-like glass building on the Chicago waterfront, [that] has many of the amenities of an upscale health club ... close to the heart of the city", with the additional statement that "It's not heaven, but it's close". A Vancouver official told The Oregonian that it was "the ultimate in bicycle stations", and would be natural for bicycle friendly cities to emulate.

=== Exelon Pavilions ===
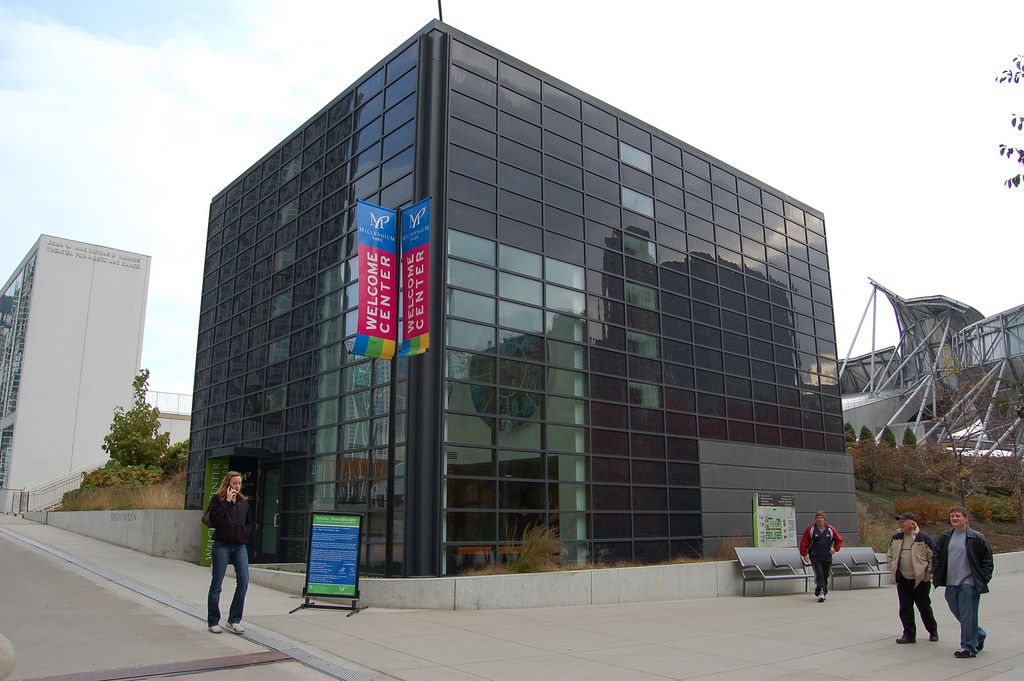
The Northwest Exelon Pavilion is Millennium Park's Welcome Center.

The Exelon Pavilions are a set of four solar energy-generating structures in Millennium Park. The pavilions provide sufficient energy to power the equivalent of 14 Energy star-rated energy-efficient houses in Chicago. The pavilions were designed in January 2001 and construction began in January 2004. The Southeast and Southwest Exelon Pavilions (jointly the South Exelon Pavilions) along Madison Street were completed and opened in July 2004, and flank the Lurie Garden. The Northeast and Northwest Exelon Pavilions (jointly the North Exelon Pavilions) flank the Harris Theater along Randolph Street and were completed in November 2004, with a grand opening on April 30, 2005. Besides producing energy, three of the four pavilions provide access to the park's underground parking garages and the fourth serves as the park's welcome center. Exelon, a company that generates the electricity transmitted by its subsidiary Commonwealth Edison, donated approximately $6 million for the pavilions.

=== Boeing Galleries ===
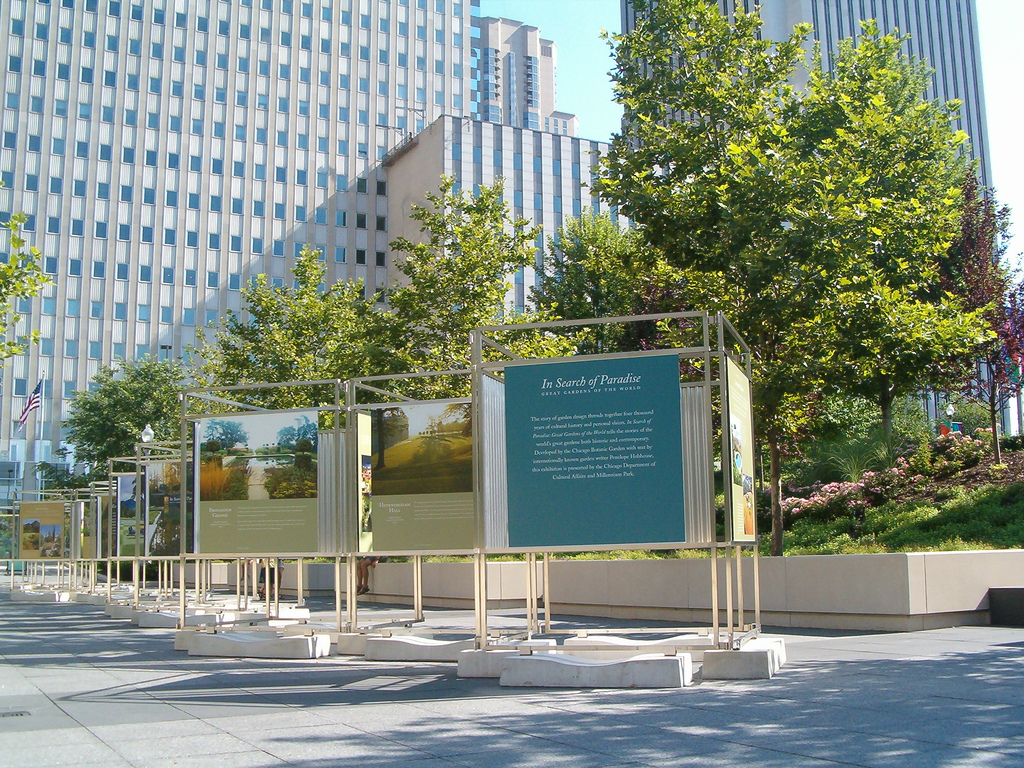
Boeing Galleries during the 2006 In Search of Paradise exhibition

The Boeing Galleries are a pair of outdoor exhibition spaces within Millennium Park; they are located along the south and north mid-level terraces, above and east of Wrigley Square and the Crown Fountain. They were added after the park opened; in March 2005, Boeing President and Chief Executive Officer James Bell announced the firm would make a $5 million grant to fund construction of the spaces, and for an endowment to "help fund visual arts exhibitions" in them. The galleries, which were built between March and June 2005, have hosted grand-scale art exhibits, some of which have run for two full summers.

=== Chase Promenade ===
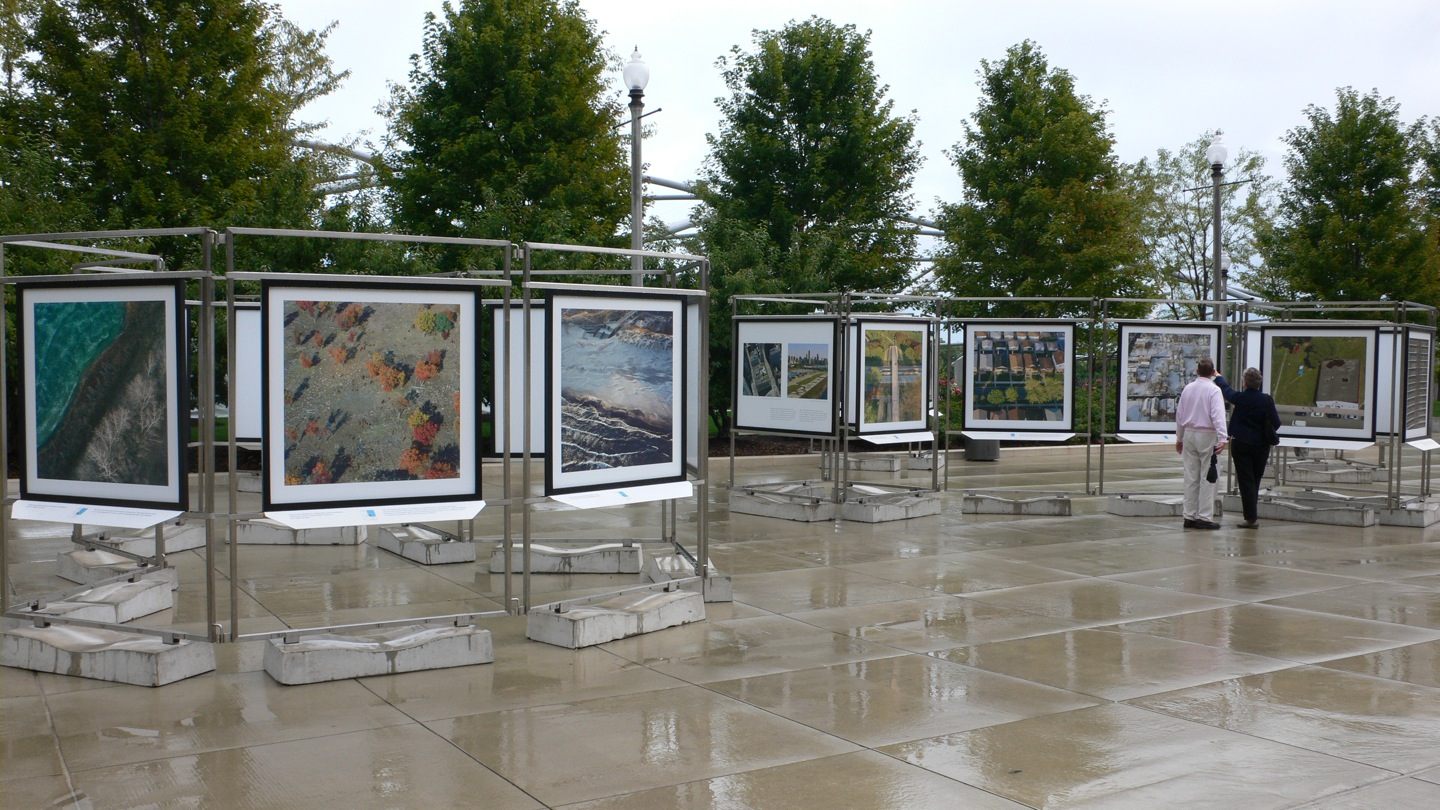
Chase Promenade during the 2005 Revealing Chicago exhibition

The Chase Promenade is an open-air tree-lined pedestrian walkway in Millennium Park that opened July 16, 2004. The promenade was made possible by a gift from the Bank One Foundation; Bank One merged with JPMorgan Chase in 2004, and the name became Chase Promenade. The 8-acre (3.2 ha) walkway accommodates exhibitions, festivals and other family events. It also serves as a private-event rental venue. The Chase Promenade hosted the 2009 Burnham Pavilions, which were the cornerstone of the citywide Burnham Plan centennial celebration.

=== Nichols Bridgeway ===
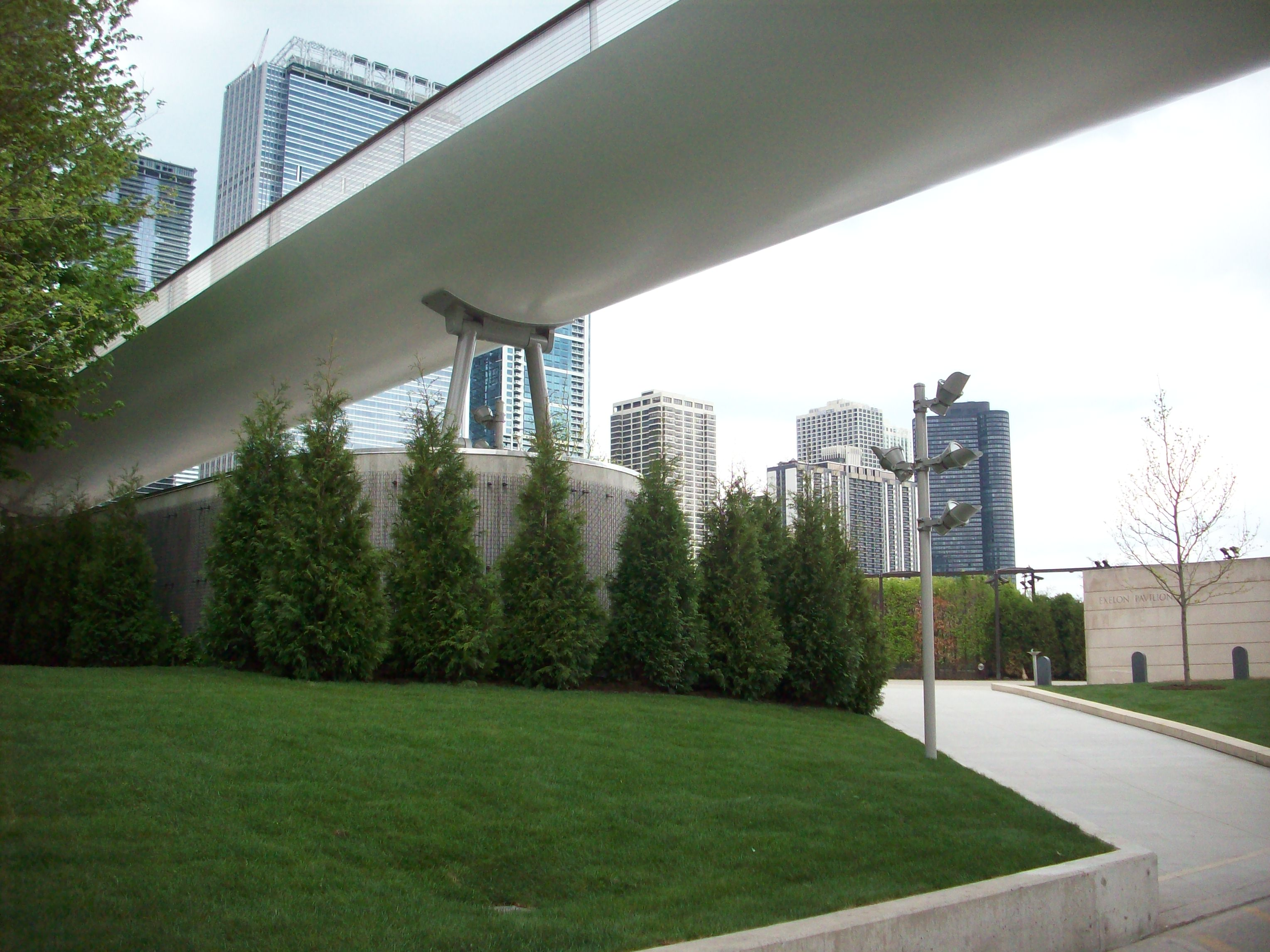
The Nichols Bridgeway's design was inspired by the hull of a boat

The Nichols Bridgeway, a pedestrian bridge that opened on May 16, 2009, connects the south end of Millennium Park with the Modern Wing of the Art Institute of Chicago. The bridge begins at the southwest end of the Jay Pritzker Pavilion's Great Lawn and extends across Monroe Street, where it connects to the third floor of the Art Institute's West Pavilion. The bridge design by Renzo Piano, the architect of the Modern Wing, was inspired by the hull of a boat.

The Nichols Bridgeway is approximately 620 ft (190 m) long and 15 ft (4.6 m) wide. The bottom of the bridge is made of white, painted structural steel, the floor is made of aluminum planking and the 42-inch (1.1 m) tall railings are steel set atop stainless steel mesh. The bridge features anti-slip walkways and heating elements to prevent the formation of ice. It meets standards for universal accessibility, as required by the Americans with Disabilities Act of 1990 (ADA). The bridge is named after museum donors Alexandra and John Nichols.

== Budget ==
During development and construction of the park, many structures were added, redesigned or modified. These changes often resulted in budget increases. For example, the bandshell's proposed budget was $10.8 million. When the elaborate, cantilevered Gehry design required extra pilings to be driven into the bedrock to support the added weight, the cost of the bandshell eventually spiraled to $60.3 million. The cost of the park, as itemized in the following table, amounted to almost $500 million.

Mayor Daley at first placed much of the blame for the delay and cost overrun on Frank Gehry, who designed the pavilion and its connecting bridge; Daley's office later apologized to the architect. A 2001 investigative report by the Chicago Tribune described the park then under construction and its budget overruns as an "expensive public-works debacle that can be traced to haphazard planning, design snafus and cronyism". According to Lois Weisberg, commissioner of the Department of Cultural Affairs, and James Law, executive director of the Mayor's Office of Special Events, once the full scope of the project was finalized the project was completed within the revised budget.

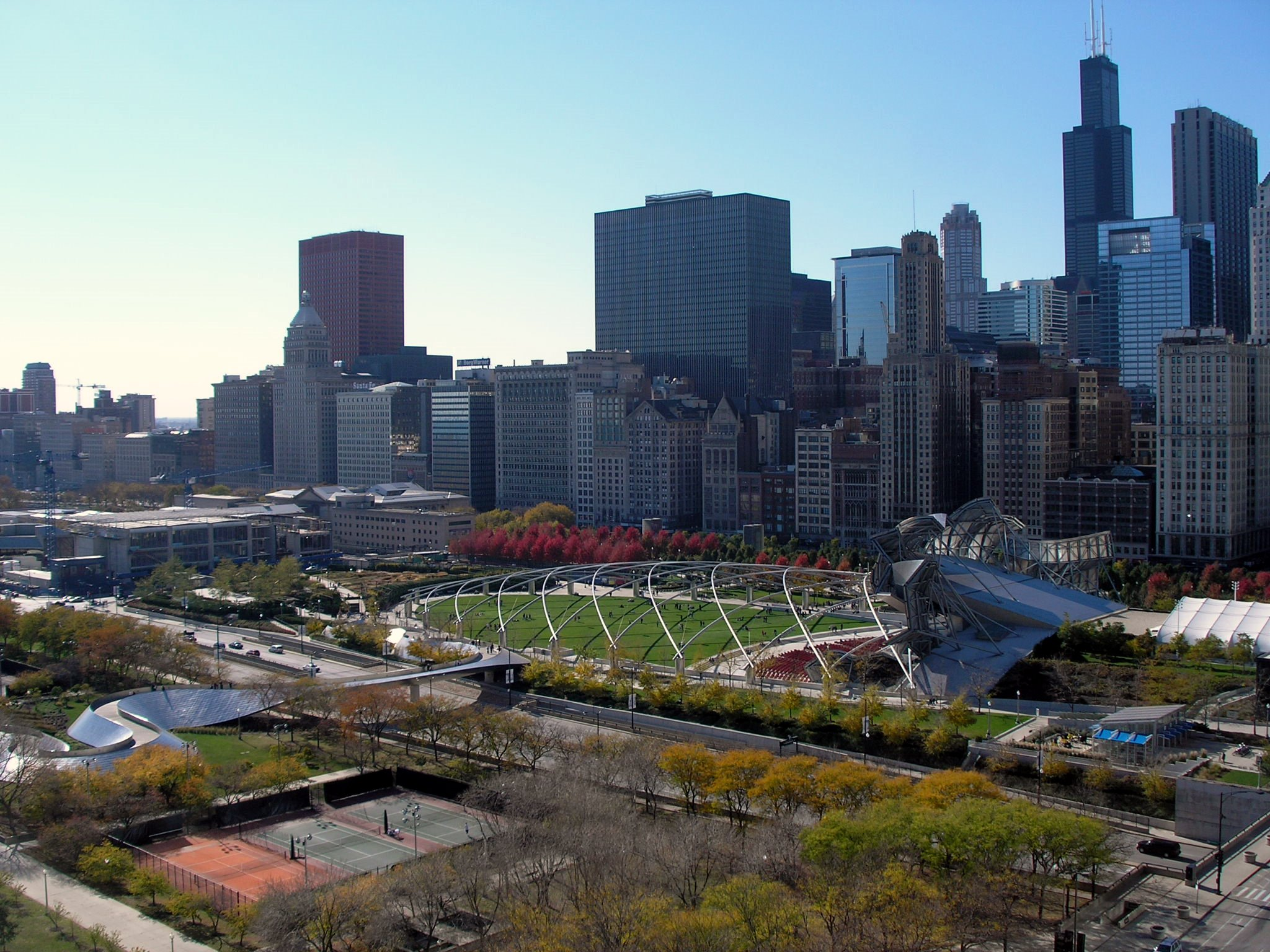
Millennium Park seen from 340 on the Park in 2007; the foreground is Richard J. Daley Bicentennial Plaza (also part of Grant Park, which has since been transformed into Maggie Daley Park). In the background are the Art Institute of Chicago and Historic Michigan Boulevard District.

Project	Proposed cost	Final cost	% of proposed
Garage	$87.5 million	$105.6 million	121%
Metra superstructure	$43.0 million	$60.6 million	141%
Jay Pritzker Pavilion	$10.8 million	$60.3 million	558%
Harris Theater	$20.0 million	$60.0 million	300%
Park finishes/landscaping	N/A	$42.9 million	
Design and management costs	N/A	$39.5 million	
Endowment	$10.0 million	$25.0 million	250%
Crown Fountain	$15.0 million	$17.0 million	113%
BP Pedestrian Bridge	$8.0 million	$14.5 million	181%
Lurie Garden	$4.0–8.0 million	$13.2 million	330%–165%
Cloud Gate sculpture	$6.0 million	$23.0 million	383%
Exelon Pavilions	N/A	$7.0 million	
Peristyle/Wrigley Square	$5.0 million	$5.0 million	100%
Chase Promenade	$6.0 million	$4.0 million	67%
McCormick Tribune Plaza & Ice Rink	$5.0 million	$3.2 million	64%
Misc. (fencing, terraces, graphics)	N/A	$1.6 million	
Total (uses higher Lurie Garden figure)	$224.3 million	$482.4 million	215%
Source: Chicago Tribune. Note: does not include Boeing Galleries or Nichols Bridgeway.

== Use ==
Millennium Park had 3 million visitors in its first year; annual attendance was projected to grow to between 3.31 and 3.65 million by 2010. According to Crain's Chicago Business, however, the park had about 4 million visitors in 2009. In addition to the different uses detailed for each of the permanent features (above), the park has hosted some other notable events, including the annual Grant Park Music Festival, and two temporary pavilions to mark the centennial of Daniel Burnham's 1909 Plan of Chicago. Millennium Park has also been featured in several films and television shows.

=== Grant Park Music Festival ===
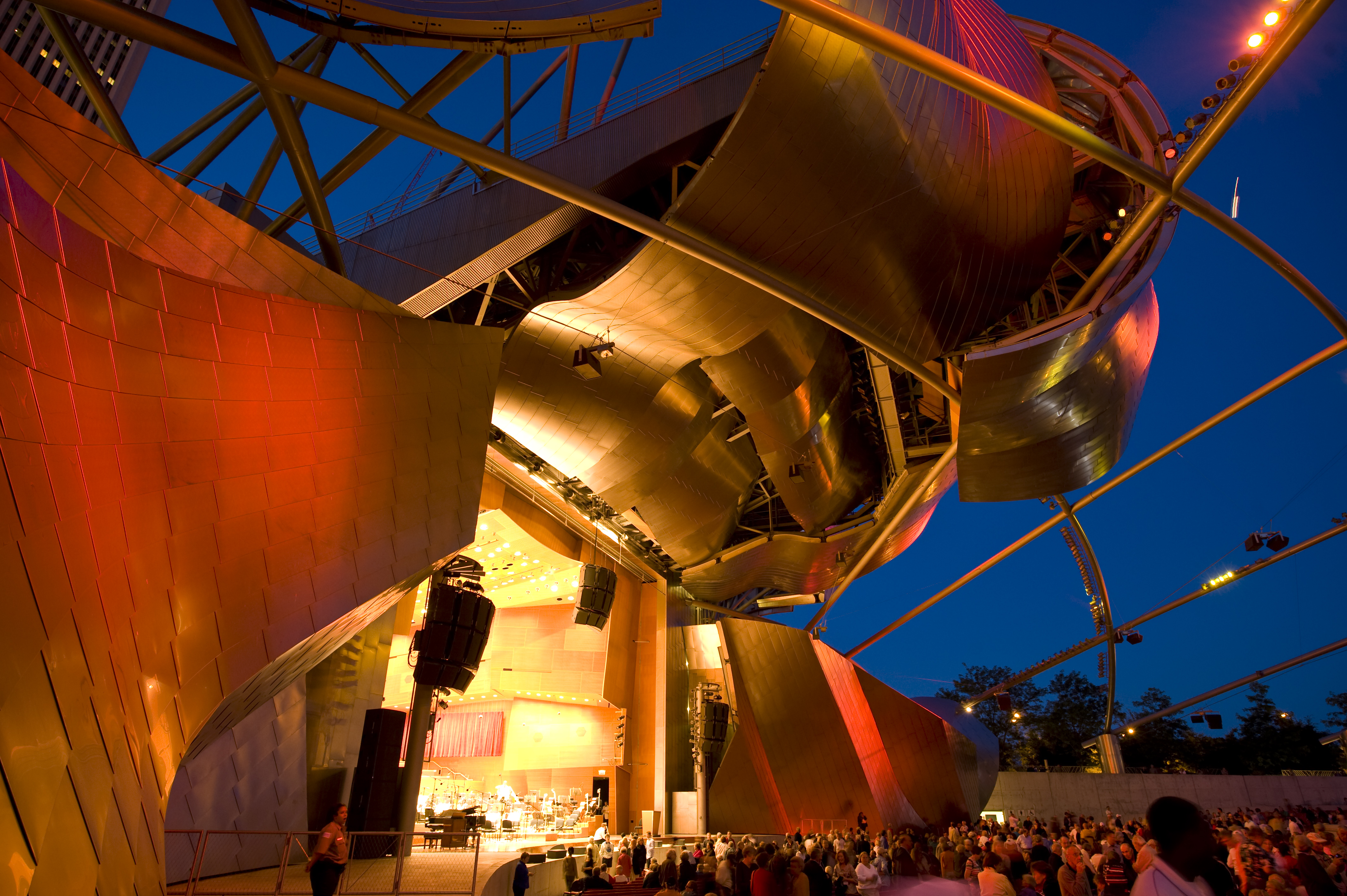
A 2005 Grant Park Music Festival concert at Jay Pritzker Pavilion

The Grant Park Music Festival (formerly Grant Park Concerts) is an annual 10-week classical music concert series, which features the Grant Park Symphony Orchestra and the Grant Park Chorus as well as guest performers and conductors. Since 2004, the festival has been housed in the Jay Pritzker Pavilion in Millennium Park. On occasion, the festival has been held at the Harris Theater instead of the Pritzker Pavilion. The festival has earned non-profit organization status, and claims to be the nation's only free, outdoor classical music series.

The Grant Park Music Festival has been a Chicago tradition since 1931, when Chicago Mayor Anton Cermak suggested free concerts to lift spirits of Chicagoans during the Great Depression. The tradition of symphonic Grant Park Music Festival concerts began in 1935. The 2004 season, during which the festival moved to the Pritzker Pavilion, was the event's 70th season. Formerly, the Grant Park Music Festival was held at the Petrillo Music Shell in Grant Park.

Over time the festival has had various financial supporters, three primary locations and one name change. At times it has been broadcast nationally on the National Broadcasting Corporation (NBC) and Columbia Broadcasting Service (CBS) radio networks, and many of the world's leading classical musicians have performed there. In 2000, the festival organizers agreed to release some of the concerts to the public via compact disc recordings.

=== Installation of Burnham Pavilions in 2009 ===
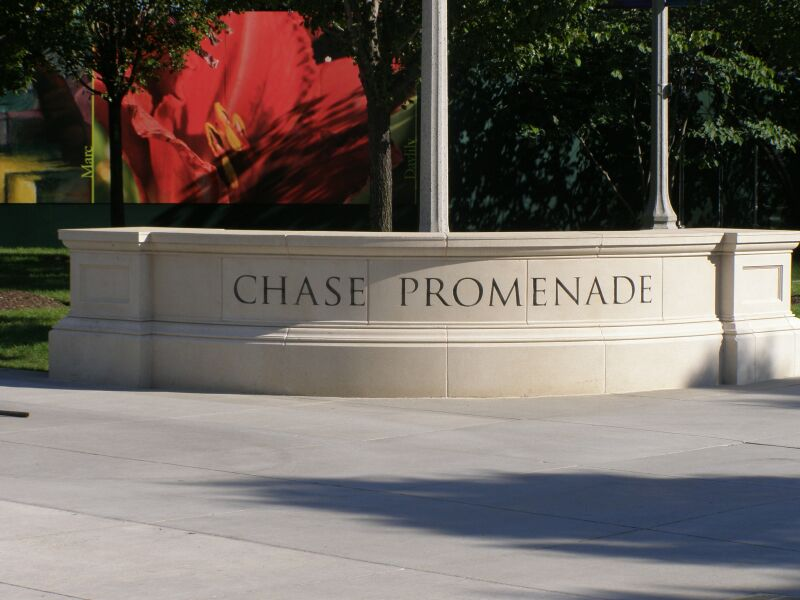
Chase Promenade South was the site of the Burnham Pavilions.

In 2009, architects Zaha Hadid and Ben van Berkel were invited to design and build two pavilions on the Chase Promenade South, to commemorate the 100th anniversary of Daniel Burnham's 1909 Plan of Chicago. The pavilions were privately funded and were designed to be temporary structures. They served as the focal point of Chicago's year-long celebration of Burnham's Plan, and were meant to symbolize the city's continued pursuit of the plan's architectural vision.

The van Berkel Pavilion was composed of two parallel rectangular planes joined by curving scoops, all built on a steel frame covered with glossy white plywood. It was situated on a raised platform, which was sliced by a ramp entrance, making it ADA accessible. The Hadid Pavilion was a tensioned fabric shell fitted over a curving aluminum framework made of more than 7,000 pieces. A centennial-themed video presentation was projected on its interior fabric walls after dark.

Both pavilions were scheduled to be unveiled on June 19, 2009. However, Hadid's pavilion was not ready in time; it had construction delays and a construction team change, which led to coverage of the delay in The New York Times and The Wall Street Journal. Only its aluminum skeleton was available for public viewing on the scheduled date; the work was completed and unveiled on August 4, 2009. The van Berkel pavilion was temporarily closed for repairs August 10–14, due to unanticipated wear and tear. Both pavilions were dismantled after November 1, 2009; the materials from van Berkel's were recycled, while Hadid's was stored for possible exhibition elsewhere.

=== Christmas tree ===
In October 2015, the city announced that its official annual Christmas tree lighting, which had been held at Daley Center since 1966 (except for 1982), would be held at the park in order that the official Christmas tree of the city could be closer to ice skating at McCormick Tribune Plaza & Ice Rink, the annual Christmas caroling at Cloud Gate and to the new offerings of the nearby Maggie Daley Park. The annual tree raising now occurs in the park near Michigan Avenue and Washington Street. Some parties opposed the move that separated the annual tree from the Christkindlmarket and the Chicago Picasso. The city's first official tree lighting by Mayor Carter Harrison, Jr. in 1913 had been held in Grant Park on Michigan Avenue two blocks south of the new location.

=== In popular culture ===
Jeff Garlin claims that I Want Someone to Eat Cheese With was the first Hollywood movie to incorporate Millennium Park. The film was not released until 2006, after the release of several other movies. These include the 2005 film The Weather Man, which starred Nicolas Cage and was filmed in part at the park's McCormick Tribune Plaza & Ice Rink. The 2006 romantic comedy The Break-Up shot scenes in the park, then had to reshoot some of them because Cloud Gate was under cover in some of the initial shots. Other movies which include scenes filmed in Millennium Park include the 2005 thriller Derailed, the 2006 romance The Lake House, and the 2007 thriller Butterfly on a Wheel. At least two television series have filmed in the park, including Leverage and Prison Break, which featured shots of the Crown Fountain in the first few episodes of its first season (2005). In the ending scene of Source Code (2011), Jake Gyllenhaal's and Michelle Monaghan's characters are seen walking through Millennium Park, and make their way to the Cloud Gate. In the 2012 romantic comedy, The Vow, the characters run from the Art Institute of Chicago across the Nichols Bridgeway to Millennium Park, where they kiss under Cloud Gate. The book series Divergent has several events set in the part, with mentions of the Cloud Gate sculpture (referred to as The Bean), the Jay Pritzker Pavilion, as well as the park itself, though it is only referred to as Millennium in the novel. The faction Erudite has their headquarters across from the park in the book series. The park was featured in the 2014 action-adventure video game Watch Dogs.

== Controversy ==
=== Height restrictions ===
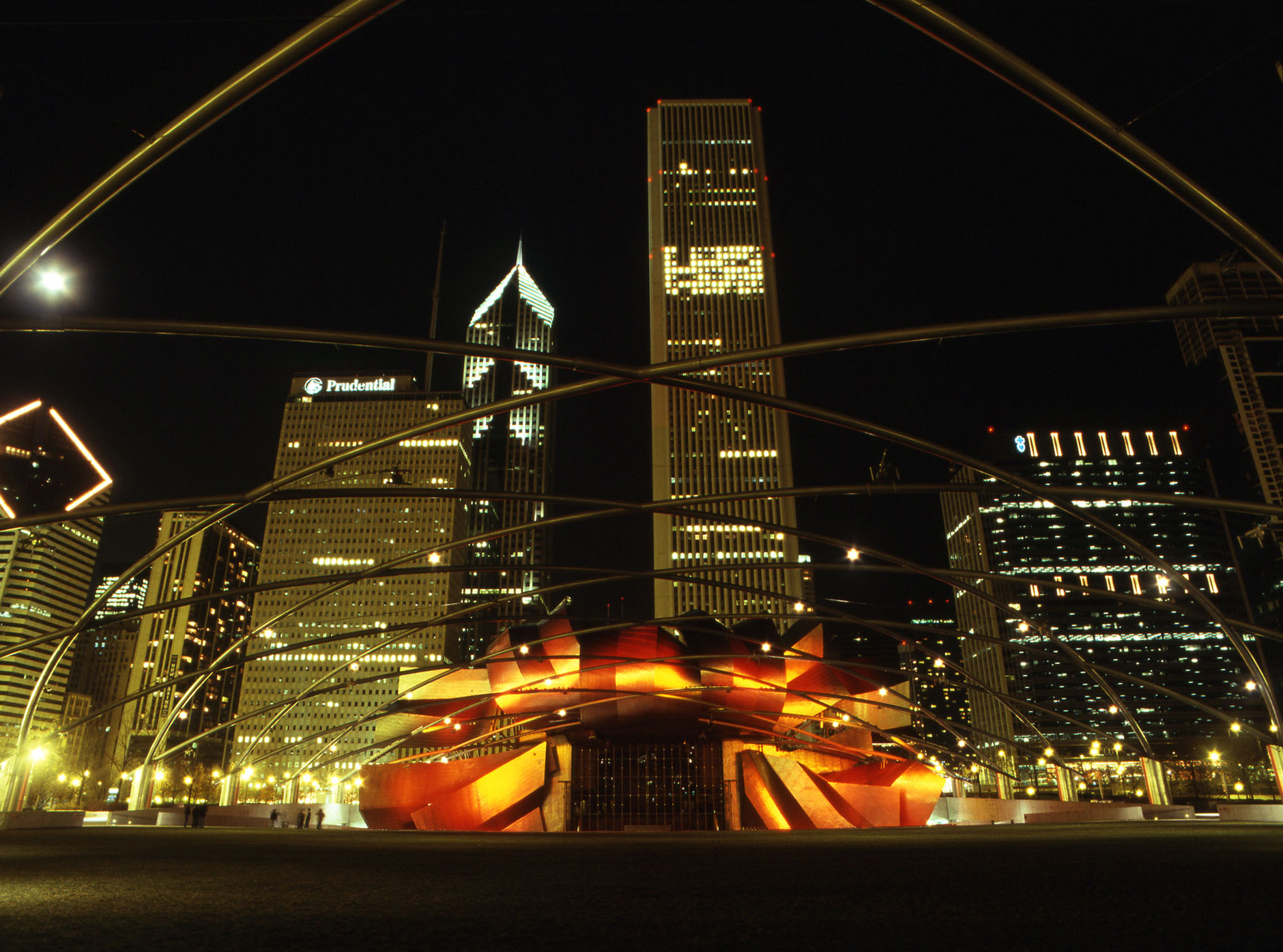
Jay Pritzker Pavilion is classified as a work of art to avoid legal restrictions on its height

In 1836, a year before Chicago was incorporated, the Board of Canal Commissioners held public auctions for the city's first lots. Foresighted citizens, who wanted the lakefront kept as public open space, convinced the commissioners to designate the land east of Michigan Avenue between Randolph Street and Park Row (11th Street) "Public Ground—A Common to Remain Forever Open, Clear and Free of Any Buildings, or Other Obstruction, whatever." Grant Park has been "forever open, clear and free" since, protected by legislation that has been affirmed by four previous Illinois Supreme Court rulings. In 1839, United States Secretary of War Joel Roberts Poinsett upon decommissioning the Fort Dearborn reserve, declared the land between Randolph Street and Madison Street east of Michigan Avenue "Public Ground forever to remain vacant of buildings".

Aaron Montgomery Ward, who is known both as the inventor of mail order and the protector of Grant Park, twice sued the city of Chicago to force it to remove buildings and structures from Grant Park and to keep it from building new ones. In 1890, arguing that Michigan Avenue property owners held easements on the park land, Ward commenced legal actions to keep the park free of new buildings. In 1900, the Illinois Supreme Court concluded that all landfill east of Michigan Avenue was subject to dedications and easements. In 1909, when Ward sought to prevent the construction of the Field Museum of Natural History in the center of the park, the courts affirmed his arguments.

As a result, the city has what are termed Montgomery Ward height restrictions on buildings and structures in Grant Park. However, the Crown Fountain and the 139-foot (42 m) Pritzker Pavilion were exempt from the height restrictions, because they were classified as works of art and not buildings or structures. According to The Economist, the pavilion is described as a work of art to dodge the protections established by Ward, who is said to continue to rule and protect Grant Park from his grave. The Harris Theater, which is adjacent to Pritzker Pavilion, was built almost entirely underground to avoid the height restrictions. The height of the Crown Fountain, which is also exempted as a work of art, has been described as stemming from a "pissing contest" with other park feature artists.

=== Financial issues ===
The Millennium Park project has been the subject of some criticism since its inception. In addition to concerns about cost overruns, individuals and organizations have complained that the money spent on the park might have gone to other worthy causes. Although the park's design and architectural elements have won wide praise, there has been some criticism of its aesthetics. Other criticism has revolved around the larger issue of political favors in the city. The New York Times reported in July 2004 that a contract for park cleanup had gone to a company that made contributions to Mayor Daley's election campaign. The park's full-service restaurant, Park Grill, has been criticized for its connection to numerous friends and associates of the mayor.

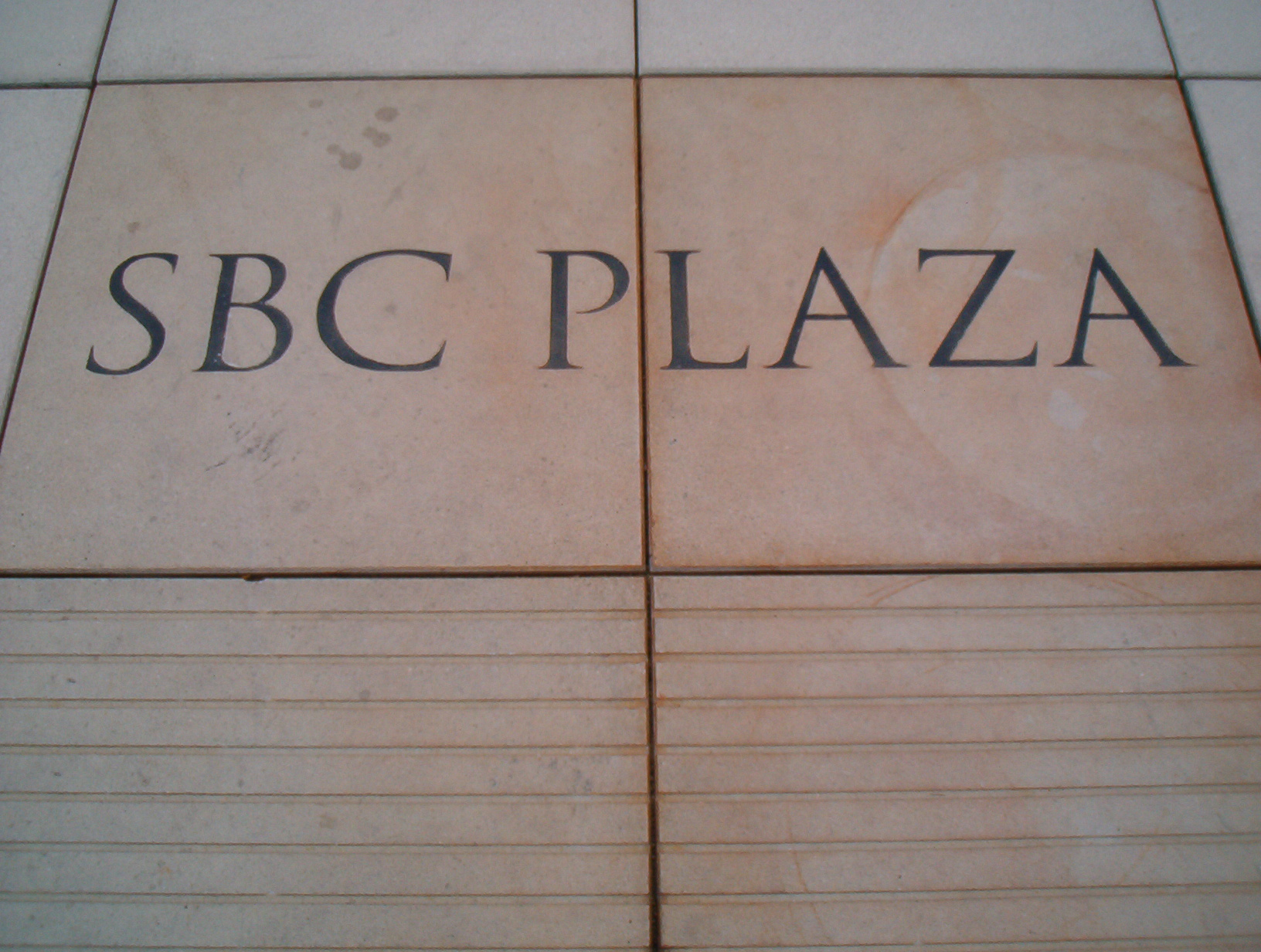
A corporate underwriter's stone marker. (SBC Plaza is now Grainger Plaza.)

Concerns have also been raised over the mixed use of taxpayer and corporate funding and associated naming rights for sections of the park. While a monument in Wrigley Square honors the park's many private and corporate donors, many park features are also named for their corporate underwriters, with the sponsors' names prominently indicated with stone markers (The Boeing Gallery, The Exelon Pavilion, The Grainger Plaza, The Wrigley Square). Some critics have deemed this to be inappropriate for a public space. Julie Deardorff, Chicago Tribune health and fitness reporter, described the naming of the McDonald's Cycle Center as a continuation of the " 'McDonaldization' of America" and as somewhat "insidious" because the company is making itself more prominent as the social sentiment is to move away from fast food. Timothy Gilfoyle, author of Millennium Park: Creating a Chicago Landmark, notes that a controversy surrounds the corporate naming of several of the park's features, including the BP Bridge, named for an oil company. In his analysis, Gilfoyle emphasizes the deeper tensions embedded in the park's development, arguing that Millennium Park was “contested terrain, where civic ideals, corporate interests, and cultural representation collide.” Naming rights were sold for high fees, and Gilfoyle was not the only one who chastised park officials for selling naming rights to the highest bidder. Public interest groups have crusaded against commercialization of parks. However, many of the donors have a long history of local philanthropy and their funds were essential to provide necessary financing for several park features.

Ticket prices for both the Harris Theater and the Pritzker Pavilion have been controversial. John von Rhein, classical music critic for the Chicago Tribune, notes that the theater's size poses a challenge to performers attempting to fill its seats, and feels that it overemphasizes high-priced events. In 2009–2010, the theater introduced two discounted ticket programs: a $5 lunchtime series of 45-minute dance performances, and a $10 ticket program for in-person, cash-only purchases in the last 90 minutes before performances. Once the pavilion was built, the initial plan was that the lawn seating would be free for all events. An early brochure for the Grant Park Music Festival said "You never need a ticket to attend a concert! The lawn and the general seating section are always admission free." However, when parking garage revenue fell short of estimates during the first year, the city charged $10 for lawn seating at the August 31, 2005, concert by Tori Amos. Amos, a classically trained musician who chose only piano and organ accompaniment for her concert, earned positive reviews as the inaugural rock and roll performer in a venue that regularly hosts classical music. The city justified the charge by contending that since the pavilion is an open-air venue, there were many places in Millennium Park where people could have enjoyed the music or the atmosphere of the park without having to pay.

=== Use restrictions ===
When Millennium Park first opened in 2004 Metra Police stopped a Columbia College Chicago journalism student working on a photography project, and confiscated his film because of fears of terrorism. In 2005, Cloud Gate attracted some controversy when a professional photographer without a paid permit was denied access to the piece. As is the case for all works of art currently covered by United States copyright law, the artist holds the copyright for the sculpture. The public may freely photograph Cloud Gate, but permission from Kapoor or the City of Chicago (which has licensed the art) is required for any commercial reproductions of the photographs. Initially the city charged photographers permit fees of $350 per day for professional still photographers, $1,200 per day for professional videographers and $50 per hour for wedding photographers. The policy has been changed so permits are only required for large-scale film, video and photography requiring 10-person crews.

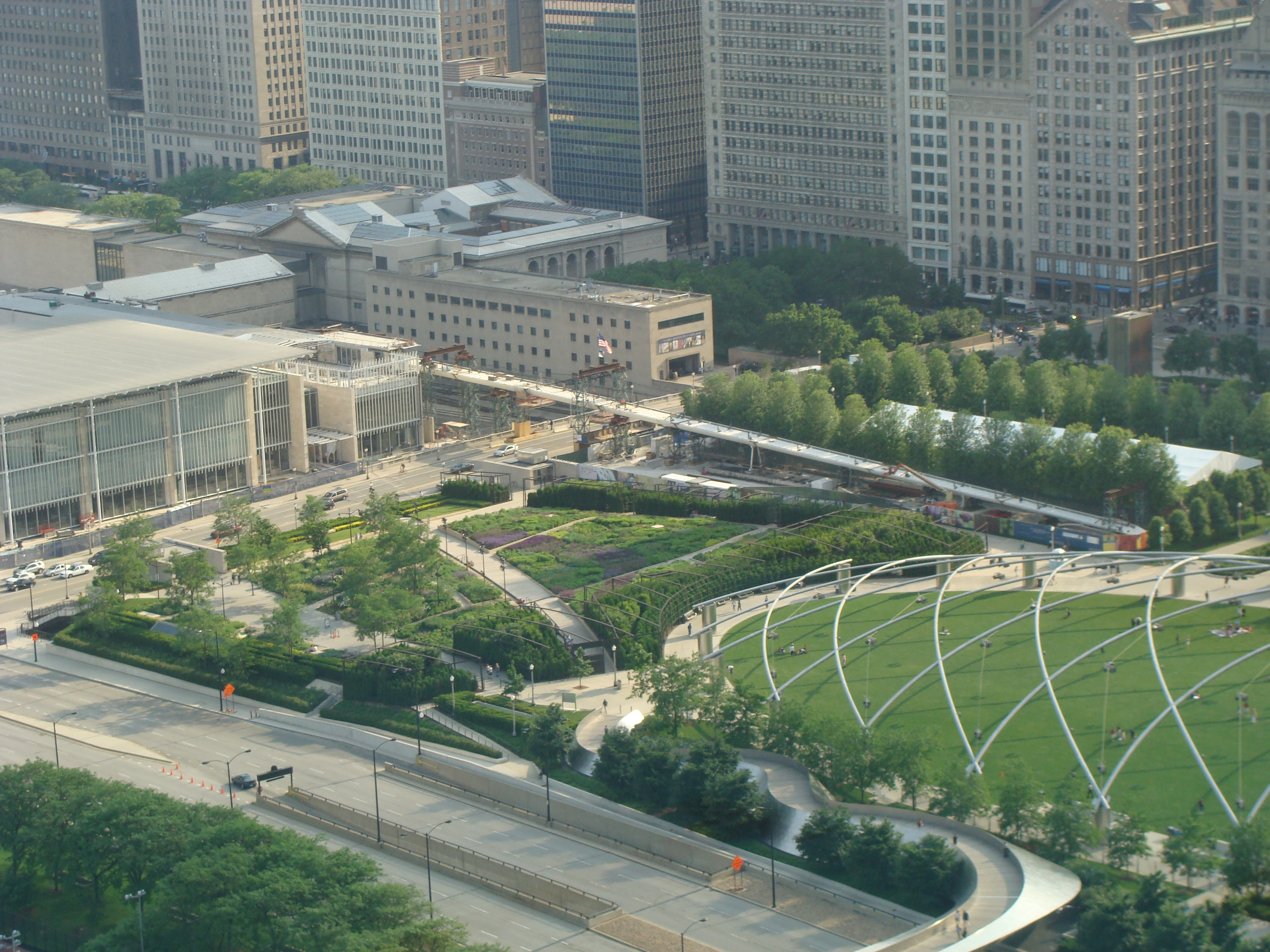
Lurie Garden and the Jay Pritzker Pavilion have both been rented for private events.

Almost all of Millennium Park was closed for a day for corporate events in 2005 and 2006. Closing a public park partly paid for with taxpayer money was controversial, as was the exclusion of commuters who walk through the park and tourists lured by its attractions. On September 8, 2005, Toyota Motor Sales USA paid $800,000 to rent all park venues from 6 a.m. to 11 p.m, except Wrigley Square, the Lurie Garden, the McDonald's Cycle Center and the Crown Fountain. The city said the money was used to fund day-to-day operations, and for free events in the park, including the Lurie Garden Festival, a Steppenwolf Theater production, musical performers along the Chase Promenade all summer long, a jazz series, and children's concerts. The name of Toyota, one of the sponsors, was included on Millennium Park brochures, web site, and advertising signage. The closure provided a public relations opportunity for General Motors, which shuttled 1,500 tourists from the park to see other Chicago attractions. Toyota said it considered $300,000 a rental expense and $500,000 a sponsoring donation. On August 7, 2006, Allstate, which paid $200,000 as a rental expense and $500,000 as a sponsoring donation, acquired the visitation rights to a different set of park features (including Lurie Garden), and only had exclusive access to certain features after 4 p.m.

The park is closed from 11 p.m. to 6 a.m. daily. Chicago is a dog-friendly city with a half dozen dog beaches, however the city does not permit dogs in the park. Only on-duty service dogs for the disabled or visually impaired are permitted.

=== Surveillance cameras ===
In November 2006, the Crown Fountain became the focus of a public controversy when the city added surveillance cameras atop each tower. Purchased with a $52 million Department of Homeland Security grant, the cameras augmented eight others covering all of Millennium Park. City officials had consulted the architects who collaborated with Plensa on the tower designs, but not Plensa himself. Public reaction was negative, as bloggers and the artistic community decried the cameras as inappropriate and a blight on the towers. The city said that the cameras would be replaced with permanent, less intrusive models in several months; it contended that the cameras, similar to those used throughout Chicago in high-crime areas and at traffic intersections, had been added largely for security reasons but also partly to help park officials monitor burnt-out LED lights on the fountain. The Chicago Tribune published an article on the cameras and the public reaction; the cameras were removed the next day, with Plensa's support.

== Reception and recognition ==
The Financial Times describes Millennium Park as "an extraordinary public park that is set to create new iconic images of the city", and further notes that it is "a genuinely 21st-century interactive park [that] could trigger a new way of thinking about public outdoor spaces". Time magazine views both Cloud Gate and the Jay Pritzker Pavilion as part of a well-planned visit to Chicago. Frommer's lists exploring Millennium Park as one of the four best free things to do in the city, and it commends the park for its various artistic offerings. Lonely Planet recommends an hour-long stroll to see the park's playful art. The park is praised as a "showcase of art and urban design" by the San Francisco Chronicle, while Time refers to it as an "artfully re-arranged ... civic phantasmagoria like Antonio Gaudí's Park Güell in Barcelona, with the difference that this one is the product of an ensemble of creative spirits". The book 1,000 Places to See in the U.S.A. & Canada Before You Die describes Millennium Park as a renowned attraction.

This is not simply a background park, where a series of individual objects exist in a field. The objects here have become the field. It is densely packed like the city itself. This is a different idea of an exterior experience than in most parks. It is closer to a theme park or a shopping mall.

— Richard Solomon, Director of Graham Foundation for Advanced Studies in the Fine Arts

The park was designed to be accessible; it only needs a single wheelchair lift and its accessibility won its project director the 2005 Barrier-Free America Award. The McCormick Tribune Plaza & Ice Rink and the Jay Pritzker Pavilion both provide accessible restrooms. The park opened with 78 women's toilet fixtures and 45 for men, with heated facilities on the east side of the Pritzker Pavilion. It also had about six dozen park benches designed by GGN (Gustafson Guthrie Nichol), the landscape architect responsible for the Lurie Garden. In 2005, the park won the Green Roof Award of Excellence in the Intensive Industrial/Commercial category from Green Roofs for Healthy Cities (GRHC). GRHC considers the park to be one of the largest green roofs in the world; it covers "a structural deck supported by two reinforced concrete cast-in-place garages and steel structures that span over the remaining railroad tracks". In 2005 the park also received Travel + Leisure's Design Award for "Best Public Space", and the American Public Works Association's "Project of the Year" Award. In its first year, the park, its features and associated people received over 30 awards.

Some mayors from other cities have admired the park as an example of successful urban planning. The mayor of Shanghai enjoyed his visit to the park, and San Francisco Mayor Gavin Newsom wished his city could create a similar type of civic amenity. Closer to home, Blair Kamin, the Pulitzer Prize-winning architecture critic for the Chicago Tribune, concluded his 2004 review of Millennium Park with the following: "...a park provides a respite from the city, yet it also reflects the city. In that sense, all of Millennium Park mirrors the rebirth of Chicago ... the ambition of its patrons, the creativity of its artists and architects, and the ongoing miracle of its ability to transform a no place into a someplace that's extraordinary." In 2009, Millennium Park won the Rudy Bruner Award for Urban Excellence silver medal.

In celebration of the 2018 Illinois Bicentennial, Millennium Park was selected as one of the Illinois 200 Great Places by the American Institute of Architects Illinois component (AIA Illinois) and was recognized by USA Today Travel magazine, as one of AIA Illinois' selections for Illinois 25 Must See Places.

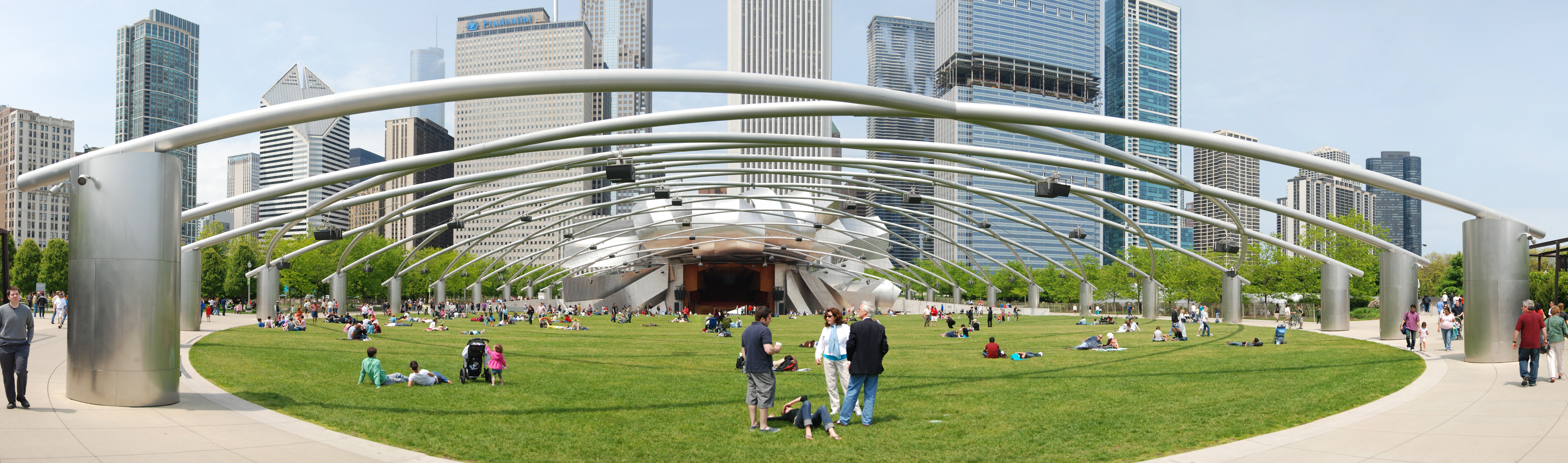
This panoramic view of the Great Lawn, trellis, and bandshell at Jay Pritzker Pavilion was taken in May 2009. Among the buildings pictured in the background are (left to right) The Heritage, Smurfit-Stone Building, Trump International Hotel and Tower, One Prudential Plaza, Two Prudential Plaza, Aon Center, Aqua, Blue Cross Blue Shield Tower, 340 on the Park, The Buckingham, 400 East Randolph, and Harbor Point.

== See also ==
- Architecture of Chicago
- List of concert halls
- List of contemporary amphitheatres
- Park conservancy
