= Social polling =

Social polling is a form of open access polling, which combines social media and opinion polling. In contrast to tradition polling the polls are formulated by the respondents themselves.

Social polling is an example of nonprobability sampling that uses self-selection rather than a statistical sampling scheme. Social polling also allows quick feedback since responses are obtained via social media platforms such as Facebook, Twitter, and blogs. A sentiment analytics tool can be employed to monitor the poll or the topics of discussion. This method can evaluate information obtained via social media posts through two paradigms: "top down" and "bottom up".

== See also ==
- Snowball sampling
