= Urtak =

Former Public Opinion Website

- Website type: Polling, Public Opinion Research
- Available in: English
- Website: urtak.com
- Launched: 2008

Urtak was a free collaborative public opinion website founded in 2008 based in New York City. An urtak survey could be created by any individual for his or her community. The users of an urtak survey can add questions of their own to the survey, as well as answer questions that have been asked by other users. As soon as a question is answered, previous responses to the question by other users were immediately displayed in the form of a pie chart, and users were also able to search for and browse the results of previously answered questions. All questions were fed randomly to participants and have only three options for answering: "yes," "no," and "don't care."

The first urtak to have been created was titled "The General Interest Urtak". Since Urtak was founded in 2008, over 13,000 Urtak surveys have been created, more than 77,000 questions have been asked, and over 22 million responses have been recorded.

On September 16, 2013 Urtak announced the service would be suspended commencing September 20, 2013.
