= Exelon Pavilions =

Four buildings in Chicago, Illinois, US

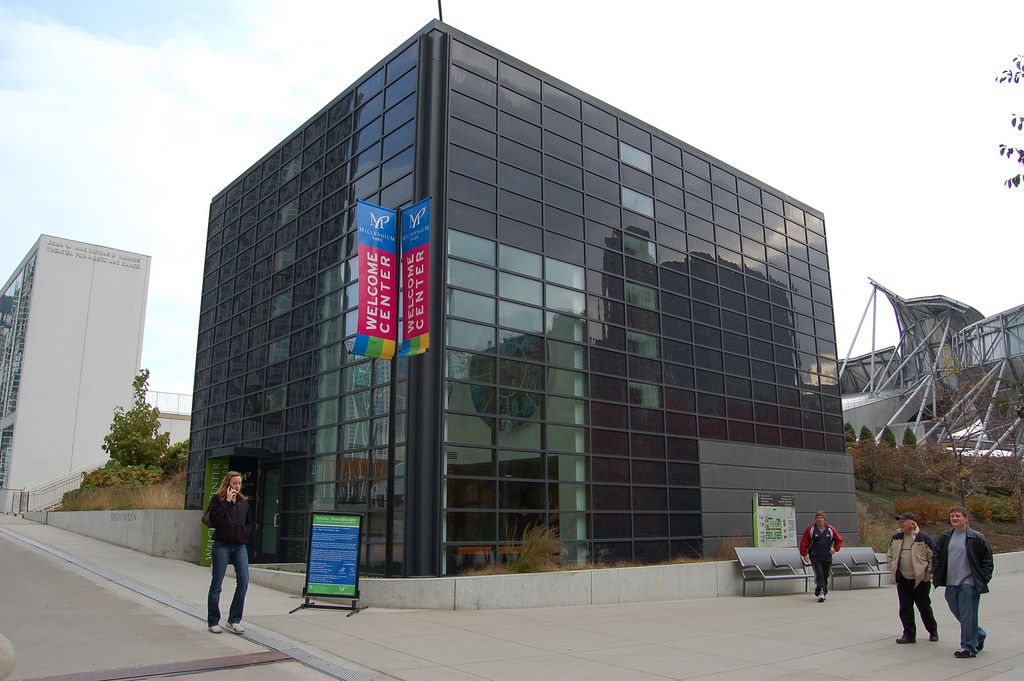
- The Northwest Exelon Pavilion is the Millennium Park Welcome Center and houses the park's office.

- Location of the North and South Exelon Pavilions

General information
- Type: Municipal
- Architectural style: Modern
- Location: 151 and 201 E. Randolph St. (North); Monroe St. (South); Millennium Park, Chicago, Illinois; United States
- Coordinates: 41°53′2.67″N 87°37′20.54″W
- Current tenants: Millennium Park Welcome Center (NW); Chicago Shop at Millennium Park (NE); Parking garage access (NE, SE, SW)
- Construction started: January 2004
- Completed: July 2004 (South); November 2004 (North) (April 30, 2005 opening)
- Owner: City of Chicago

Technical details
- Floor count: three (NW), two (NE), one (SW, SE)

Design and construction
- Architects: Thomas H. Beeby (North); Renzo Piano (South)
- Engineer: Environmental Systems Design, Inc. (North)
- Structural engineer: Thorton Tomasetti Engineers (North)
- Main contractor: Walsh Construction

The Exelon Pavilions are four buildings that generate electricity from solar energy and provide access to underground parking in Millennium Park in the Loop community area of Chicago in Cook County, Illinois, United States. The Northeast Exelon Pavilion and Northwest Exelon Pavilion (jointly the North Exelon Pavilions) are located on the northern edge of the park along Randolph Street, and flank the Harris Theater. The Southeast Exelon Pavilion and Southwest Exelon Pavilion (jointly the South Exelon Pavilions) are located on the southern edge of the park along Monroe Street, and flank the Lurie Garden. Together the pavilions generate 19,840 kilowatt-hours (71,400 MJ) of electricity annually, worth about $2,350 per year.

The four pavilions, which cost $7 million, were designed in January 2001; construction began in January 2004. The South Pavilions were completed and opened in July 2004, while the North Pavilions were completed in November 2004, with a grand opening on April 30, 2005. In addition to producing energy, three of the four pavilions provide access to the parking garages below the park, while the fourth serves as the park's welcome center and office. Exelon, a company that generates the electricity transmitted by its subsidiary Commonwealth Edison, donated $5.5 million for the pavilions. Chicago Tribune architecture critic Blair Kamin praised the South Pavilions as "minor modernist jewels", but criticized the North Pavilions as "nearly all black and impenetrable". The North Pavilions have received the Leadership in Energy and Environmental Design (LEED) silver rating from the United States Green Building Council, as well as an award from the American Society of Heating, Refrigerating and Air-Conditioning Engineers (ASHRAE).

== Background ==
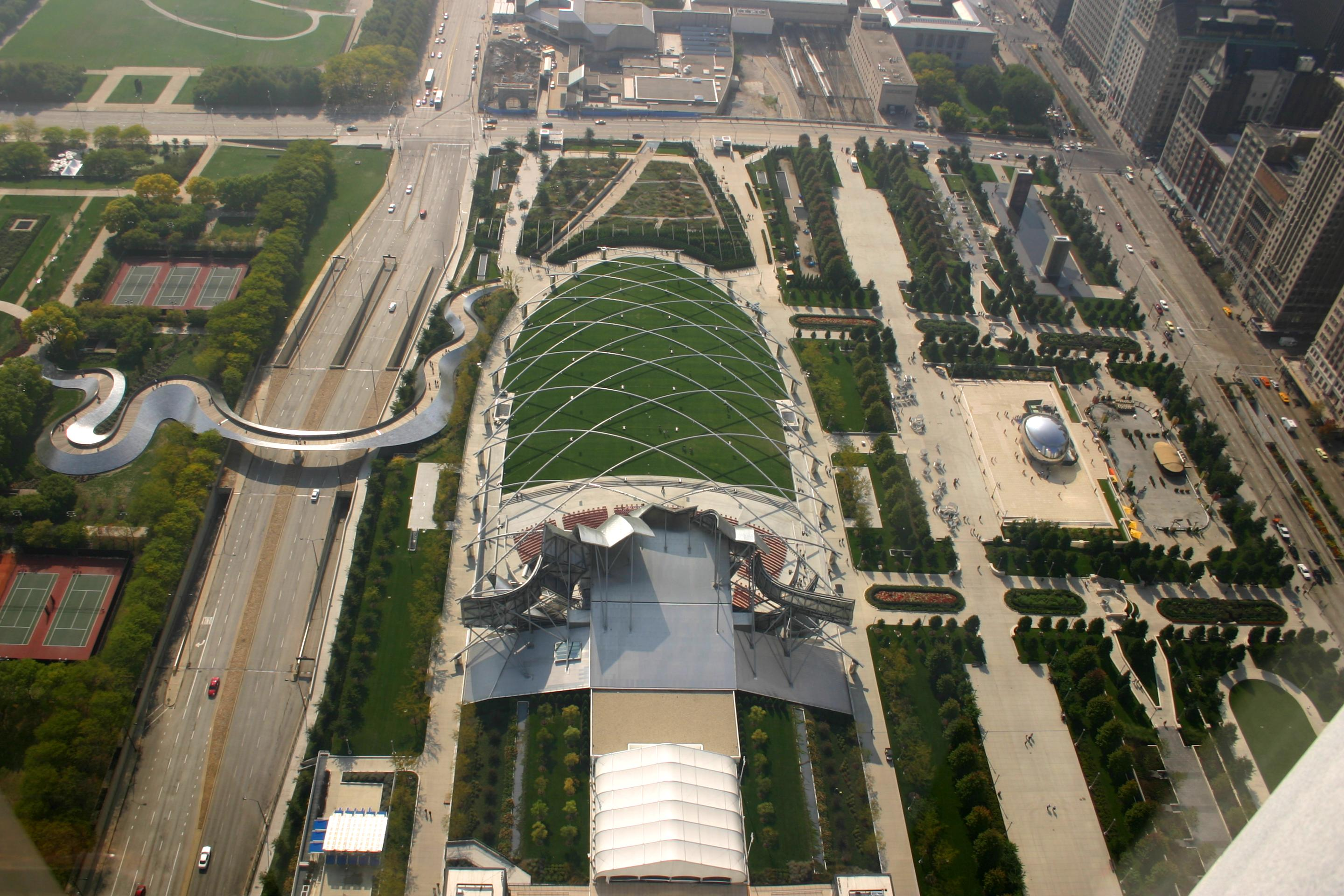
Aerial view of Millennium Park in 2005; north is at the bottom

Lying between Lake Michigan to the east and the Loop to the west, Grant Park has been Chicago's front yard since the mid-19th century. Its northwest corner, north of Monroe Street and the Art Institute, east of Michigan Avenue, south of Randolph Street, and west of Columbus Drive, had been Illinois Central rail yards and parking lots until 1997, when it was made available for development by the city as Millennium Park. As of 2009, Millennium Park trailed only Navy Pier as a Chicago tourist attraction.

In 1836, a year before Chicago was incorporated, the Board of Canal Commissioners held public auctions for the city's first lots. Citizens with the foresight to keep the lakefront as public open space convinced the commissioners to designate the land east of Michigan Avenue between Randolph Street and Park Row (11th Street) "Public Ground—A Common to Remain Forever Open, Clear and Free of Any Buildings, or Other Obstruction, whatever." Grant Park has been "forever open, clear and free" since, protected by legislation that has been affirmed by four previous Illinois Supreme Court rulings. In 1839, United States Secretary of War Joel Roberts Poinsett decommissioned the Fort Dearborn reserve and declared the land between Randolph Street and Madison Street east of Michigan Avenue "Public Ground forever to remain vacant of buildings".

Aaron Montgomery Ward, who is known both as the inventor of mail order and the protector of Grant Park, twice sued the city of Chicago to force it to remove buildings and structures from Grant Park, and to keep it from building new ones. In 1890, arguing that Michigan Avenue property owners held easements on the park land, Ward commenced legal actions to keep the park free of new buildings. In 1900, the Illinois Supreme Court concluded that all landfill east of Michigan Avenue was subject to dedications and easements. In 1909, when he sought to prevent the construction of the Field Museum of Natural History in the center of the park, the courts affirmed his arguments and the museum was built elsewhere.

As a result, the city has what are termed the Montgomery Ward height restrictions on buildings and structures in Grant Park; structures over 40 feet (12 m) tall are not allowed in the park, with the exception of bandshells. However, within Millennium Park, the 50-foot (15 m) Crown Fountain and the 139-foot (42 m) Jay Pritzker Pavilion were exempt from the height restrictions, because they were classified as works of art and not buildings or structures. Shorter structures do not run afoul of the height restrictions. The Harris Theater, which lies between the North Pavilions, was built mostly underground to avoid the restrictions. The Northwest Pavilion, tallest of the four, is three stories high; the Northeast Pavilion is two stories, and the South Pavilions are each one story.

== Design and construction ==
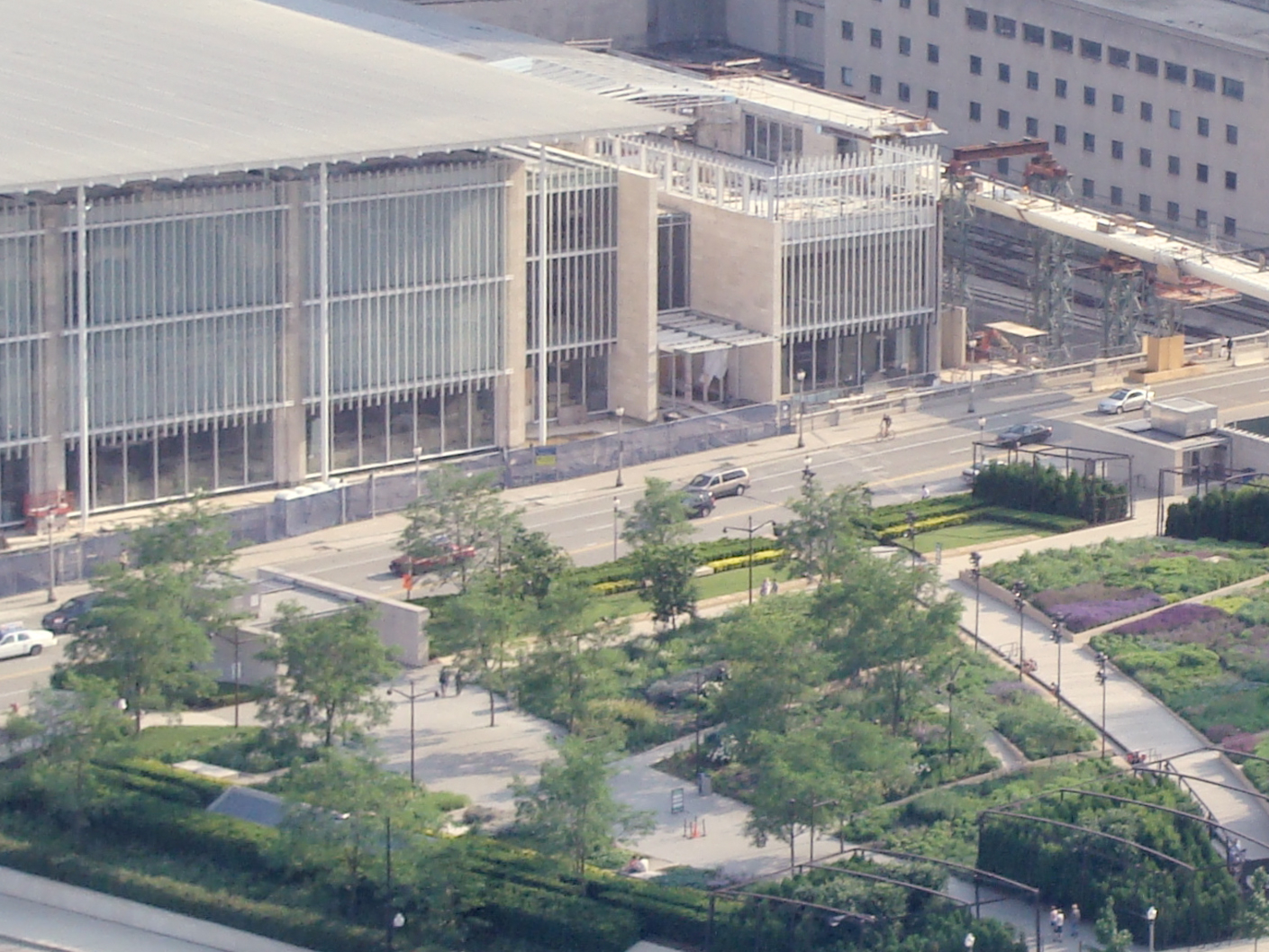
Renzo Piano designed the South Exelon Pavilions (the two structures on the near side of the street in Lurie Garden), the Art Institute's 2009 Modern Wing, and the Nichols Bridgeway.

The pavilions are named for Exelon, a Chicago-based company that generates the electricity transmitted by its subsidiary Commonwealth Edison (ComEd). The city of Chicago has collaborated with Exelon and ComEd on a variety of environmental projects, including the installation of solar power in buildings, support for sustainable design and renewable energy, and furthering educational and social awareness of green architecture in the city. The pavilions cost $7 million, $5.5 million of which was donated by Exelon and ComEd.

The lead designer for the North Pavilions was Thomas H. Beeby of Hammond Beeby Rupert Ainge Architects. Beeby's designs for the North Pavilions are "in harmony with the Harris Theater", for which he was the architect as well. The North Pavilions are along Randolph Street on either side of the theater, which is Millennium Park's indoor performing-arts venue.

The South Pavilions were designed by architect Renzo Piano of Renzo Piano Building Workshop. Piano designed the Art Institute of Chicago's Modern Wing, which is across Monroe Street from the South Pavilions and opened in 2009. The facades of the South Pavilions are limestone and glass in order to complement the Modern Wing, even though it was not completed until several years after the pavilions were finished. Piano also designed the Nichols Bridgeway, which connects Millennium Park and the Art Institute, and is next to the Southwest Pavilion.

The design process for the Exelon Pavilions began in September 2001, with construction starting in January 2004. The general contractor for all four pavilions was Walsh Construction. The South Pavilions were completed in July 2004 and opened when Millennium Park celebrated its grand opening on July 16, 2004. The North Pavilions were not finished in July 2004, but were completed in November of that year. All four Exelon Pavilions were officially opened to the public on April 30, 2005.

== Structures ==
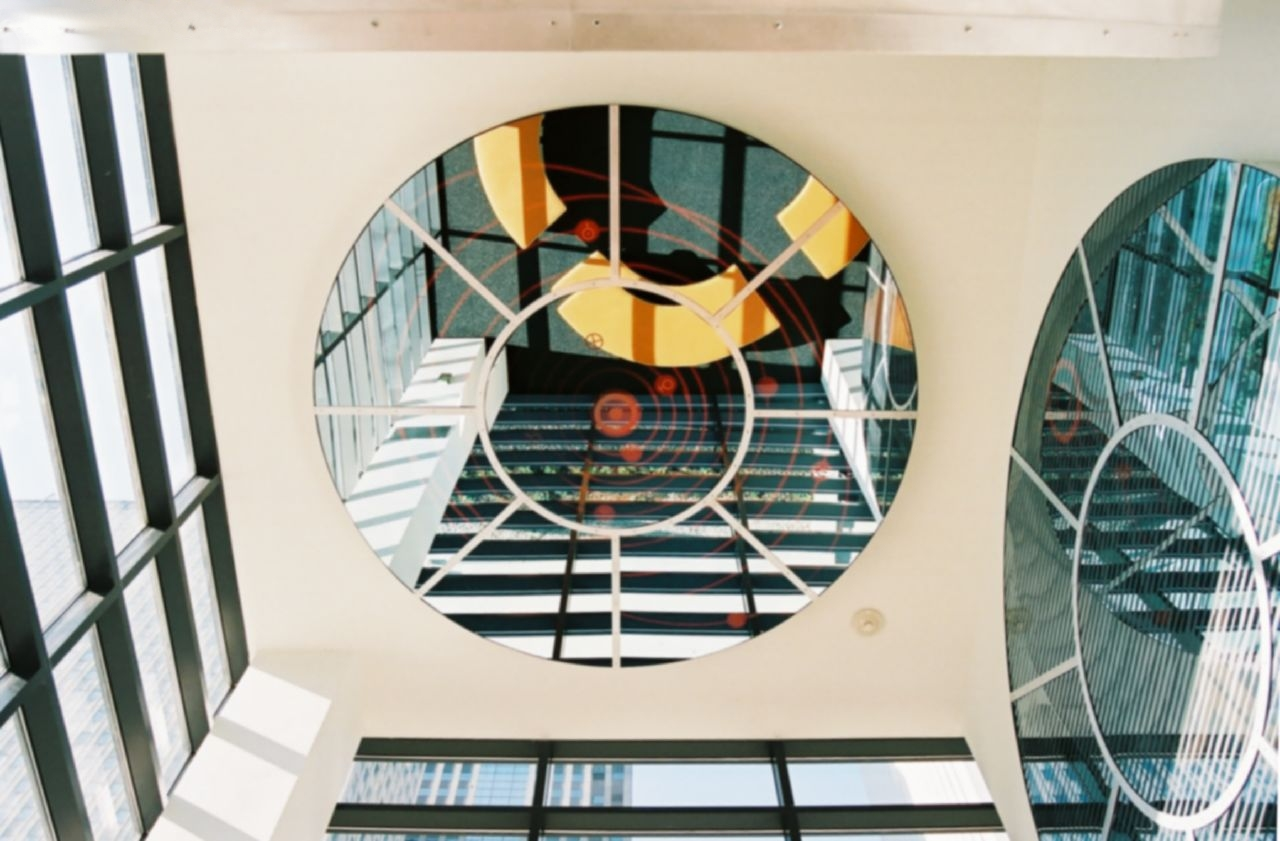
Ceiling inside the Northwest Exelon Pavilion

The North Pavilions were designed as minimalist black cubes, and together are capable of producing 16,000 kilowatt-hours (58,000 MJ) of electricity annually. The outermost layer of the exterior of each pavilion is a curtain wall made of recycled aluminum. These walls contain specially designed "mono-crystalline photovoltaic modules and insulated glass". Convection from radiant solar heat gain causes air to cycle within air cavities covered by the photovoltaic modules. A "highly heat-reflective thermoplastic membrane" is used to waterproof each roof, and helps mitigate the urban heat island effect.

The photovoltaic modules generate electricity to power much of the pavilions' lighting. The North Pavilions are the first Chicago buildings to use building integrated photovoltaic cells, which are a solar energy system incorporated into the building's structural elements. Millennium Park's planners claimed that the pavilions had the first electricity-generating curtain walls in the Midwest.

=== Northwest Pavilion ===
The Northwest Pavilion, located at 151 E. Randolph Street, houses the Millennium Park Welcome Center and an Exelon energy display. It contains the Millennium Park offices, and public restrooms. The three-story Northwest Pavilion is the largest of the four pavilions, with 6,100 square feet (570 m^{2}), and is the only pavilion that does not provide access to the parking garage below. The Northwest Pavilion has 460 photovoltaic modules to harness solar energy, houses recycling facilities, and its "interior finishes and construction materials are derived from renewable resources".

The Millennium Park Welcome Center in the Northwest Pavilion offers guides to the park and wheelchairs. It houses exhibitions on parks and energy, and has interactive displays on how the pavilions' solar panels function and on renewable energy. There are exhibits with interactive web-based touch screens that depict the city's use of solar energy, and a dynamic multi-screen video presentation on electricity generation and usage. The building's atrium includes a sculpture by Chicago-based artists Patrick McGee and Adelheid Mers with three backlit 9-foot (2.7 m) two-way mirrors. The sculpture, titled Heliosphere, Biosphere, Technosphere, is "designed to interpret the links between the Earth's atmosphere, the solar system and scientific applications". It is the only permanent work of art by Chicago artists within the park.

=== Northeast Pavilion ===
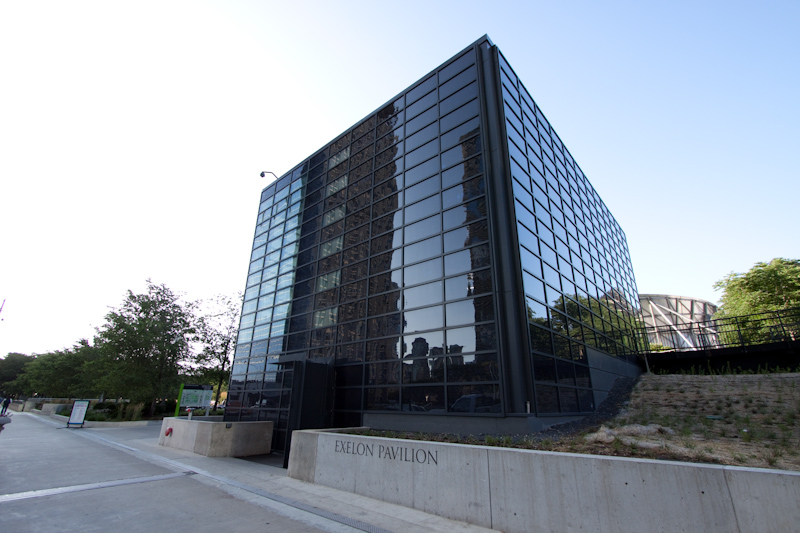
The Northeast Exelon Pavilion has an entrance to the garage below and a shop.

The Northeast Pavilion houses a pedestrian entrance to the Millennium Park parking garage, and provides access to the Harris Theater's rooftop terrace. It is at 201 E. Randolph Street, east of the theater and west of the McDonald's Cycle Center. The pavilion's second floor has the Chicago Shop, which offers a self-guided Millennium Park audio tour for rental and sells official Millennium Park and Chicago souvenirs. The two-story Northeast Pavilion is the second-largest, with 4,100 square feet (380 m^{2}) of surface area, and also has 460 photovoltaic modules to generate electricity from sunlight.

=== South Pavilions ===
The south pavilions are east and west of the Lurie Garden along Monroe Street, and their glass walls allow views of the garden. Both of the South Pavilions provide access to the parking garage below the park. The 550-square-foot (51 m^{2}) Southwest Pavilion is the smallest of the four pavilions, and has the fewest photovoltaic modules with 16 on its roof. It is west of the garden and east of the Nichols Bridgeway. The Southeast Pavilion is east of the garden, has the second smallest area at 750 square feet (70 m^{2}), and has 24 rooftop photovoltaic modules. Together these two pavilions are capable of producing 3,840 kilowatt-hours (13,800 MJ) of electricity annually.

== Reception and recognition ==
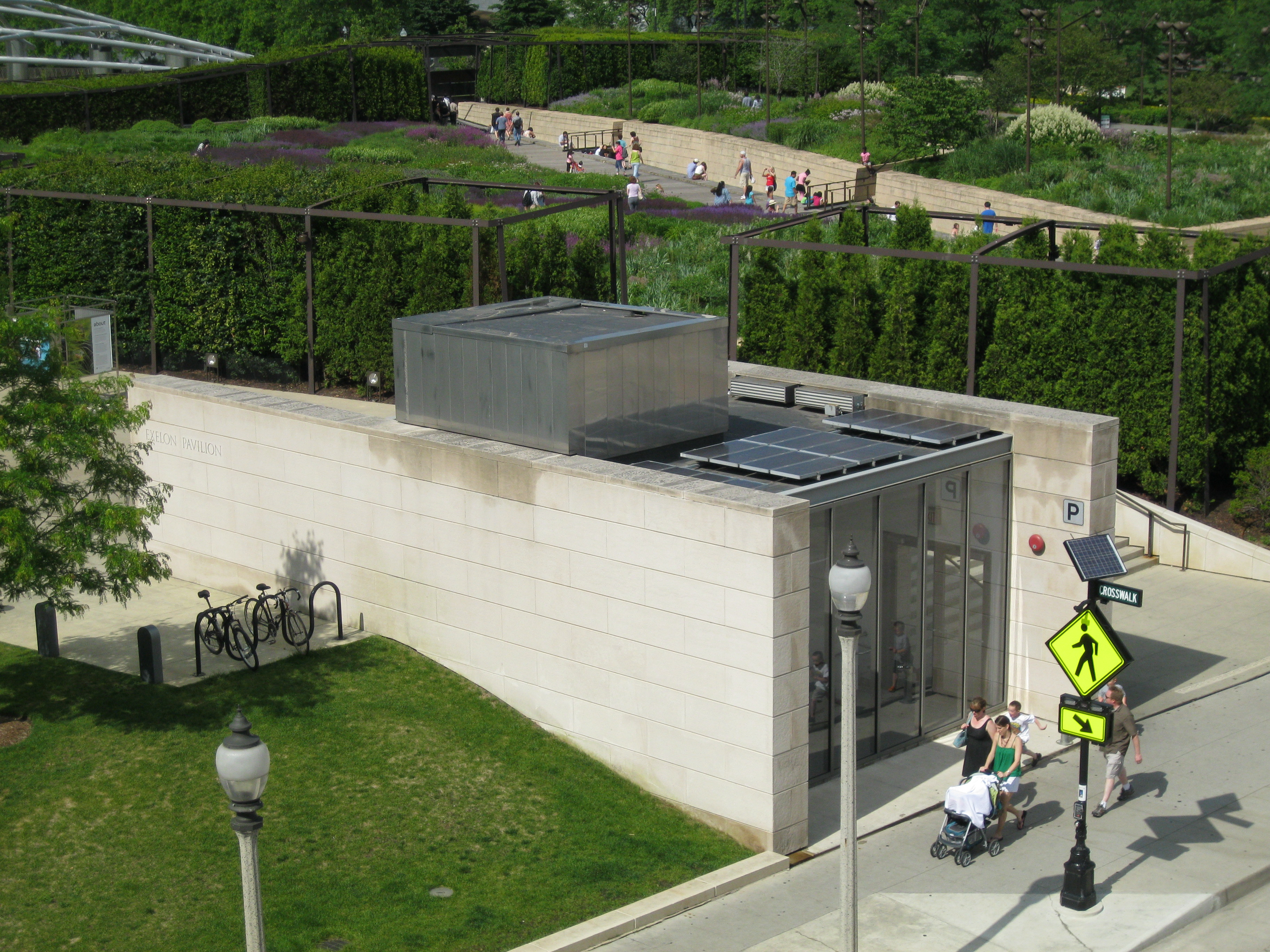
Blair Kamin described the Southwest (pictured) and Southeast Exelon Pavilions as "minor modernist jewels, almost house-like".

Pulitzer Prize-winning Chicago Tribune architecture critic Blair Kamin praised the decision to have architects design the pavilions as an "inspired stroke", speculating that if their designs had been left to contractors, visitors to Millennium Park could have instead seen unimpressive "blunt utilitarian huts". Kamin was pleased with Piano's South Pavilions, describing them as "minor modernist jewels, almost house-like". He lauded the way their limestone walls complement the transparent glass by way of contrast, and noted that they anticipated Piano's then-forthcoming addition to the Art Institute of Chicago Building. Kamin gave the South Pavilions a rating of three stars out of a possible four, or "very good".

Kamin was less pleased with Beeby's North Pavilions, which he described as "nearly all black and impenetrable" and compared to Darth Vader's helmet. He acknowledged the pavilions' innovative technology, and their "urban design function" as wings for the Harris Theater, which Kamin felt "allows the theater to better stand up to the Frank Gehry-designed Pritzker Pavilion to its south". Because they were not finished when he wrote his review in July 2004, Kamin did not give the North Pavilions an overall star rating; he did express the hope that they would have a more pleasant appearance once completed.

The pavilions have been recognized for their innovative use of renewable energy and green design. In 2005, the North Pavilions received the Leadership in Energy and Environmental Design (LEED) silver rating from the United States Green Building Council. They received a Technology Award Honorable Mention in the category of "Alternative and/or Renewable Energy Use – New Construction" from the American Society of Heating, Refrigerating and Air-Conditioning Engineers (ASHRAE). The United States Department of Energy has recognized all the pavilions as part of its Million Solar Roofs Initiative. In 2005 Chicago ranked fourth among U.S. cities in solar installations; the completion of the Exelon Pavilions took the city to a total of 1 MW of installed photovoltaic systems. The pavilions together generate 19,840 kilowatt-hours (71,400 MJ) of electricity annually, worth $2,353 per year at 2010 average Illinois electricity prices. According to the City of Chicago, this is enough energy to power the equivalent of 14 Energy Star-rated efficient houses in Chicago.

== Image map ==
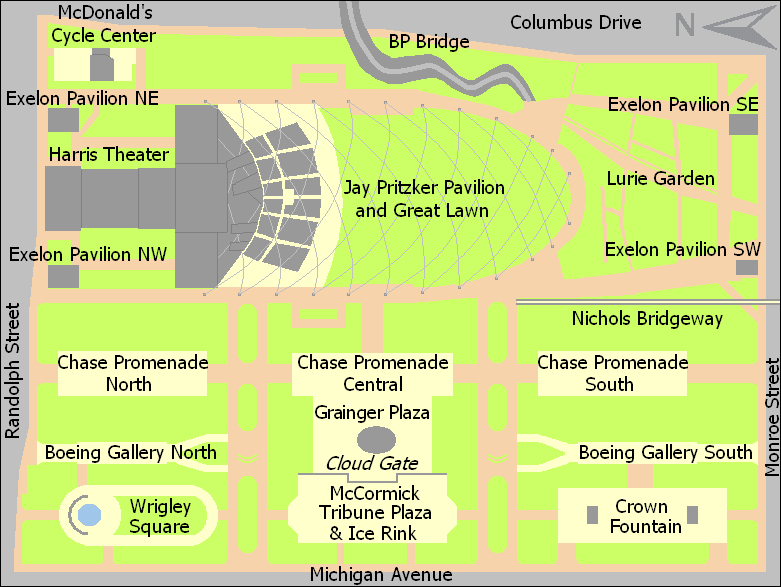
Image map of Millennium Park; east is at the top. Each feature or label is linked.

Northwest Exelon Pavilion 41°53′2.67″N 87°37′20.54″W
Northeast Exelon Pavilion 41°53′2.72″N 87°37′16.90″W
Southwest Exelon Pavilion 41°52′51.70″N 87°37′20.10″W
Southeast Exelon Pavilion 41°52′51.62″N 87°37′17.02″W
