= Nichols Bridgeway =

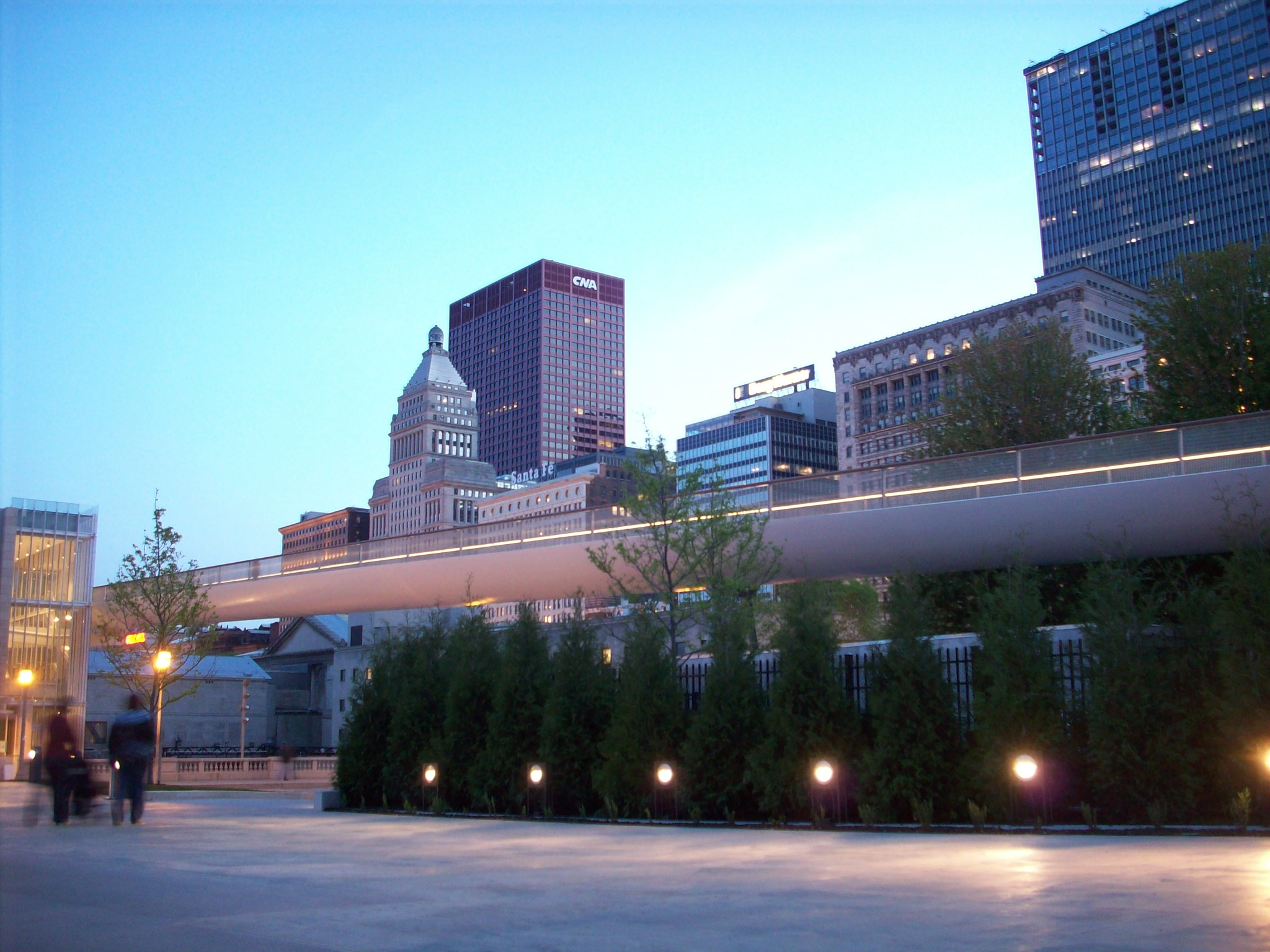
- The Bridgeway after completion in May 2009
- Coordinates: 41°52′50″N 87°37′21″W
- Carries: Pedestrians
- Crosses: Monroe Street
- Locale: Chicago, Illinois

Characteristics
- Total length: 620 feet (189.0 m)
- Width: 15 feet (4.6 m)

History
- Designer: Renzo Piano
- Construction start: September 20, 2007
- Opened: May 16, 2009

Location
- Interactive map of Nichols Bridgeway

The Nichols Bridgeway is a pedestrian bridge located in Chicago, Illinois. The bridge begins at the Great Lawn of Millennium Park, crosses over Monroe Street and connects to the third floor of the West Pavilion of the Modern Wing, the Art Institute of Chicago's newest wing. The bridge opened May 16, 2009.

Designed by Renzo Piano, the architect of the Modern Wing, the bridge is approximately 620 ft (190 m) long and 15 ft (4.6 m) wide. The bottom of the Bridgeway is made of white, painted structural steel, the floor is made of aluminum planking and the 42" tall railings are steel set atop stainless steel mesh. The Bridgeway features anti-slip walkways and heating elements to prevent the formation of ice and meets ADA standards for universal accessibility. The bridge is named after museum donors Alexandra and John Nichols. The bridge design was inspired by the hull of a boat.

== Construction ==
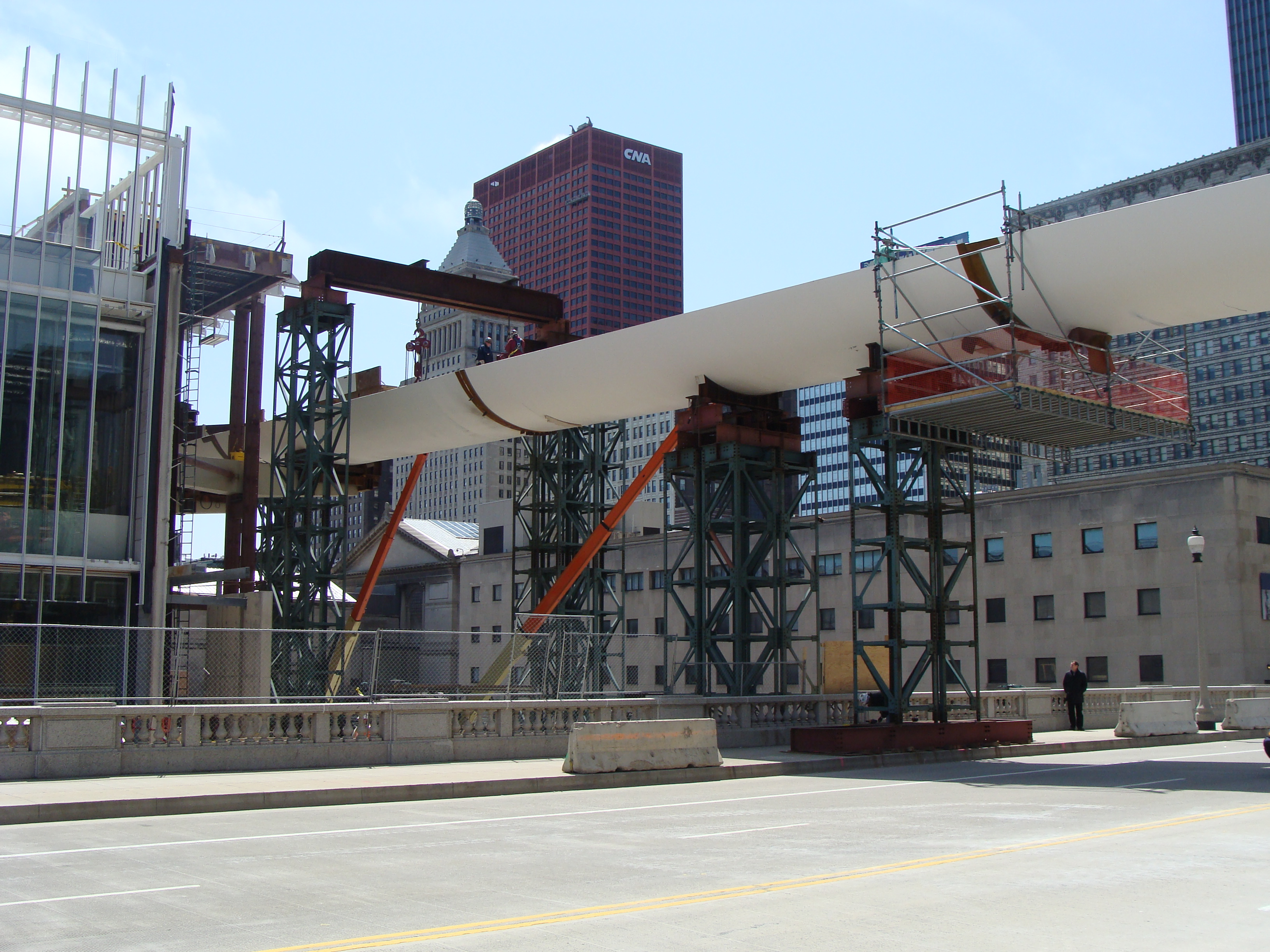
Nichols Bridgeway under construction in May 2008

The Nichols Bridgeway was added to the master plan of the Modern Wing of the Art Institute of Chicago in 2005. Construction on the bridge began on September 20, 2007. Construction was completed on April 8, 2009. The bridge officially opened, along with the Modern Wing on May 16, 2009.

On June 11, 2009, the Structural Engineers Association of Illinois (SEAOI) named the winners of its 2009 excellence in engineering awards. Arup and Wiss, Janney, Elstner Associates, Inc., received an Award of Merit for their design work for the Nichols Bridgeway.

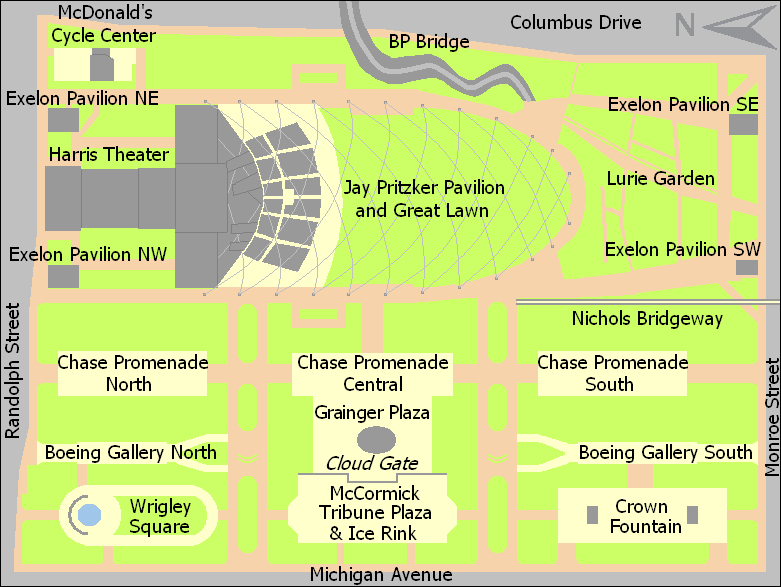
Image map of Millennium Park; east is at the top. Each feature or label is linked.

== Pop culture ==
In the 2012 romantic comedy, The Vow, the characters run from the Art Institute of Chicago across the Bridgeway to Millennium Park, where they kiss under Cloud Gate.
