= AT&T Plaza =

AT&T Plaza may refer to:

- AT&T Plaza (Chicago), a part of Millennium Park, in Chicago, Illinois
- AT&T Plaza (St. Louis) or AT&T Center, a building in St. Louis, Missouri
- One AT&T Plaza or Whitacre Tower, a building in Dallas, Texas
- AT&T Plaza, a part of the American Airlines Center, a sports arena in Dallas, Texas
