= Park Grill =

Restaurant included in the Millennium Park, Chicago

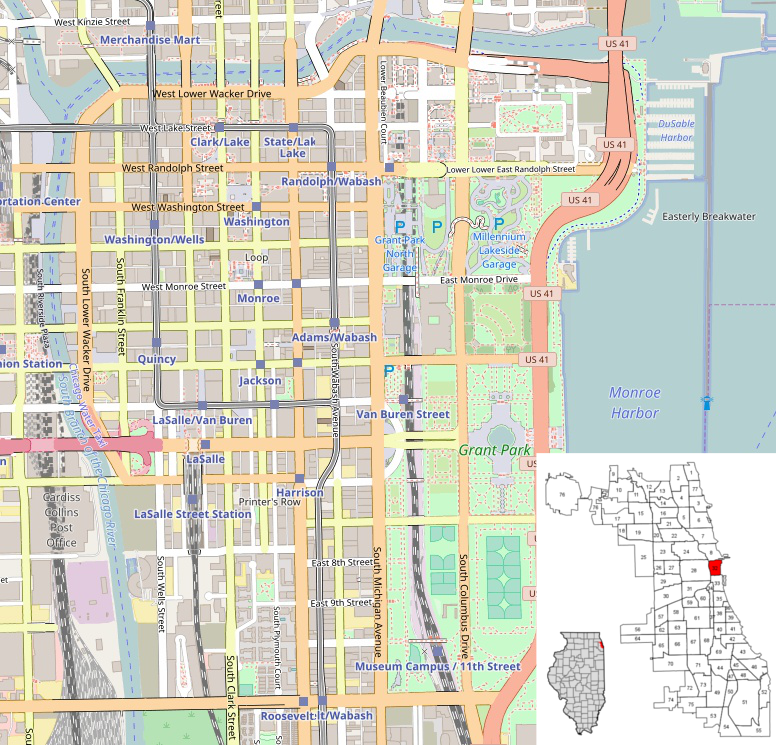
- Location within the Chicago Loop

Restaurant information
- Established: November 24, 2003
- Owner: Syndicate of shareholders
- Chef: Alfredo Sandoval
- Food type: Contemporary American cuisine
- Dress code: Casual
- Location: 11 North Michigan Avenue, Chicago, Illinois, 60602, United States
- Coordinates: 41°52′57″N 87°37′24″W
- Seating capacity: 300
- Reservations: Yes
- Website: Park Grill

The Park Grill is the only full-service restaurant included in Millennium Park in Chicago, Illinois. Its outdoor seating area is the largest al fresco dining area in Chicago. It has placed among the leaders in citywide best-of competitions for best burger and is widely praised for its views.

The exclusive location, the lucrative contract terms, the investor list, and a close personal relationship between a managing partner of the restaurant and the Chicago Park District's project manager led to a formal ethics investigation, court litigation, and extensive press coverage, and ranked among the most prominent scandals of the administration of Chicago Mayor Richard M. Daley in 2005. The more than 80 investors include some of Daley's friends and neighbors. One of the most financially successful restaurants in Chicago, the Park Grill remains exempt from property taxes after a multi-year litigation which reached the Illinois Supreme Court.

== Location and views ==
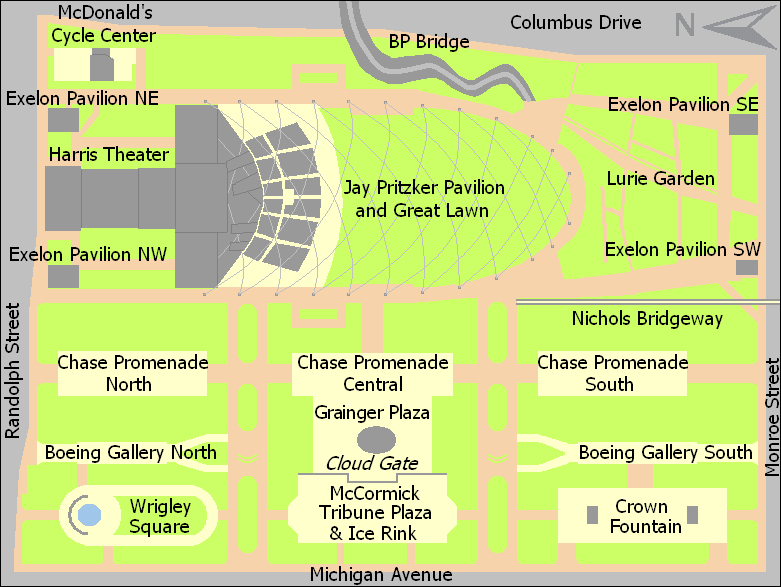
Image map of Millennium Park. Each feature or label is wikilinked. Park Grill is located underneath AT&T Plaza and Cloud Gate. (Base image and authors are available here.)

The Park Grill is located on North Michigan Avenue in Chicago in the Historic Michigan Boulevard District. Cloud Gate, a public sculpture, is located on AT&T Plaza on the roof of the Park Grill.

During the summer months, the restaurant's outdoor seating area becomes the largest al fresco dining area in Chicago. During the winter months, the restaurant's outdoor seating area becomes the McCormick Tribune Plaza & Ice Rink, and diners in the 300-seat The Park Grill overlooks the ice skating rink through floor-to-ceiling windows.

== History ==
In late 2001, Matthew A. O'Malley and James Horan proposed Park Grill and Park Cafe to "provide both white-tablecloth meals and picnic-hamper fare for visitors in Millennium Park". In 2003, the Chicago Park District awarded a 20-year contract to run the Park Grill to a partnership, including several of Mayor Richard M. Daley's friends and neighbors.

=== Background of managing partners ===
The current managing partners of the Park Grill are O'Malley and Horan. O'Malley, who once worked for the U.S. Representative Dan Rostenkowski, runs the re-purposed firehouse, Chicago Firehouse Restaurant, which is located around the corner from the home of Mayor Richard M. Daley, who has been a steady customer. The son of Alderman Edward Vrdolyak has also been a business partner with O'Malley. Matthew O'Malley and his brother Paul were picked to run the Clock Tower Cafe at the Sydney Marovitz Golf Course in Lincoln Park on the Chicago lakefront. James Horan is a restaurant owner and caterer. He is president of Blue Plate Catering, which runs a cafe at Gallery 37, an after-school program created and fostered by Mayor Daley's wife, Maggie Daley.

=== Background of investors ===
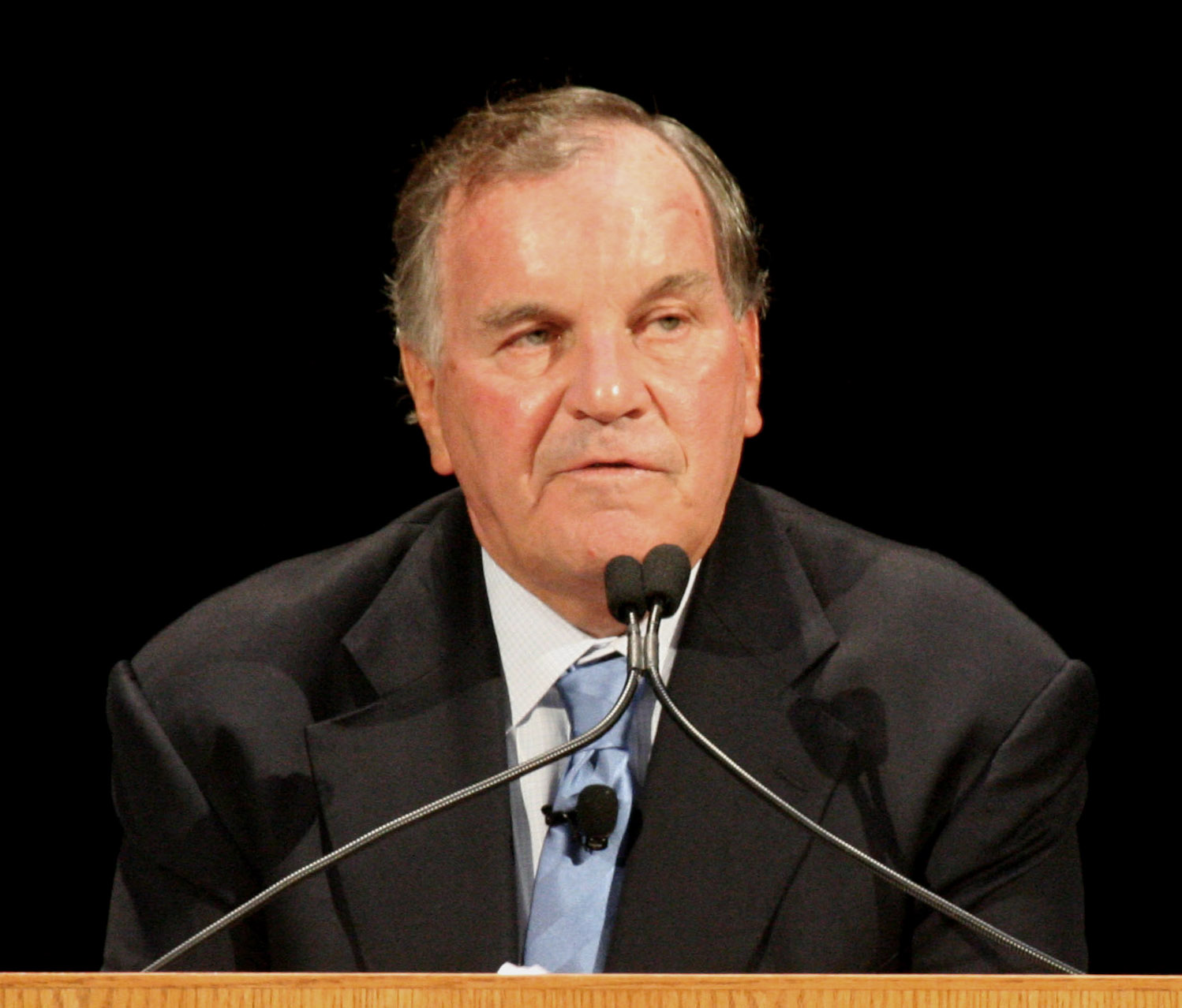
Many investors are linked to Chicago Mayor Richard M. Daley.

O'Malley obtained commitments from over 80 prospective Park Grill investors, including some of Mayor Daley's friends and neighbors. Each share of the restaurant cost investors $200,000. Among the investors are Daley's friend Fred Barbara, a nephew of the late Chicago Alderman Fred Roti. Barbara has ties to the Hired Truck Program scandal and the blue bag recycling controversy. Other investors include relatives of Daley's political adviser Timothy Degnan, two neighbors of the mayor, Ray Chin, an O'Hare Airport contractor, and Rick Simon, a controversial figure who runs a janitorial business and sits on the board of the Chicago Convention and Tourism Bureau. Also among the investors was Daley's cousin Theresa E. Mintle, then the Chicago Transit Authority's director of governmental affairs and former congressman Morgan F. Murphy, who has had business dealings with convicted labor union official John Serpico. Among the vendors for Park Grill was an architectural metal company owned by the son of then Chicago Alderman Burton Natarus (42nd).

=== Contract award process ===
O'Malley's and two other groups submitted proposals to run the restaurant in September 2001. The Park Grill group's proposal was twice as long as the other two but, technically, promised the Park District the lowest revenues. By the end of the year, O'Malley's team had been selected to run the restaurant, souvenir and concession stands, and a cafe in the new Millennium Park.

The Park Grill contract was signed February 11, 2003. The contract requires that Park Grill to pay a percent of net sales and an additional fee of $275,000 per year, but the latter was not due until the Park Grill recouped half its build-out costs. As part of its deal, the Park District pays for water, gas, and garbage collection at Park Grill. The garbage pickup costs taxpayers about $245,000 annually.

=== Park District project manager's relationship with contractor ===
The Park District team, including an outside consultant, spent 18 months negotiating a contract with O'Malley's group. During that time, Laura Foxgrover, a top official in the Park District department directly overseeing the deal, gave birth to O'Malley's child. (Note: see also additional references) Prior to working for the Park District, Foxgrover had been an employee of O'Malley as director of operations at the Chicago Firehouse Restaurant. Foxgrover held the title "senior project manager" at the Park District at an annual salary of $94,000. In May 2002, Foxgrover wrote a memo recusing herself from negotiations, without saying why, and never told her superiors she was carrying O'Malley's child. The girl was born in September, 2002.

Foxgrover remained involved in the Millennium Park restaurant after she recused herself from contract negotiations in May, 2002. In October 2003, Foxgrover spoke in favor of the restaurant getting a liquor license before a Chicago City Council committee while O'Malley owed Foxgrover at least $5,000. On the same day, Foxgrover worked to get O'Malley's Clock Tower Cafe a liquor license. In one July 2003 e-mail, Foxgrover, then the acting director of park services, said that if O'Malley's contractor had any questions for the Park District, she will be the point person. In August 2003, Horan sent out an e-mail mentioning a discussion Horan had with Foxgrover, in which Horan asked Foxgrover if the Park District would waive a form of insurance on the restaurant's construction. A provision in the Park Grill contract allows the restaurant to arrange a series of summer concerts on the Millennium Park ice-skating rink, drawing crowds that bolster food and drink sales. In summer 2004, O'Malley and his partners asked Clear Channel-owned WNUA Radio to conduct the concerts. In February 2005, Foxgrover led a five-member Park District committee that chose Clear Channel over JAM Productions to operate the new concert venue at Northerly Island on the former site of Meigs Field.

Foxgrover was the subject of an ethics investigation. An ethics officer for the Chicago Board of Ethics concluded that Foxgrover did not violate the district's ethics ordinance and should be allowed to keep her $90,000-a-year job as the Park District's director of development. By 2008, Foxgrover had left the Park District to work for O'Malley's restaurant management company.

=== Exemption from property tax ===
On March 16, 2005, Cook County Assessor, James Houlihan's office sent Horan and O'Malley a letter notifying Park Grill that it was being assessed at $502,550 and that it would be sent a bill in the fall for 2004 property taxes. On August 5, 2005, Horan and O'Malley filed a lawsuit against the assessor, asking that a judge prohibit the county from imposing property taxes. The owners asserted that their contract to run Park Grill was a property tax exempt concessionaire agreement and not a taxable lease. The state's attorney's office, which defended the assessor in the case, said "our position is that the Park Grill is a leaseholder and as a leaseholder they are subject to taxes." In 2009, an appellate court affirmed the circuit court's finding that the agreement to run Park Grill was not a lease but a license. In December 2010, the Illinois Supreme Court with a 4-3 vote affirmed the lower court decisions maintaining the Park Grill's "agreement with the Park District created an untaxable license as opposed to a taxable lease" to do business.

=== Daley administration response ===
Mayor Richard M. Daley criticized the Park Grill deal, blaming Chicago's Corporation Counsel Mara Georges, saying that lawyers for the city and the Chicago Park District erred and that the city wanted to renegotiate the pact. "Lawyers do make mistakes," Daley said. "That's what it was. ... It's embarrassing to them. Yes it is - the corporation counsel and the Park District counsel." Chicago Park District Superintendent Tim Mitchell said the Park District also wanted to renegotiate the contract. In a February 9, 2005 letter to O'Malley and Horan, Georges warned that the concession agreement "does not authorize your occupation of the Park Grill facilities" because the city owns the land, and City Hall should have been party to the original agreement when it was not. On February 11, 2005, Daley asked state lawmakers to impose tougher penalties for defrauding tax payers, and was questioned by reporters about why the Park Grill had not paid any property taxes and gets free gas, water and garbage pick-up. Erma Tranter, president of the Friends of the Parks watchdog group, speaking at a Park District Board of Commissioners meeting, questioned why the Park Grill contract had yet to be renegotiated 11 months after Mayor Daley vowed to do so. The Chicago Sun-Times dubbed the Park Grill the "Clout Cafe" and included the contract award process in a year-end review of 2005 Daley administration scandals.

=== Profitability ===
The grand opening was set for November 24, 2003. In its first year of operation, Park Grill paid $162,656.72 in rent. The Park Grill began making money for its investors in 2006, its third year of operation, when investors split $527,250 in profits. In 2008, the Park Grill was named one of the top 100 highest-grossing independent restaurants in the U.S., serving approximately 300,000 meals and grossing approximately US$12 million in sales, making it the seventh largest independent restaurant in terms of sales in Chicago in 2007, according to Restaurants & Institutions magazine. The Park Grill remains exempt from property taxes, and the contract has not been renegotiated.

=== Emanuel administration response ===
Daley announced he would not seek a seventh term, and in the final months of Daley's last term, the owners of the Park Grill, including O'Malley and Barbara were reported as interested in selling. Daley's successor, Mayor Rahm Emanuel appointed Theresa E. Mintle, one of the Park Grill investors, as his $174,996-a-year chief of staff. Three days after Emanuel took office and Mintle started work as his top aide, Mintle transferred her financial stake in the restaurant to her husband.

On December 1, 2011, the Emanuel administration sued the Park Grill operating company, and the Chicago Park District, asking a judge to end the generous 2003 concession agreement with the Chicago Park District. The city wants the Park Grill operator, which is trying to sell the restaurant, to pay more for the privilege of operating at the park. On December 15, 2011 the Park Grill operators filed a counter suit against the City and Park District. In June, 2013 O'Malley and Foxgrover were married by Illinois Supreme Court Justice Anne M. Burke. By October, 2013 the City had paid more than $749,000 and the Park District more than $585,000 in legal fees. Deposed in August, 2013 in the lawsuit, Daley responded "I don't recall" 139 times. "In the Park Grill situation, city taxpayers were taken advantage of. They did not get a fair pricing for that property," Emanuel said. Chicago Sun-Times columnist Mark Brown summarized "the Park Grill story" as

Guy meets girl. Guy owns a restaurant. Girl handles valuable Park District restaurant concession. Guy and girl make a baby together. Guy gets concession deal. Mayor knows nothing. Nothing! But a bunch of his pals invest in what city lawyers later call a "sweetheart deal."

On September 24, 2015, the court ruled in favor of the Park Grill, rejecting the Emanuel administration's claims that the contract was invalid.

== Menu ==
The menu is traditional American food with international influences. Zagats describes the cuisine as New American. Bernard Laskowski, formerly of Chicago restaurants Marche and mk, is the executive chef. The Park Cafe, adjacent to the Park Grill, offers takeout food such as salads and sandwiches.

== Critical reviews ==
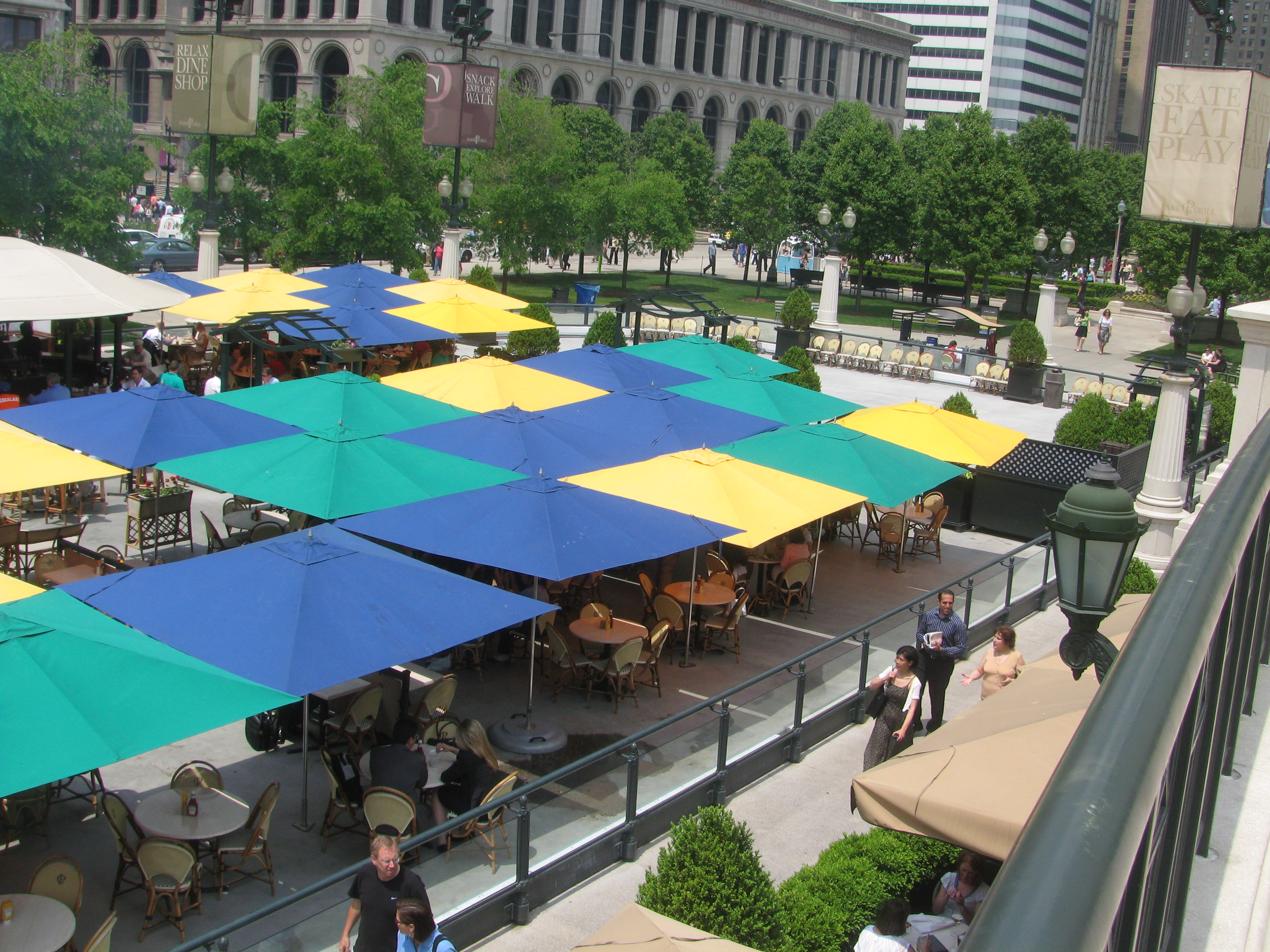
Outdoor seating at the Park Grill Plaza is highly regarded for its views.

The restaurant is notable for its views, its location, and its cuisine, especially its hamburgers. Zagat lists Park Grill as one of the "choice outdoor spots in town." New City Chicago magazine named it one of the top 100 essential restaurants in the city, urging, "Ignore the scandal over sweetheart deals with the city for a moment and consider this: Park Grill sits in the hottest spot in the city today, if not in America." In the 2006/07 and 2008/09 editions, Zagats respondents ranked it among the best of Chicago in the "Outdoors" and "Views" categories and lauded its fireplace.

Park Grill hamburgers achieved high citywide rankings in several publications, including best burgers in Time Out Chicago (2005), Chicago Magazine (2008) and Citysearch (2008).

The Unofficial Guide to Chicago points out the "spectacular view of the Chicago skyline, fronted by the ice rink at Millennium Park." Fodor's Chicago 2010 says "Location trumps service at Park Grill, where a seat on the patio in summer, in full view of Millennium Park, is among the best in the city. Sadly, the waitstaff lapses ..." The National Geographic's website's Chicago Walking Tour: Millennium and Grant Parks recommends the Park Grill as it "allows you to admire the surrounding architecture passively." The restaurant was noted as one of the "99 Best of Chicago," named as one of three under the category of "Best Restaurants with a View" in Night+Day Chicago. The location, "under 'the bean' or next to a swarm of ice skaters, all convenient to the Loop," was cited by Crain's Chicago Business as a reason for including Park Grill as one of Chicago's best restaurants for business dining in 2010.

== See also ==
- List of New American restaurants
- Hired Truck Program
- Chicago Parking Meters LLC
