= Chicago Parking Meters =

American parking meter company

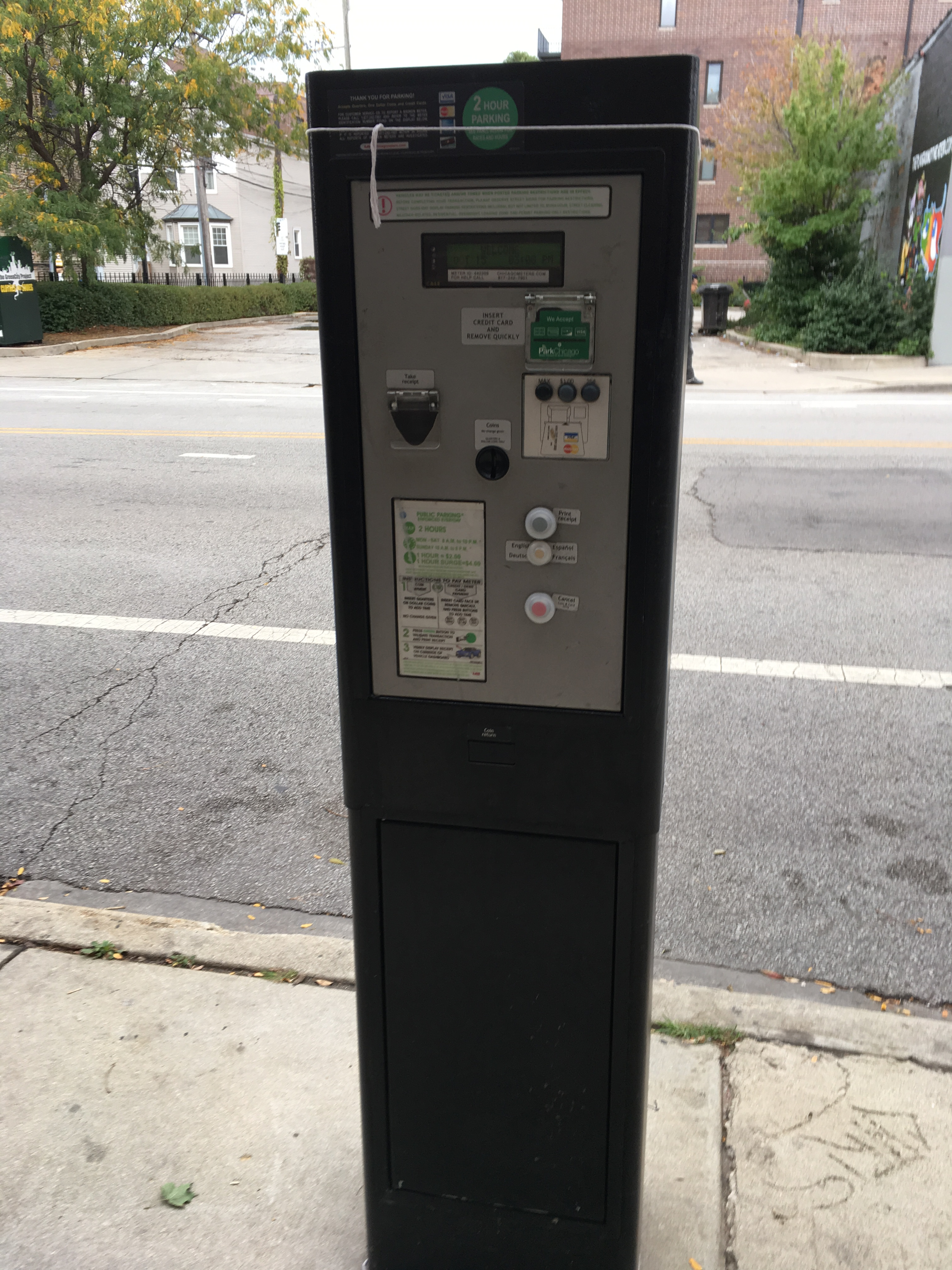
A pay box in Chicago, operated by Chicago Parking Meters LLC

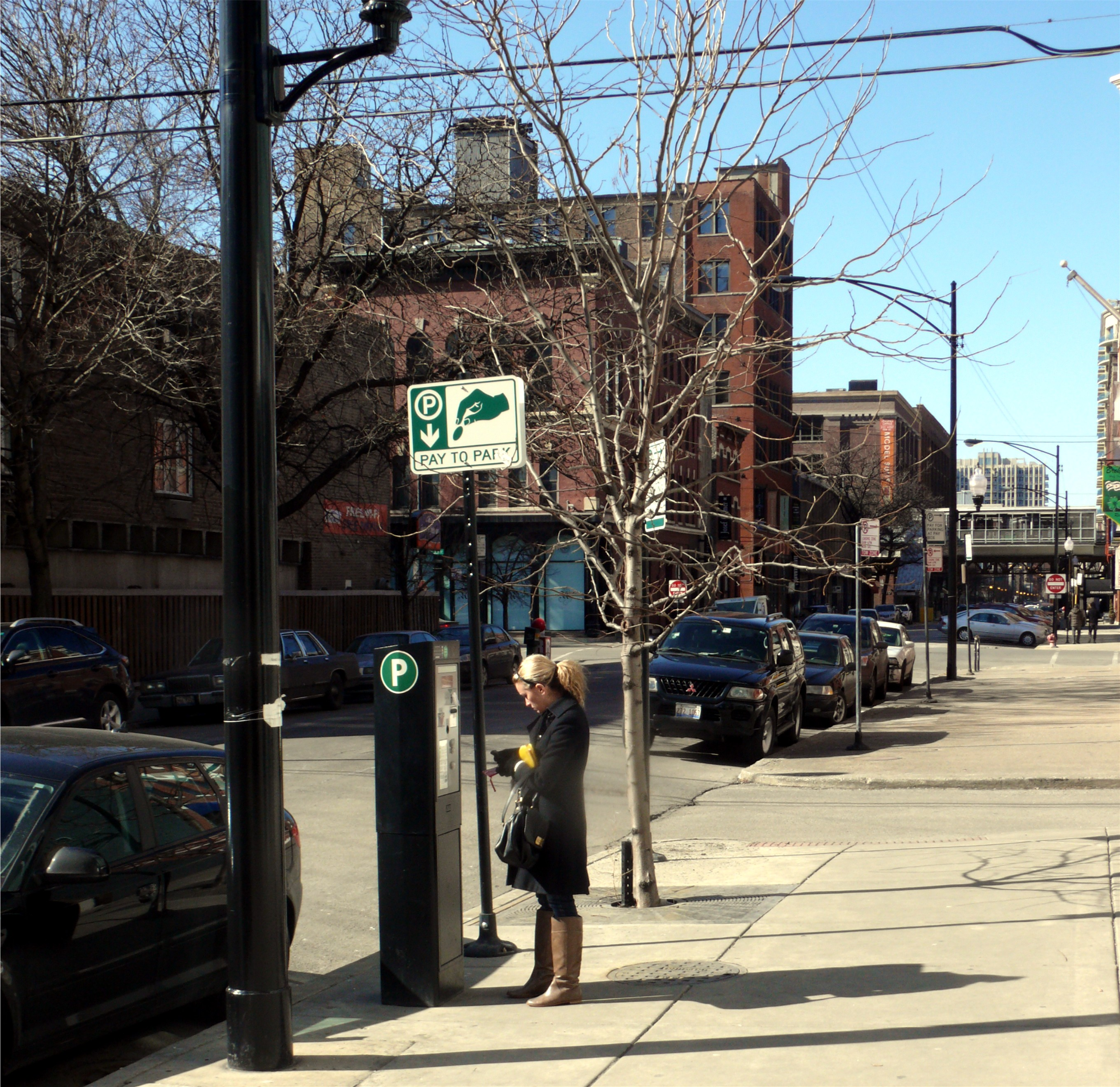
A Chicagoan pays at a pay box

Chicago Parking Meters, LLC, doing business as ParkChicago, is an American company with several investors that owns the parking meters in the city of Chicago, Illinois. It has gained notoriety for its roots in the 2008 sale of the City of Chicago's parking meters to private investors, considered a financial disaster for the city.

== History ==
During the 2008 financial crisis, the City of Chicago faced a major budget deficit, which prompted then-Mayor Richard M. Daley to propose the sale of city-owned parking meters. Brokers affiliated with Morgan Stanley then formed an LLC called "Chicago Parking Meters LLC" to facilitate a potential deal with the city over the sale of the meters.

By December 3, 2008, a deal was made to sell all 36,000 of the parking meter spots in the city for 75 years for $1.15 billion. The deal was approved by the Chicago City Council on December 2, 2008, in a 40–5 vote. It was approved and finalized on December 4. When the deal went through, prices increased and many meters were vandalized.

A 2009 report conducted by then-Inspector General David Hoffman, found that the city was paid "conservatively, $974 million less" than what the city would have received from 75 years of parking meter revenue if it hadn't leased out the meters.

In 2013, then-Mayor Rahm Emanuel negotiated changes to the deal, reducing the city's liability to reimburse investors for every parking space taken out of service by agreeing to increase the hours and days motorists paid for parking. The 2013 deal also included an agreement to move 176 parking pay boxes from city control to CPM LLC control.

During the COVID-19 pandemic in 2020, then-Mayor Lori Lightfoot announced an order that parking tickets would “only” be issued for safety reasons and that parking at an expired meter did not represent a public safety threat. Lightfoot also reminded motorists that they should still pay to park at meters. The order was in effect for two and a half months.

During 2020, the city also reclaimed 4,007 parking spaces managed by CPM LLC, then returned 2,646 of those parking spaces back two months later, keeping a total of 1,361 spaces for the city. The order and reclaiming of parking spots created years of litigation leading to a settlement of $15.5 million for the city to compensate CPM LLC for meter violations, the suspension of parking tickets, and a dispute over the distribution of meter revenue.

In 2023, the investors in CPM LLC have recouped their investment plus $500 million, and still have 60 years left on the deal. As of 2025, an audit revealed the meters, in total, generated $1.97 billion through 2024 for CPM LLC.

Investment firm Stonepeak purchased CPM in September 2026 for $2.53 billion. The transaction was completed the following month.

== Criticism ==
The contract has been widely criticized as a problematic example of privatization. Part of the deal is that if any of the metered parking spots are not available as such, for any reason—i.e., parades, street maintenance, electrification for electric vehicles, bike lanes, or outdoor seating—then the city must compensate CPM LLC for their projected losses. The high cost of compensation was criticized as limiting development of city infrastructure.

== See also ==
- Hired Truck Program
- Park Grill
