= Tourism in Chicago =

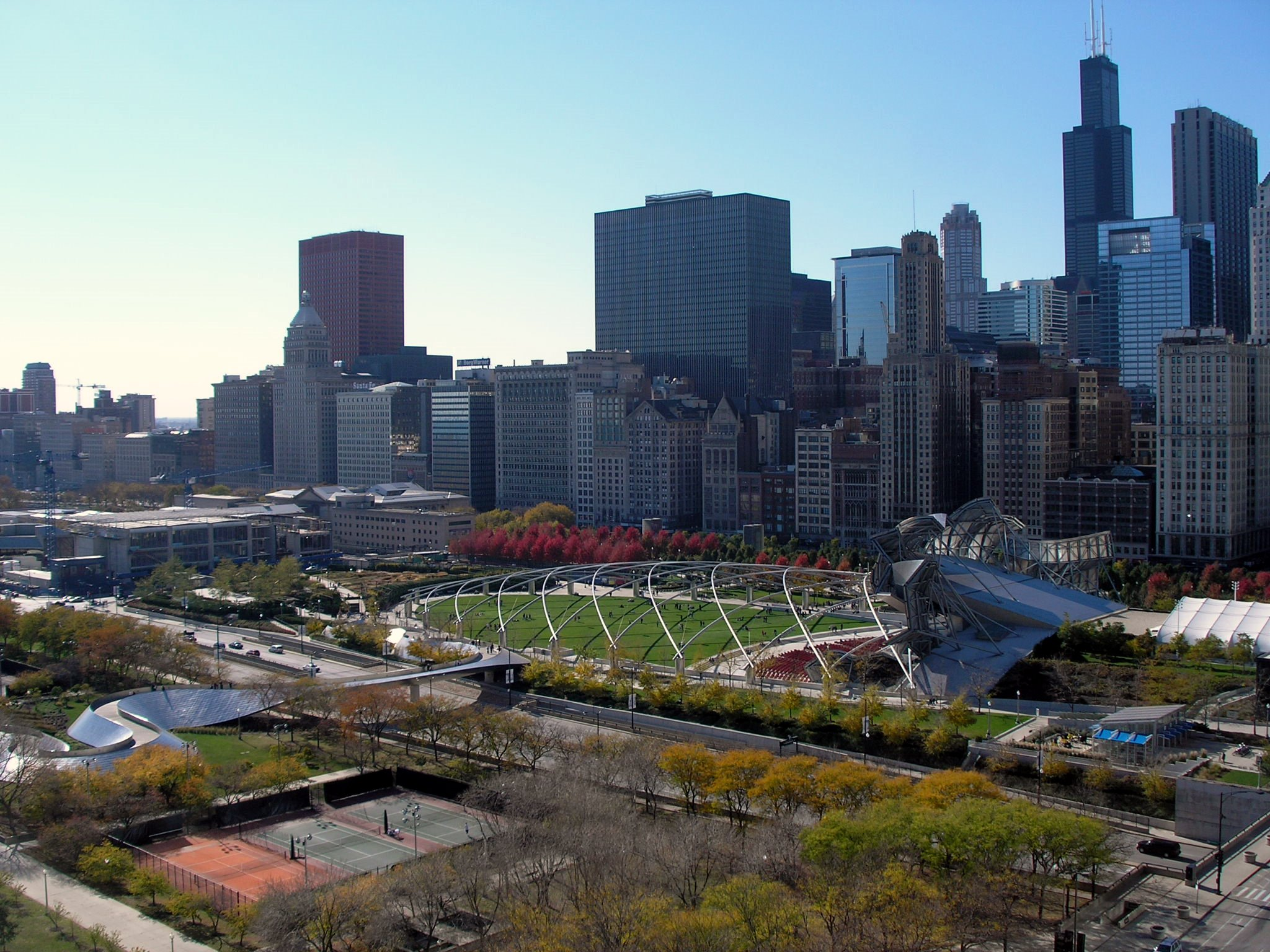
Millennium Park and the Michigan Avenue are ground-zero for tourists in Chicago

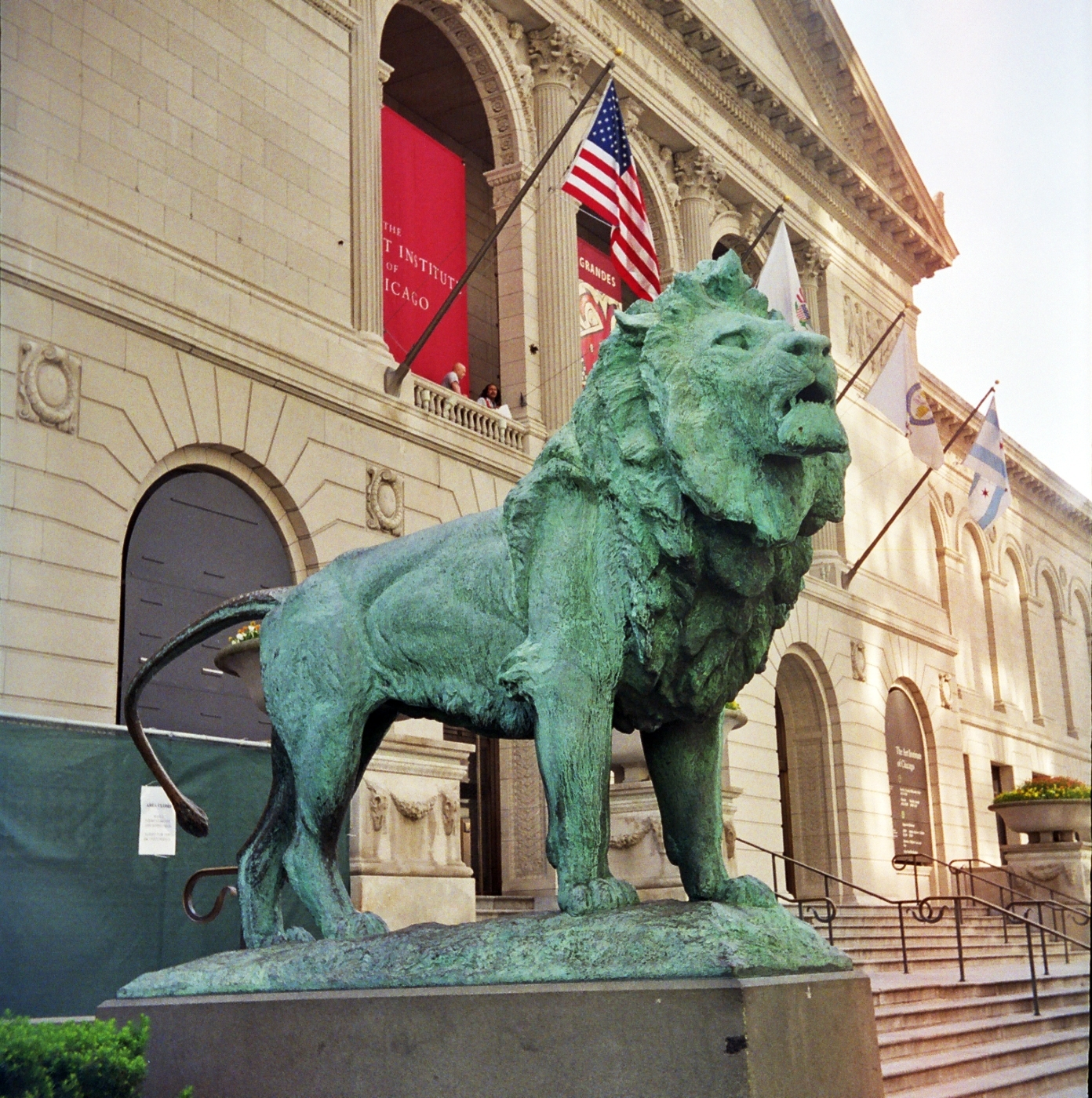
The Art Institute of Chicago contains a world-class collection that draws tourists and locals alike

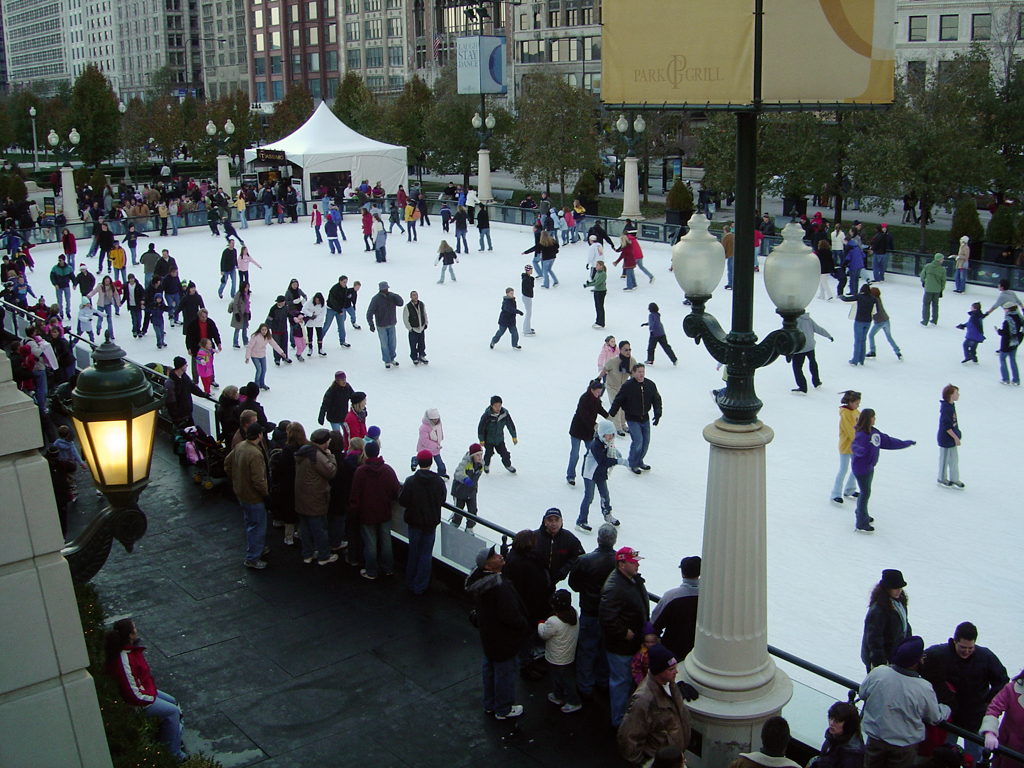
Ice skating in Millennium Park is a popular winter attraction

Tourism in Chicago draws on the city's architecture, museums, restaurants, sports, parks and beaches, theater and wide variety of neighborhood attractions.

In 2017, Millennium Park alone saw 25 million visitors, making it the top tourist destination in the Midwest and among the top ten in the United States.

In 2023, Chicago saw 51.96 million tourist arrivals, and tourism expenditure set a new record at $19.2 billion. Of these, 1.83 million were international visitors.

Prior to the COVID-19 pandemic, tourist arrivals had peaked at 61.58 million people in 2019.

== Market overview ==
Major conventions are held at McCormick Place. The historic Chicago Cultural Center (1897) serves as the city's Visitor Information Center. Tourists will find sites of interest in Grant Park which contains Millennium Park, Buckingham Fountain (1927), and the Art Institute of Chicago. Millennium Park's Cloud Gate sculpture and fountain's two towers incorporate LED facial images. Events such as the Grant Park Music Festival take place in the city. Chicago performing arts venues include the Harris Theater for Music and Dance and the Chicago Opera Theater.

Navy Pier, east of Streeterville, contains retail, restaurants, museums, exhibition halls and auditoriums. Its 15-story Ferris wheel is among the most visited landmarks with about 8 million visitors each year.

The city's Museum Campus, holds: the Adler Planetarium & Astronomy Museum, the Field Museum of Natural History, and the Shedd Aquarium. The Museum Campus accesses the Art Institute of Chicago in Grant Park. The Museum of Science and Industry is also a leading attraction.

About one-third of Chicago's tourists enjoy the city's entertainment venues including McCormick Place and the Chicago Theatre.

== Choose Chicago ==
Choose Chicago
- Formation: 2012
- Type: Tourism organization
- Headquarters: 301 E. Cermak Road; Chicago, Illinois; United States
- Key people: Lynn Osmond, President & CEO
- Website: www.choosechicago.com
- Formerly called: Chicago Convention & Tourism Bureau; Chicago Office of Tourism and Culture

Historic logo

Choose Chicago is the official tourism organization for the city. In January 2012, then-Mayor Rahm Emanuel launched Chicago's new tourism organization, Choose Chicago. The Mayor's vision was to restructure all tourism sales and marketing activities under a single, streamlined agency, and outline clear and measurable objectives to track these efforts. Choose Chicago partners with the Metropolitan Pier and Exposition Authority, the Chicago Office of Tourism, the City of Chicago, and the Illinois Department of Commerce and Economic Opportunity's Bureau of Tourism, as well as many other related associations in Chicago. It handles convention sales for McCormick Place and Navy Pier.

== Attractions ==
- Architecture of Chicago
- Beaches in Chicago
- List of Chicago Landmarks
- List of museums and cultural institutions in Chicago
- McCormick Tribune Plaza & Ice Rink
- Parks in Chicago
- Sports in Chicago
- Theatre in Chicago
- Magnificent Mile
- State Street

== Gallery ==
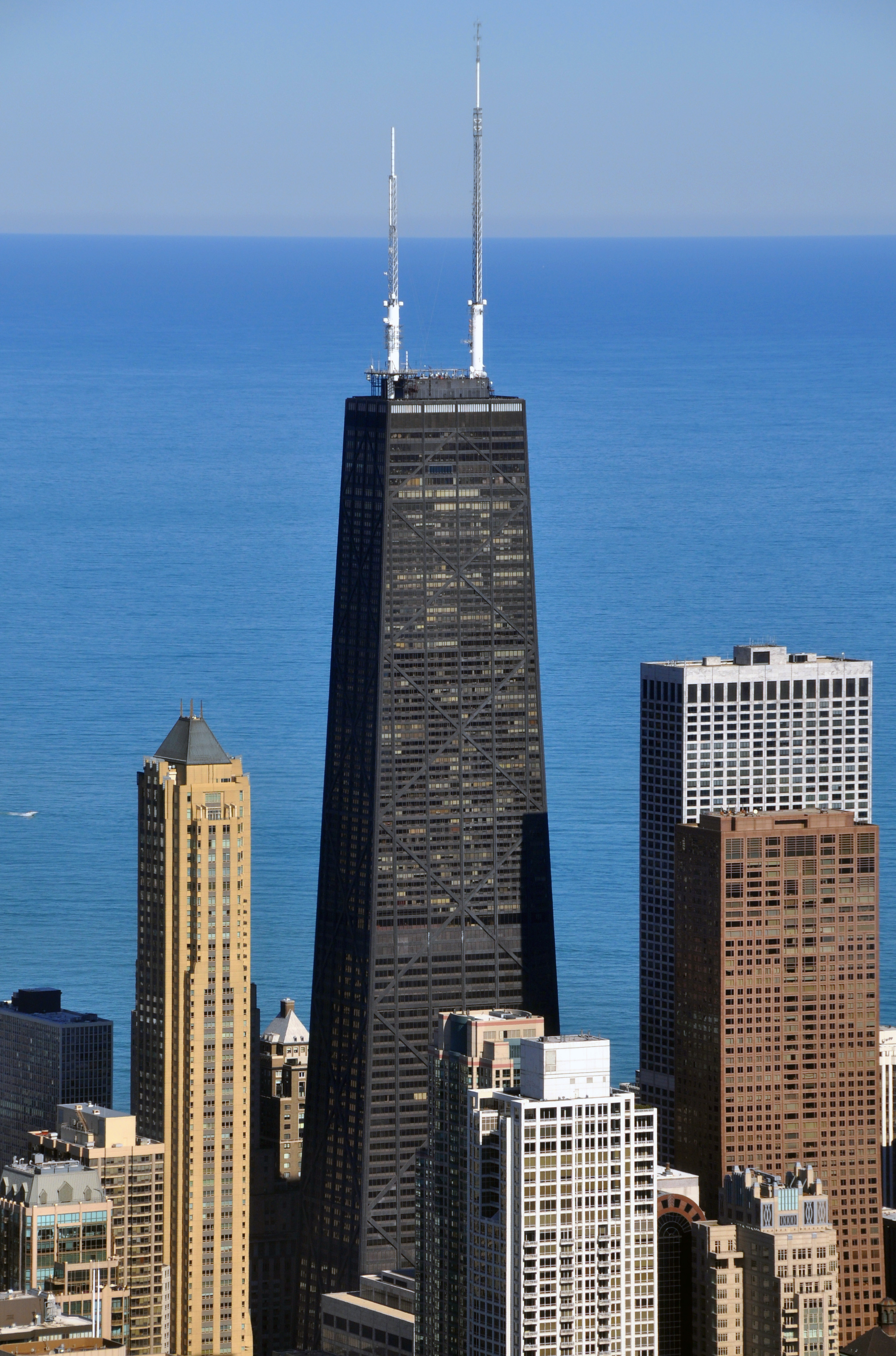
John Hancock Center

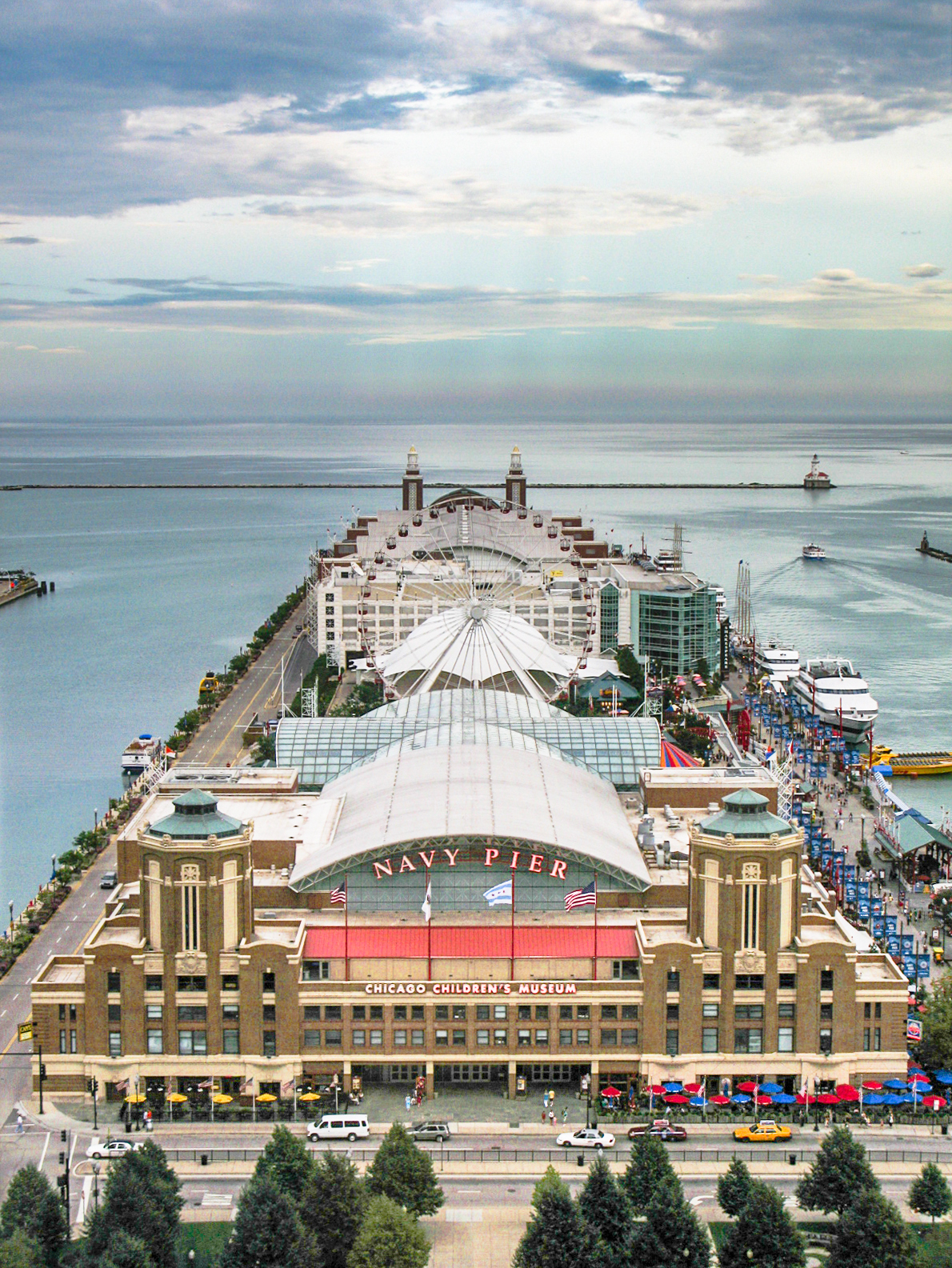
Navy Pier

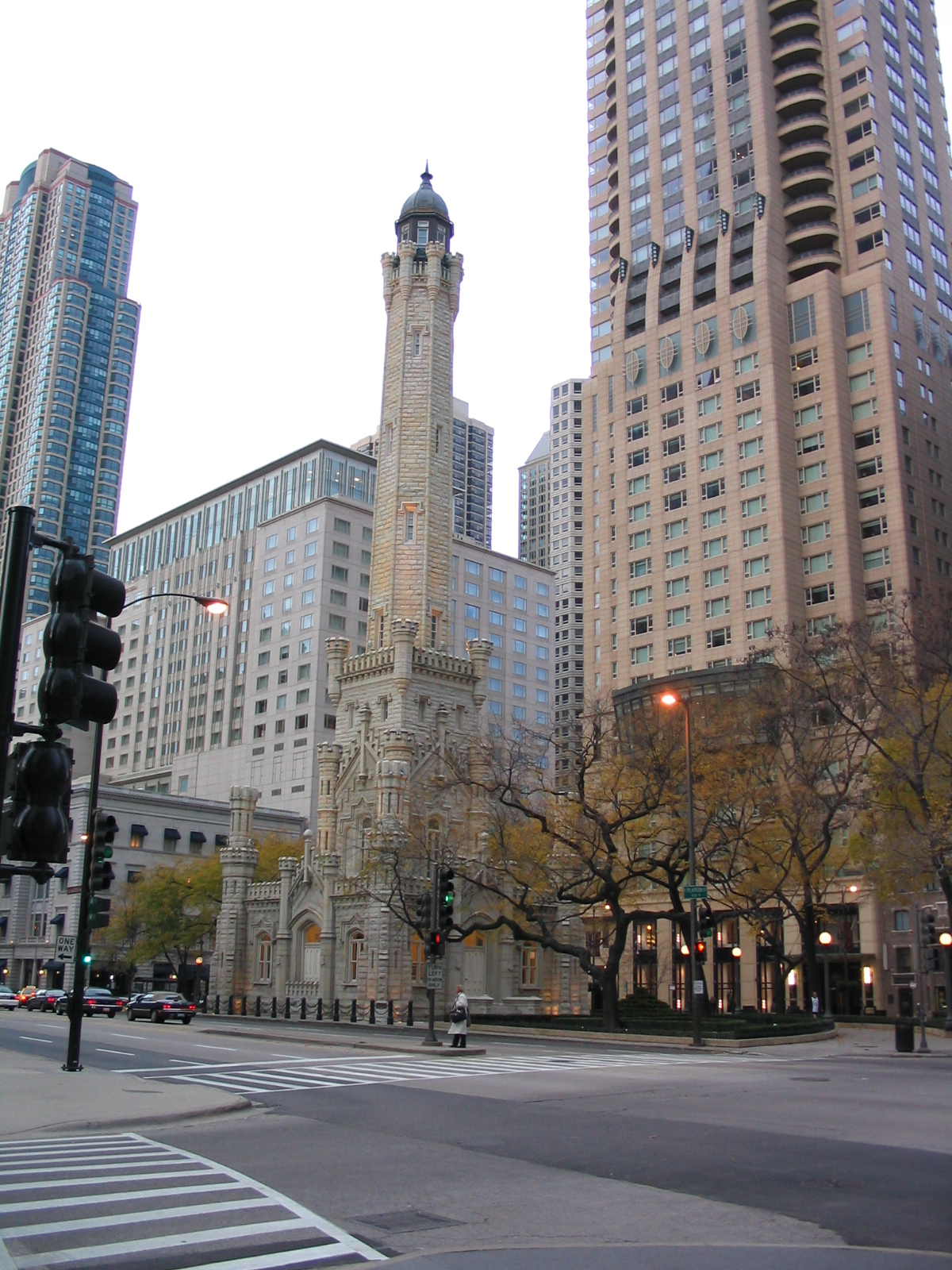
The Magnificent Mile shopping district and landmark Chicago Water Tower

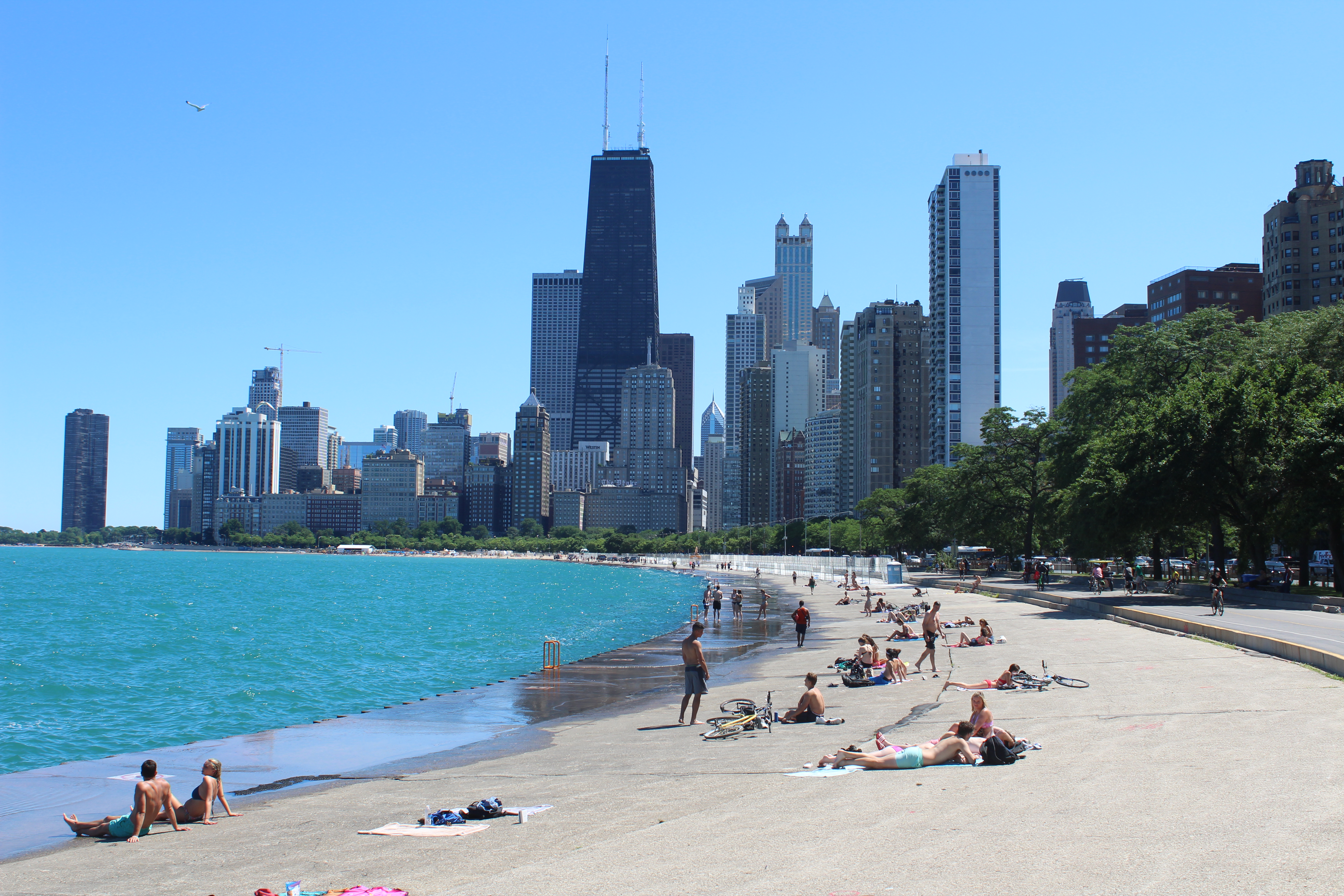
Oak Street Beach

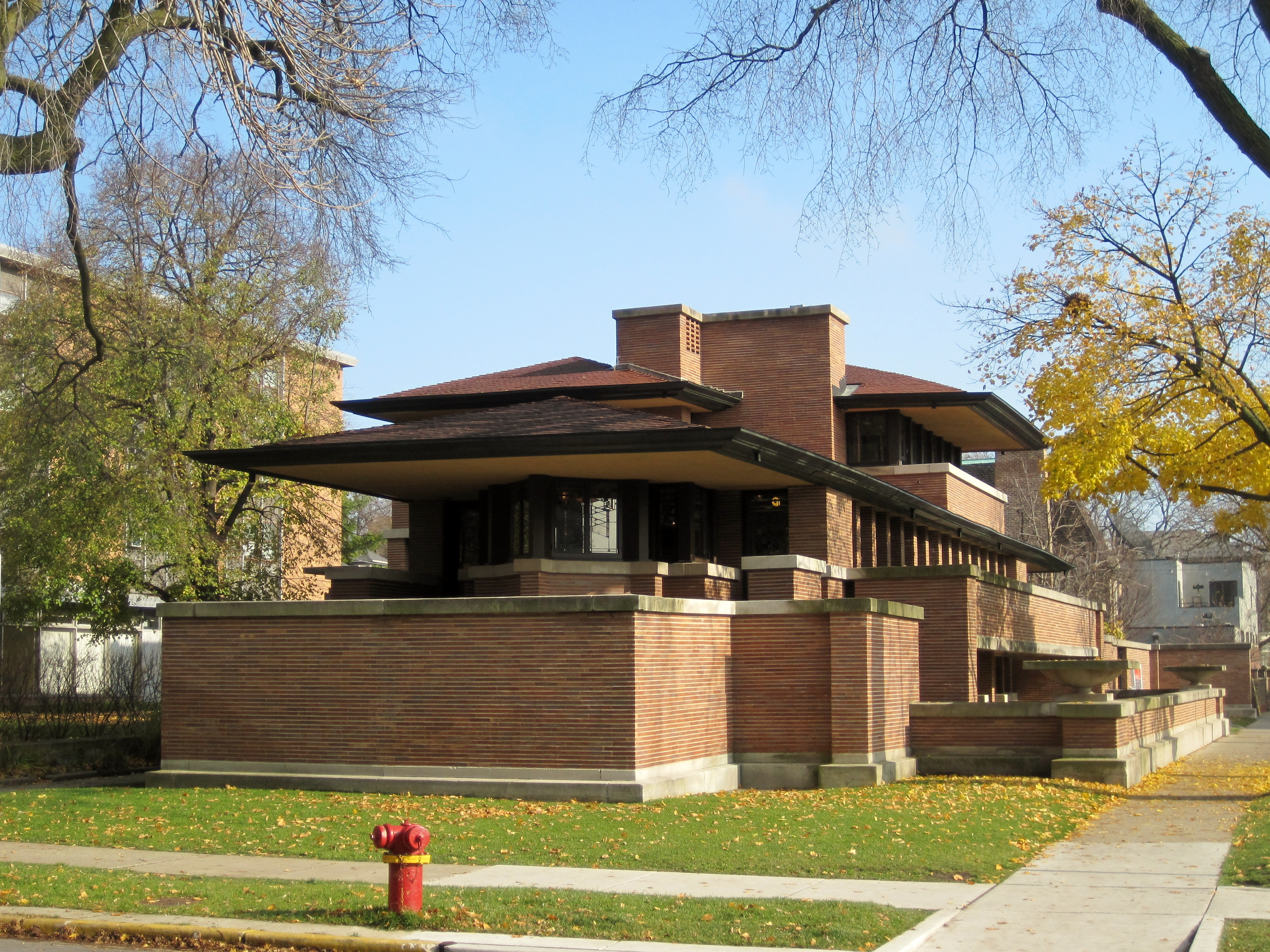
Robie House

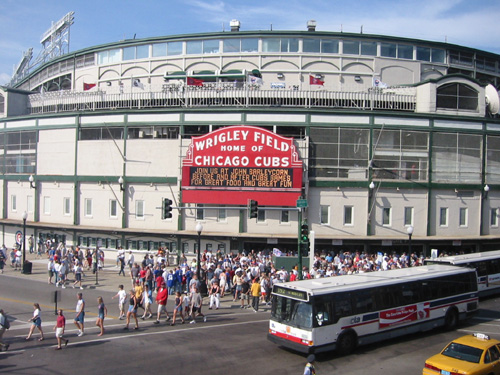
Wrigley Field

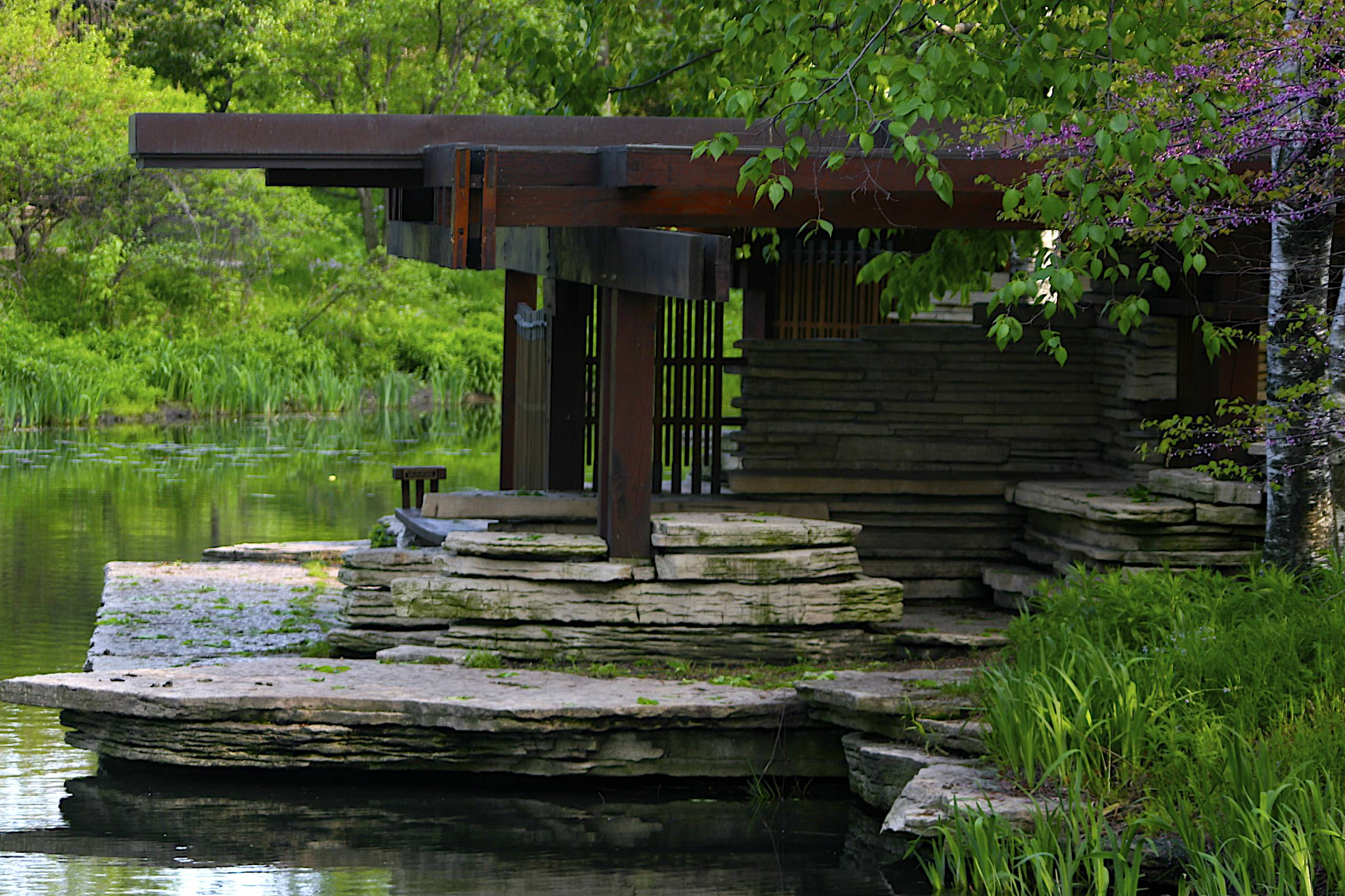
Alfred Caldwell Lily Pool

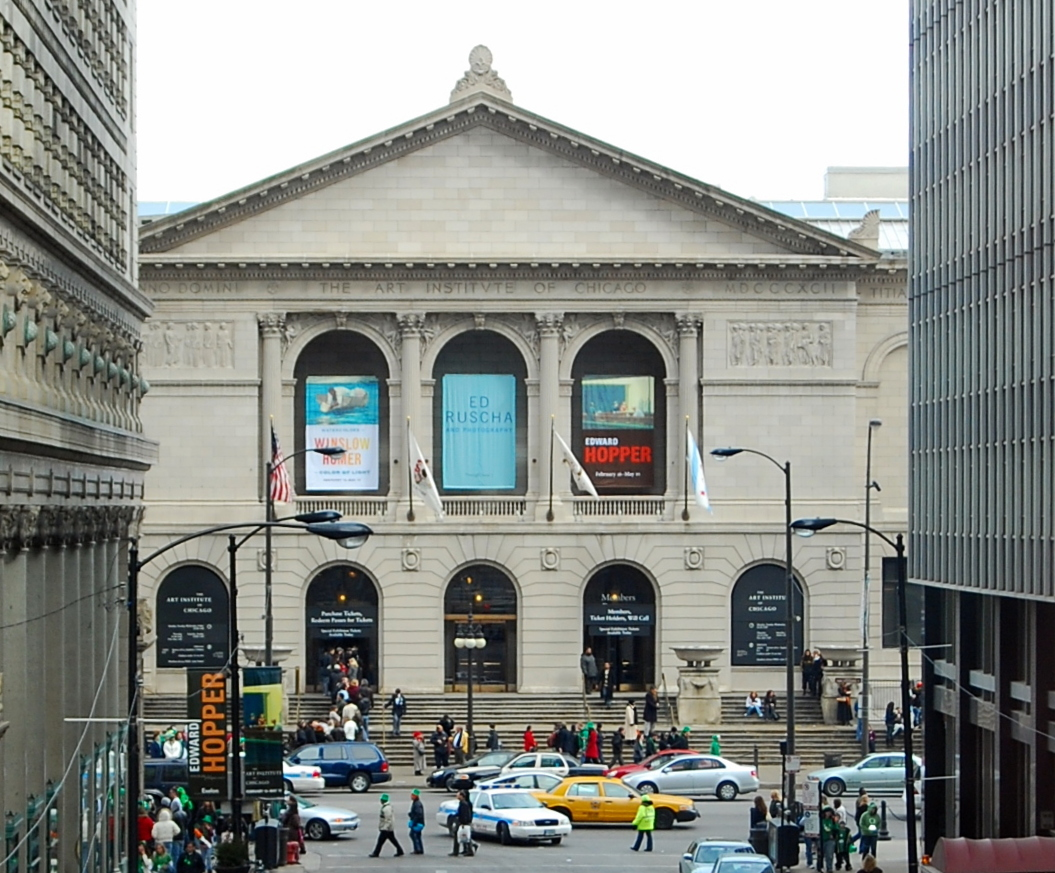
Art Institute of Chicago

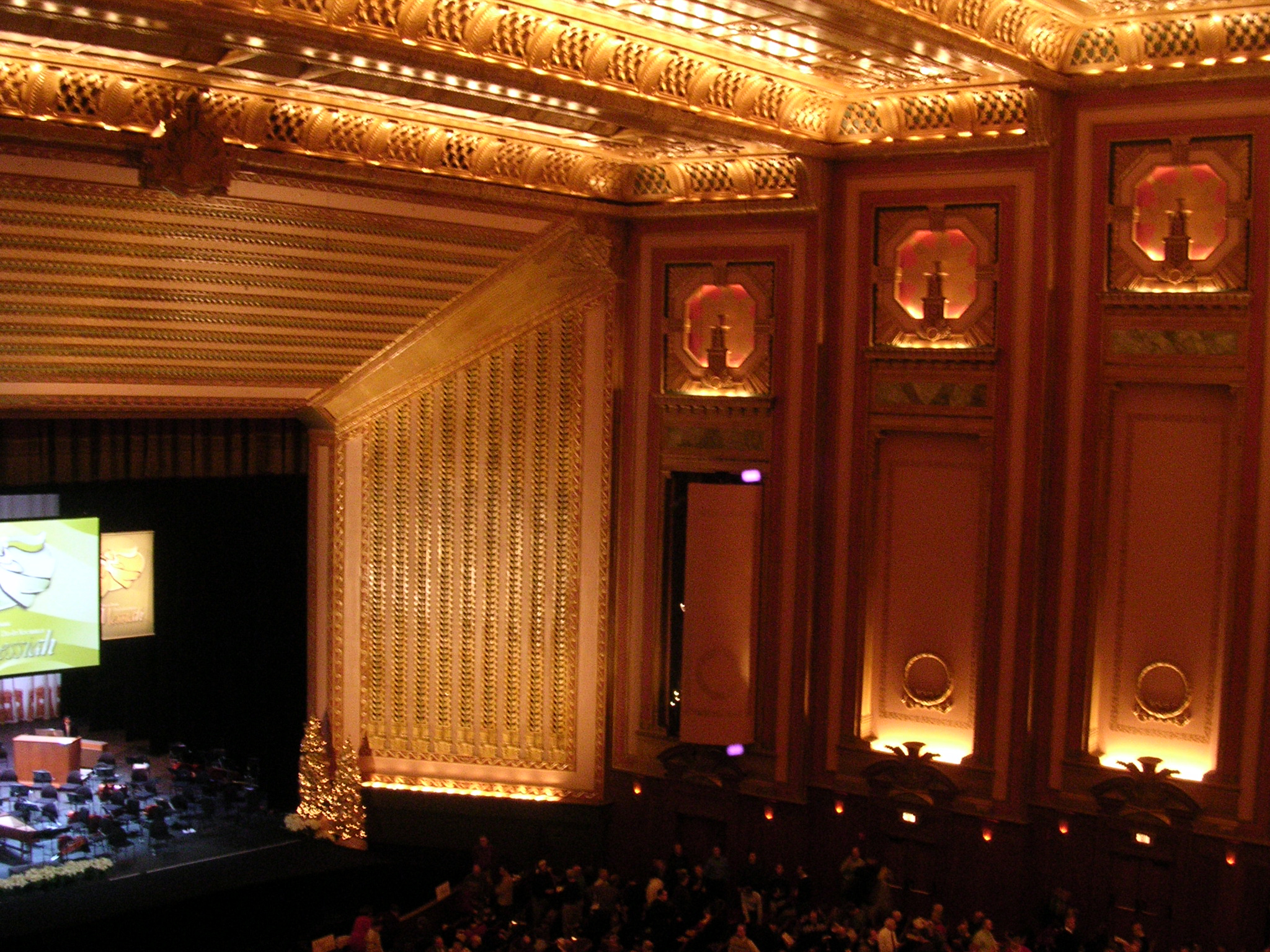
Lyric Opera House

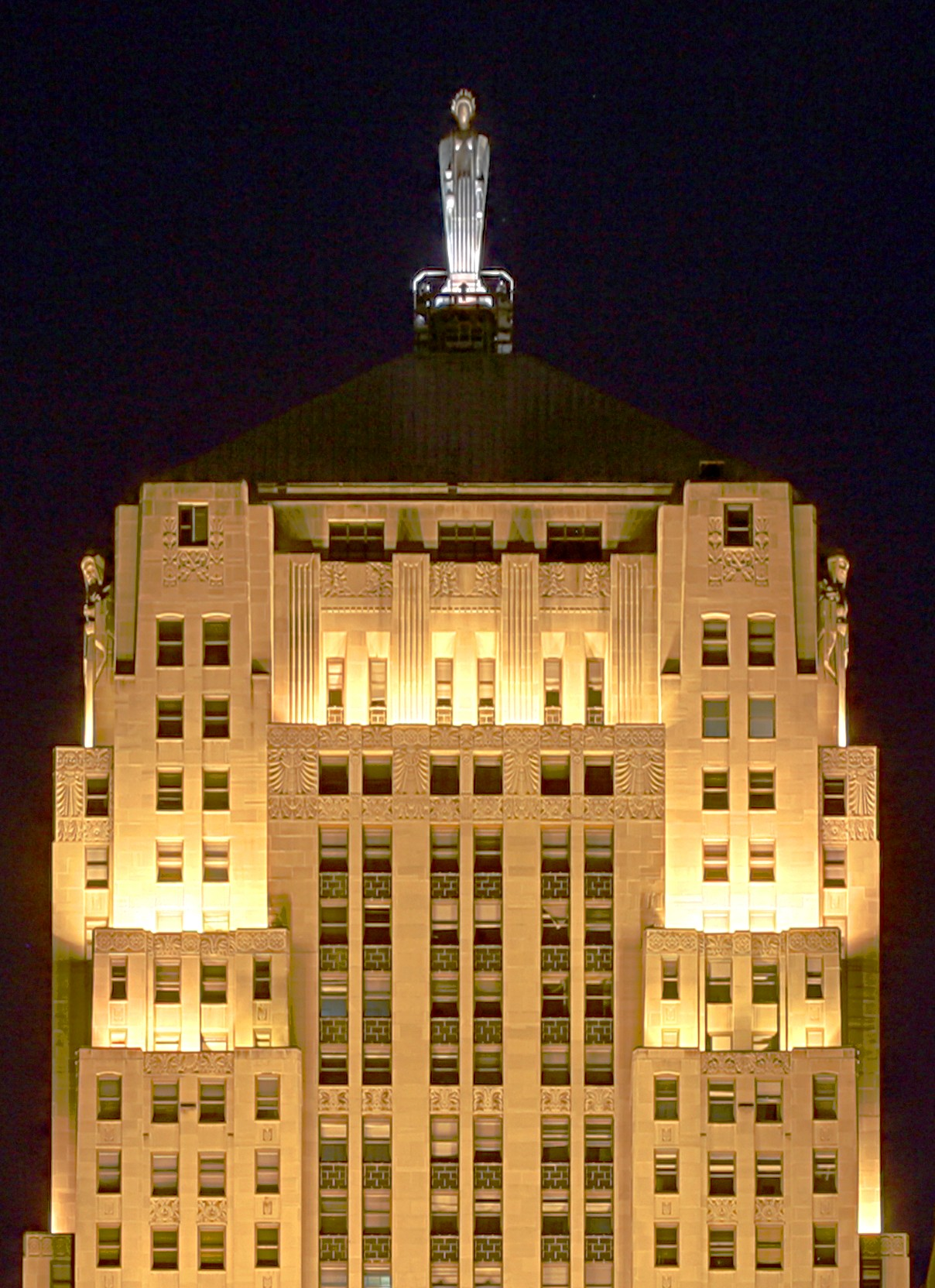
Chicago Board of Trade Building

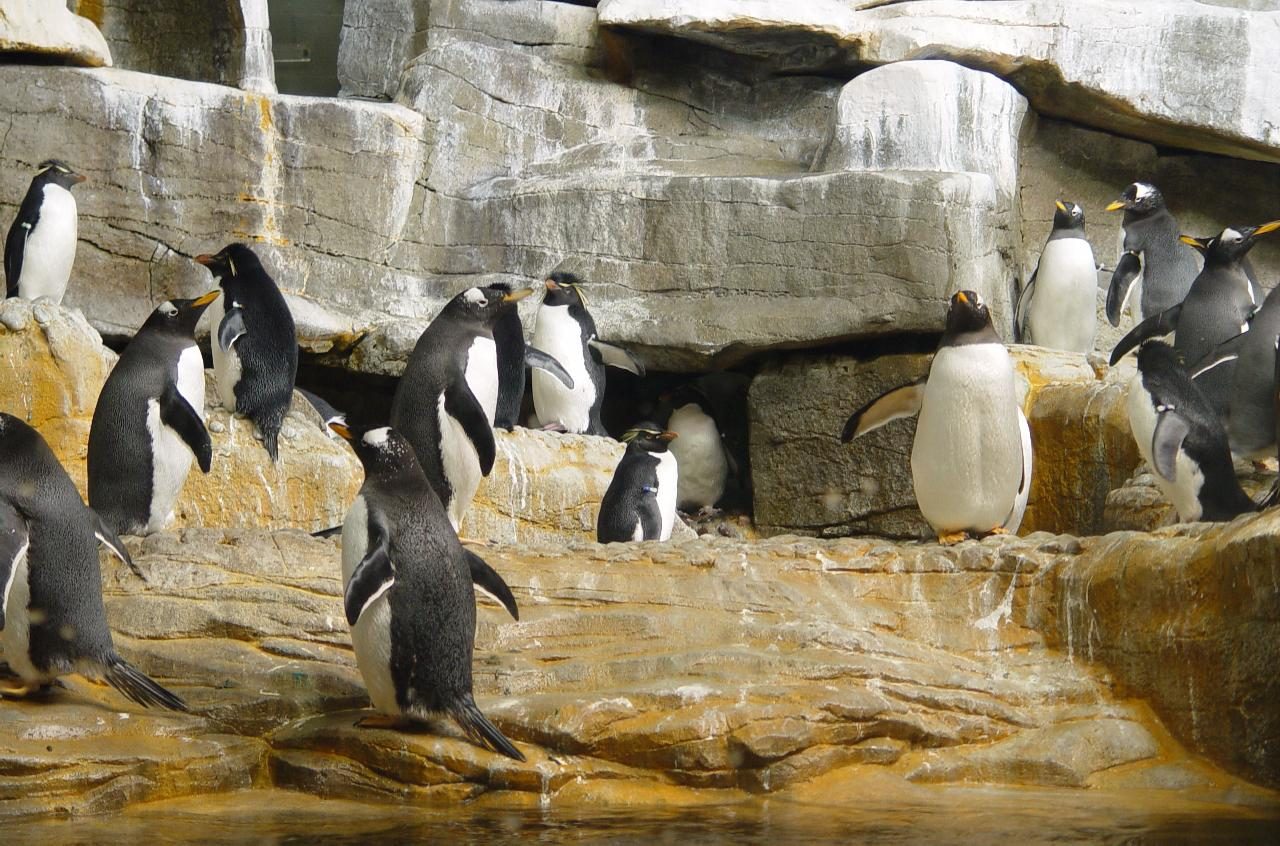
Shedd Aquarium

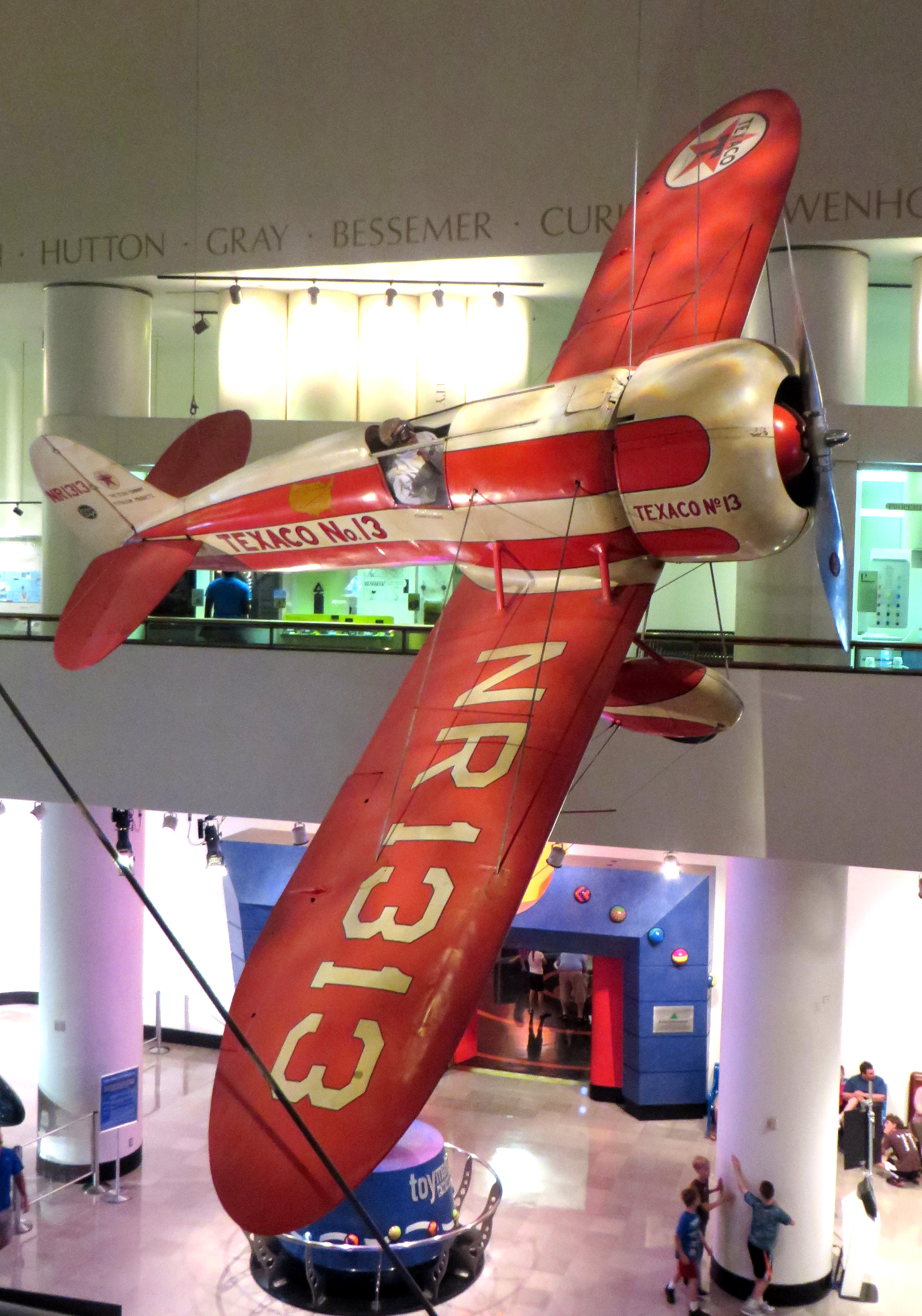
Museum of Science and Industry

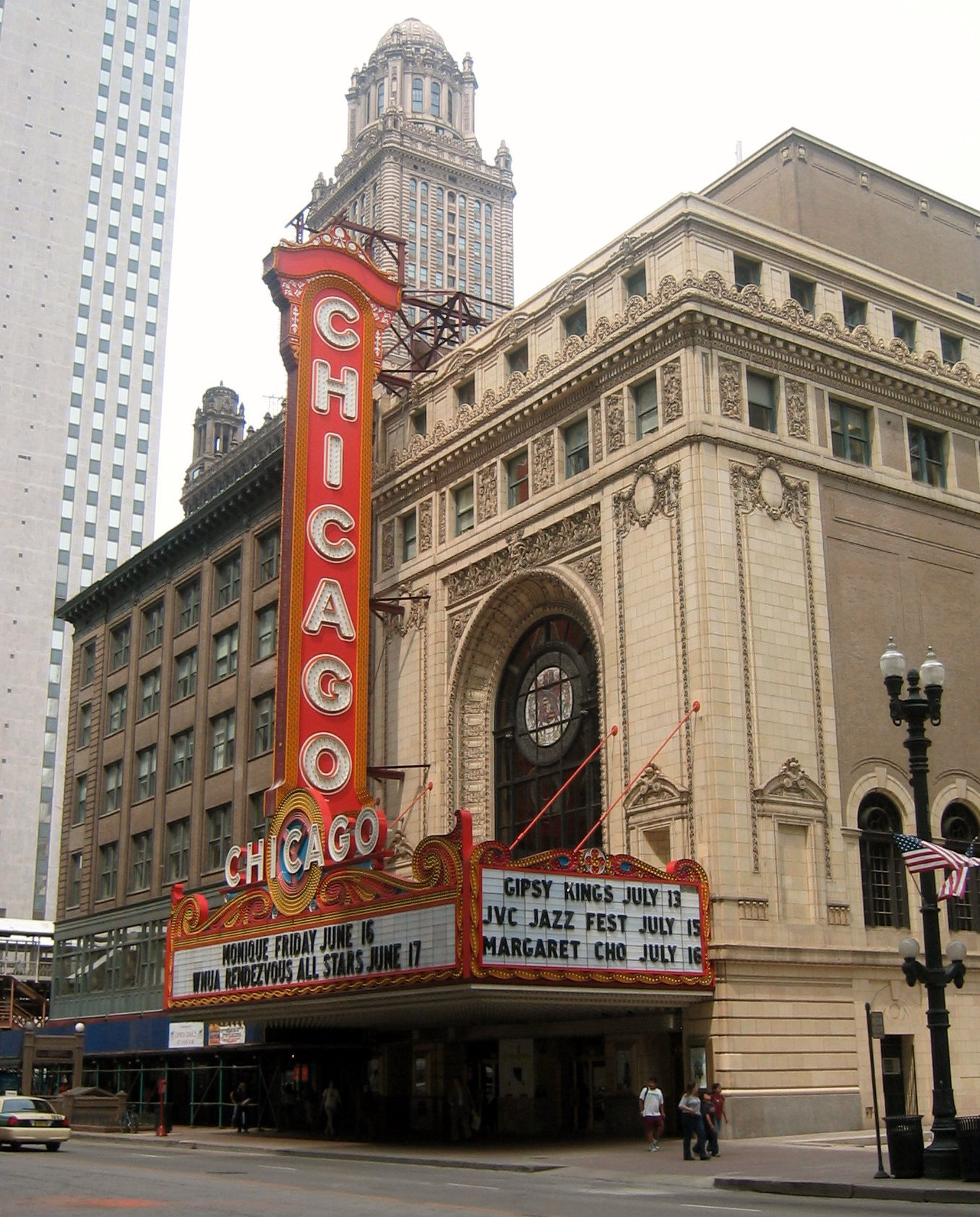
Chicago Theater

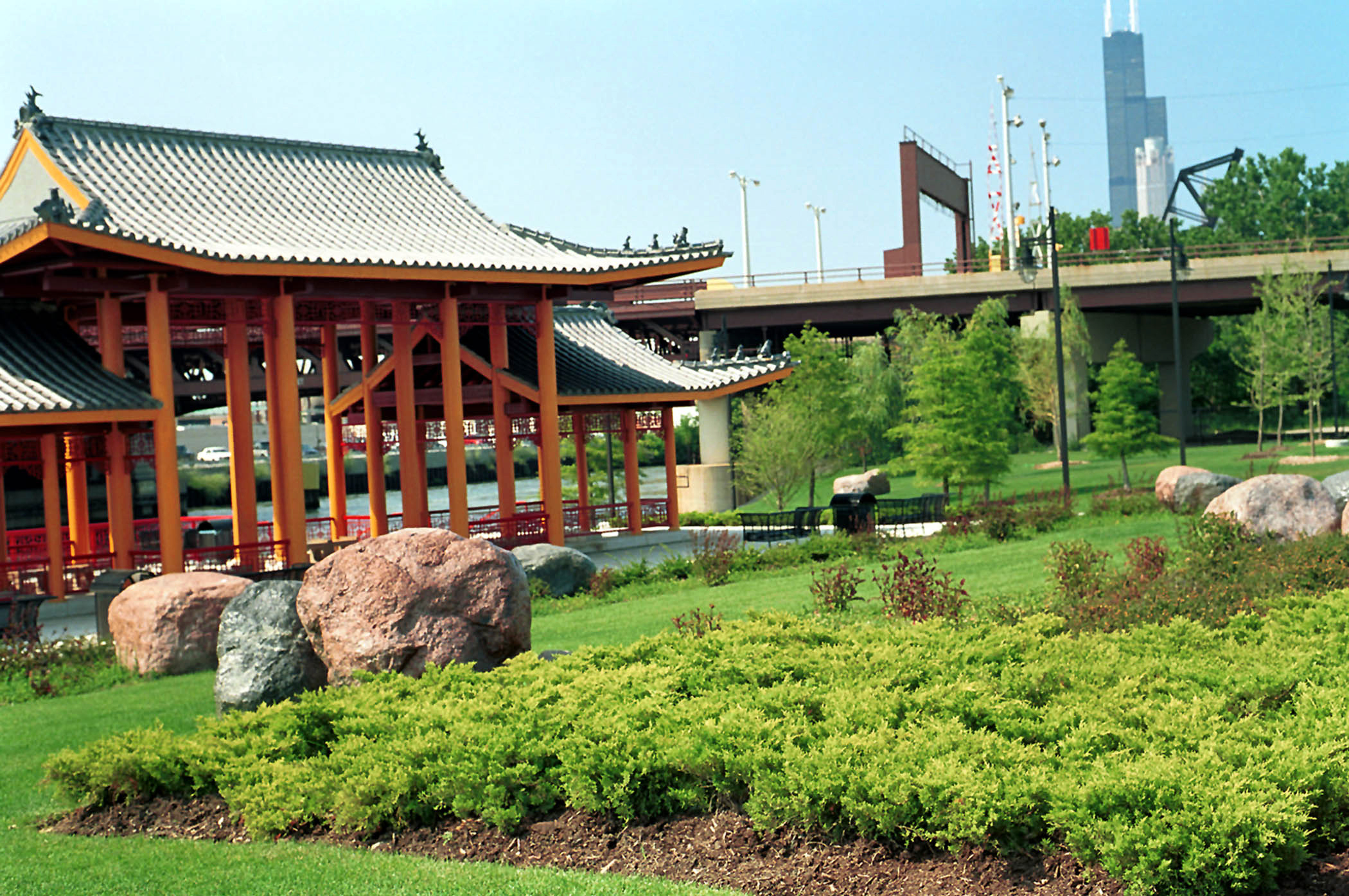
Ping Tom Memorial Park

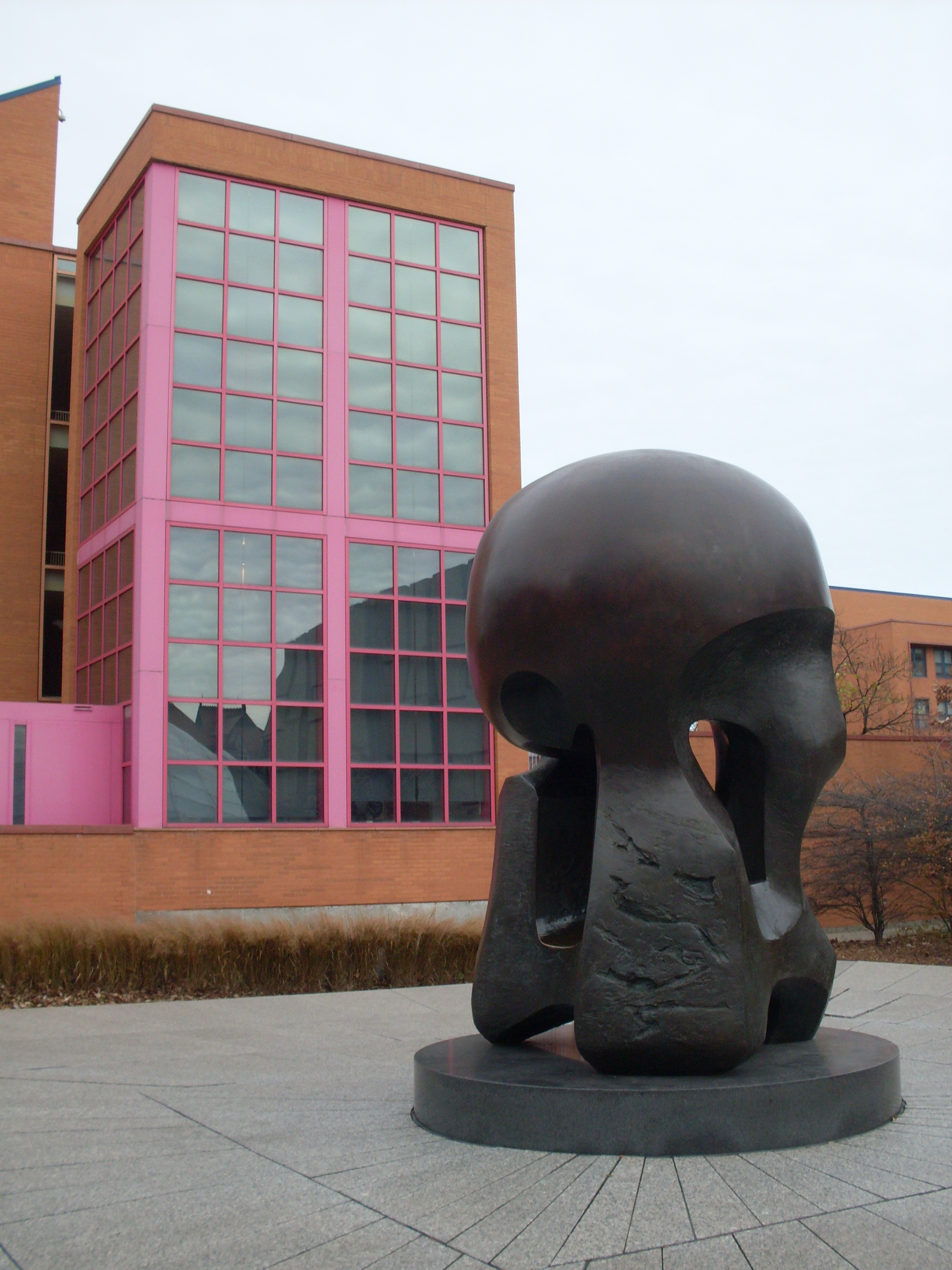
Site of first self-sustaining nuclear chain reaction
