= Hired Truck Program =

Program in the city of Chicago

The Hired Truck Program was a scandal-plagued program in the city of Chicago that involved hiring private trucks to do city work. It was overhauled in 2004 (and phased out beginning in 2005) after an investigation by the Chicago Sun-Times revealed that some participating companies were being paid for doing little or no work, had mob connections, or were tied to city employees. Truck owners also paid bribes in order to get into the program.

The Hired Truck Program officially came to an end Monday, September 18, 2006. At the end of the work day on Friday, September 15, 2006, the final eight Hired Trucks were laid off permanently.

== Clout on Wheels, Chicago Sun-Times Investigation of the program ==
The Sun-Times investigation began when a reporter, Tim Novak, spotted a red truck parked on the city block where he resides. This single red dump truck bore a sign saying it was leased to the city of Chicago's Hired Truck Program. The reporter eventually staked out a city water crew for five days, watching four Hired Trucks sit idly during each eight-hour shift. Each truck cost taxpayers $50.17 an hour. During these days of investigation, Novak and fellow reporter Steve Warmbir commented that the only excitement these truck drivers experienced was a lunch break to the local McDonald's.

Novak and Warmbir began to research the program, resulting in "Clout on Wheels", a three-part series released by the Sun-Times in January 2004. This on-going series exposed how the city of Chicago spent $40 million a year on privately owned dump trucks. Part one gave detailed information about the program, where part two sparked conversation about ties to organized crime, and part three confronted political ties between the Hired Truck Program and the current political power base.

Between 1996 and 2004, companies in the Hired Truck Program gave more than $800,000 in campaign contributions to various politicians, from House Speaker Michael Madigan to the Governor of Illinois, Rod Blagojevich, to a host of Hispanic politicians. Mayor Richard M. Daley got at least $108,575 and his brother, John Daley, and his ward organization took in more than $47,500 from firms in the Hired Truck Program in the same period.

The scandal eventually sparked a Federal investigation into hiring practices at Chicago City Hall, with Robert Sorich, Mayor Daley's former patronage chief, facing mail fraud charges for allegedly rigging city hiring to favor people with political connections. On July 5, 2006, Sorich, was convicted on two counts of mail fraud for rigging city jobs and promotions. Nick "The Stick" LoCoco was also of prime concern. He was discovered as the city employee whose primary job was to determine which trucks were used for work with the city's transportation department. LoCoco, a well-known mob bookie, was later charged but did not make it to trial because of a fatal horseback riding accident.

== Political fallout ==
Despite the revelations in the Sun-Times, the city defended the program. As the first indictment was unsealed from a sweeping Federal investigation, Chicago City Corporation Counsel Mara Georges said the $40 million-a-year program "is a good program which does a good benefit to the taxpayers of Chicago. It saves taxpayer money. It allows the city to efficiently get jobs done. It is the appropriate use of private resources, as opposed to the city having to engage in its own use of resources."

The scandal was damaging to then-Chicago Mayor Richard M. Daley, whose brother sold insurance to three major trucking companies. Additionally, 25 percent of all Hired Truck money went to companies from Daley's 11th Ward power base, accumulating $47.8 million between 1999 and October 2003. Additionally, $108,575 in campaign contributions flowed to the mayor from companies in the program beginning in 1996.

In February 2005, Daley denied complicity in the unfolding scandal saying, "Anyone who believes that my interest in public life is in enriching my family, friends or political supporters doesn't know or understand me at all. My reputation and the well-being of this city are more important to me than any election."

In February 2006, John Briatta, whose sister is married to Cook County Commissioner John P. Daley, the mayor's brother, pleaded guilty to taking at least $5,400 in bribes to steer Hired Truck work to a trucking company.

The litany of cases of bribery grew to include former City Clerk James Laski, who was charged in January 2006 with taking bribes and obstructing justice after federal agents caught him on tape encouraging witnesses to lie to a grand jury and deny that they had been giving him $500 to $1,000 a week in cash bribes to keep getting business from the Hired Truck program. Laski resigned his $135,545-a-year job and gave up his law license. In March 2006 he pleaded guilty. Laski came into office as a reformer after his predecessor, City Clerk Walter Kozubowski, was convicted in a ghost payroll scheme for paying a total of $476,000 to six "ghosts" for little or no work over a dozen years. Kozubowski was sentenced to five years in prison. In June 2006, Laski was sentenced to two years in prison.

It was also revealed that tons of asphalt paid for by the city were stolen by truck drivers in the Hired Truck program. The asphalt was then used on private jobs.

== See also ==
- Chicago Parking Meters LLC
- Park Grill
