= McCormick Tribune Plaza & Ice Rink =

Multi-purpose venue within Millennium Park in Chicago, Illinois

Coordinates: 41°52′57.68″N 87°37′25.55″W

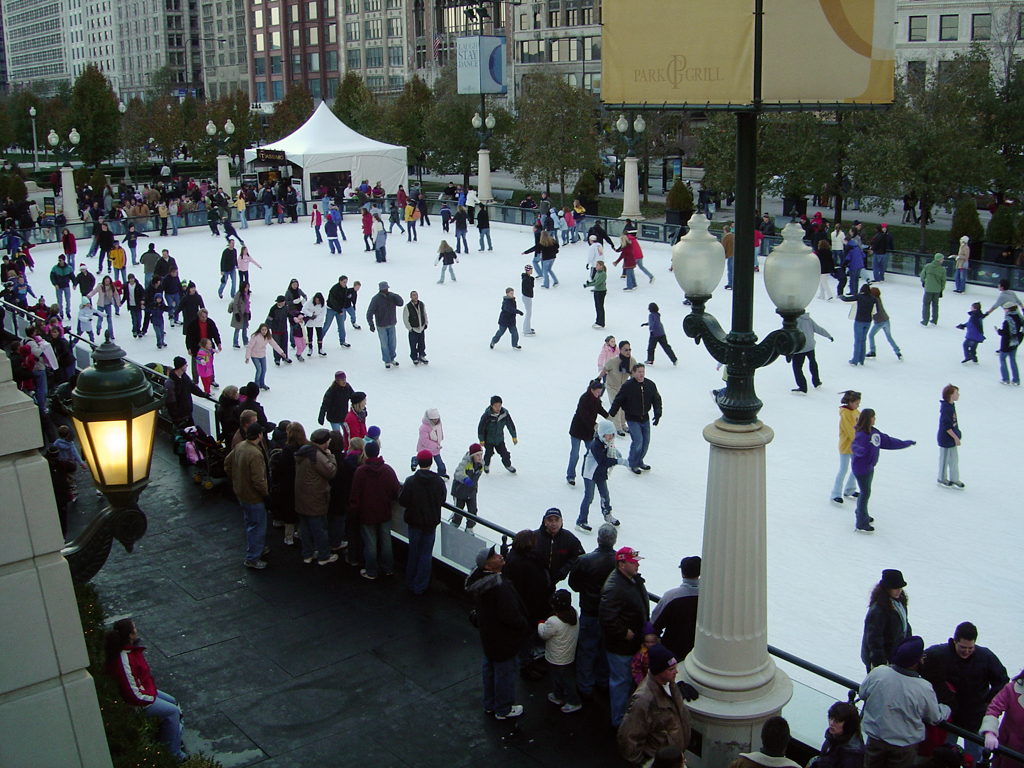
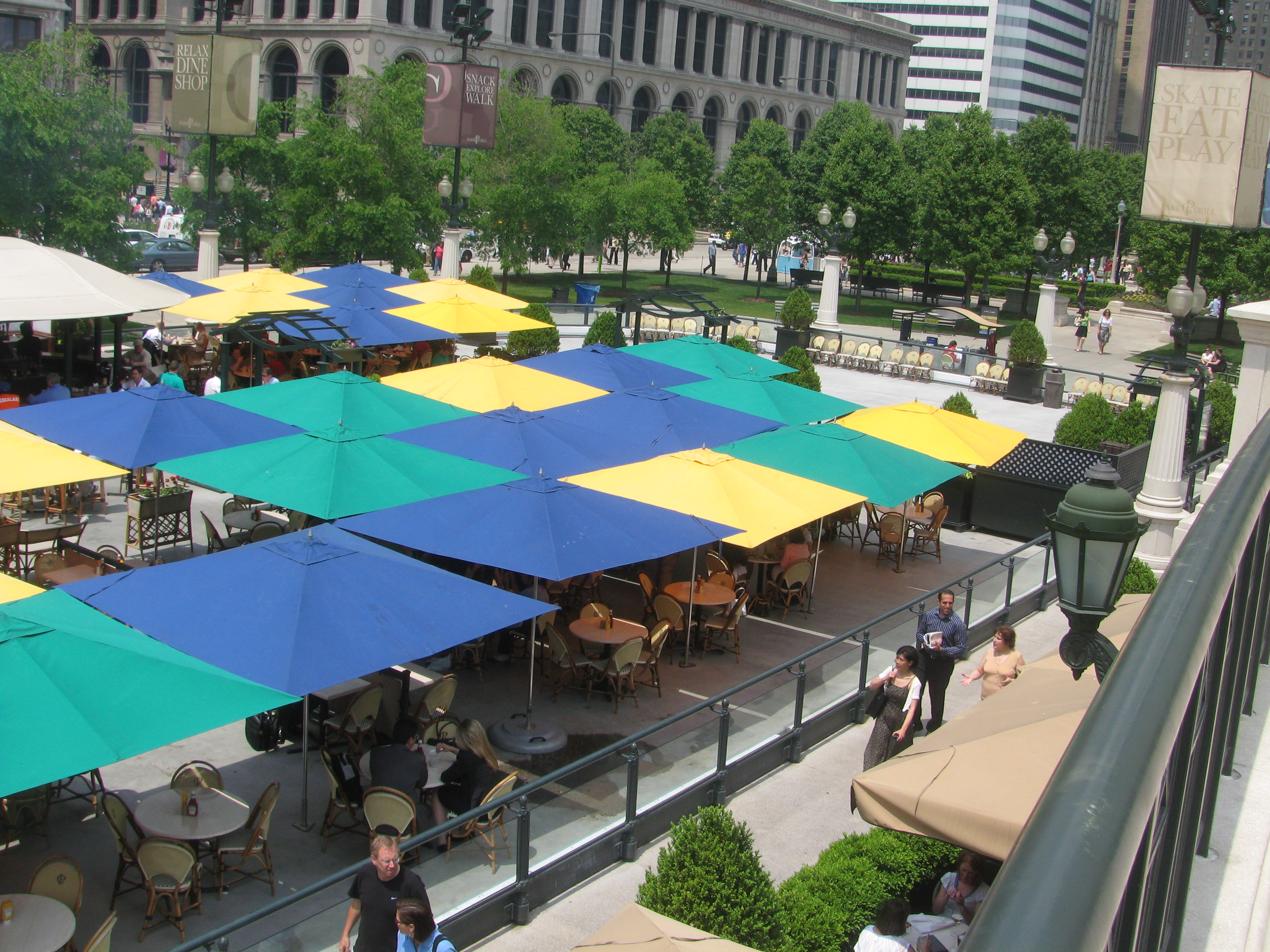
- Ice skating and people-watching (top) view from AT&T Plaza during the summer (bottom)
- Interactive map of McCormick Tribune Plaza & Ice Rink
- Location: 55 N. Michigan Ave, Chicago, Illinois, US
- Owner: City of Chicago
- Capacity: 150 for offseason dining

Construction
- Opened: December 20, 2001
- Cost: $3.2 million
- Architects: OWP&P Architects

Tenants
- Ice Skating Rink; Park Grill

McCormick Tribune Plaza & Ice Rink or McCormick Tribune Plaza is a multi-purpose venue within Millennium Park in the Loop community area of Chicago, Illinois, in the United States. On December 20, 2001, it became the first attraction in Millennium Park to open. The $3.2 million plaza was funded by a donation from the McCormick Tribune Foundation. It has served as an ice skating rink, a dining facility and briefly as an open-air exhibition space.

The plaza operates as McCormick Tribune Ice Rink, a free public outdoor ice skating rink that is generally open four months a year, from mid-November until mid-March, when it hosts over 100,000 skaters annually. It is known as one of Chicago's better outdoor people-watching locations during the winter months. It is operated by the Chicago Department of Cultural Affairs rather than the Chicago Park District, which operates most major public ice skating rinks in Chicago.

For the rest of the year, it serves as Plaza at Park Grill or Park Grill Plaza, Chicago's largest outdoor dining facility. The 150-seat park grill hosts various culinary events as well as music during its months of outdoor operation, and it is affiliated with the 300-seat indoor Park Grill restaurant located beneath AT&T Plaza and Cloud Gate. The outdoor restaurant offers scenic views of the park.

== History ==
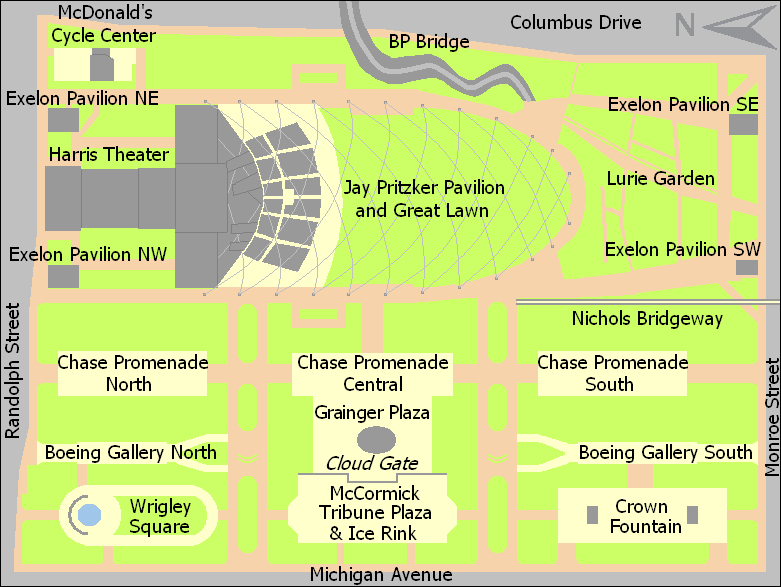
Image map of Millennium Park; east is at the top. Each feature or label is linked.

Lying between Lake Michigan to the east and the Loop to the west, Grant Park has been Chicago's front yard since the mid-19th century. Its northwest corner, north of Monroe Street and the Art Institute, east of Michigan Avenue, south of Randolph Street, and west of Columbus Drive, had been Illinois Central rail yards and parking lots until 1997 when it was made available for development by the city as Millennium Park. As of 2007, Millennium Park, which is located in the northwest corner of Grant Park, trails only Navy Pier as a Chicago tourist attraction.

The earliest plans for Millennium Park were unveiled by Chicago's mayor, Richard M. Daley, in March 1998 and included "a reflecting pool that would double as a skating rink in winter". The architectural firm of Skidmore, Owings & Merrill came up with the master plan for the park; their original design for the ice rink placed it along upper Randolph Street, on the park's northern edge. However, McCormick Tribune Plaza & Ice Rink was built on the western edge of Millennium Park. The Chicago Tribune's Pulitzer Prize-winning architecture critic Blair Kamin called this move "a masterstroke" and praised the new location "where the skaters symbolize the year-round vitality of the city". Kamin noted the location on the east side of Michigan Avenue allowed those at the plaza and ice rink to enjoy the skyline of the Historic Michigan Boulevard District. Another addition to the plaza and rink's design was the 300-seat restaurant; the final architectural design was completed by OWP&P Architects, who were also the architects for the adjoining Wrigley Square.

Although the rink was budgeted for $5 million, it was constructed for only $3.2 million ($5.8 million today), making it one of the few Millennium Park attractions to cost less than was initially budgeted. The rink was funded by and named for the McCormick Tribune Foundation, which was established by former Chicago Tribune owner and publisher Robert R. McCormick. The McCormick Tribune Foundation is a supporter of the McCormick Tribune Freedom Museum and the McCormick Tribune Campus Center at the Illinois Institute of Technology, both of which are also located in Chicago.

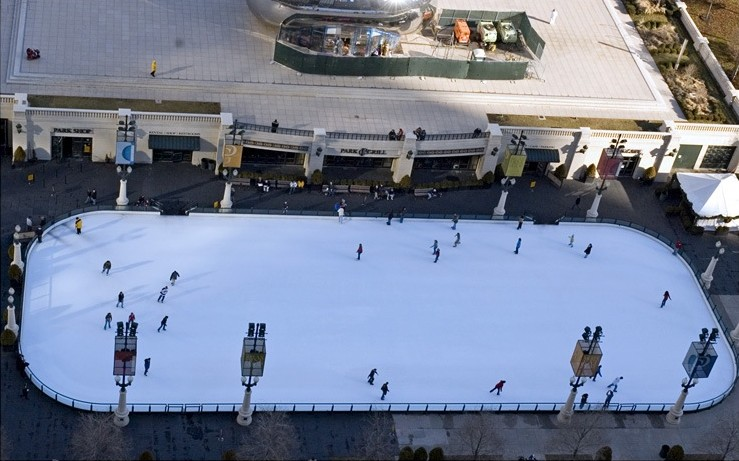
McCormick Tribune Plaza Ice Rink and AT&T Plaza with the Cloud Gate

McCormick Tribune Plaza & Ice Rink was the first feature in Millennium Park to open. Its grand opening was celebrated on December 20, 2001, a few weeks ahead of the Millennium Park underground parking garage. Mayor Daley, McCormick Tribune Foundation Chairman of the Board John W. Madigan, Millennium Park private donor group chief John Bryan, actress Bonnie Hunt and other local celebrities attended the event. The new ice rink was seen as a replacement for "Skate on State", a public skating rink on State Street in the Loop which closed in 2001.

From June 21 to September 15, 2002, McCormick Tribune Plaza hosted the inaugural exhibit in Millennium Park, Exelon Presents Earth From Above by Yann Arthus-Bertrand, a French aerial photographer. Arthus-Bertrand used planes and helicopters to photograph sites in over 60 countries on every continent, and displayed more than 120 of these photographs in dozens of cities, starting in Paris and including Tokyo and Geneva. In the summer of 2002, the book associated with the exhibit had sold over 1.5 million copies, and the photographs were displayed in Brazil, Lebanon, Poland, Sweden, Germany, Britain, Norway, Hungary and along the banks of the Volga River in Russia.

Chicago was the first American city to host the Earth From Above exhibition. The exhibit featured 4-by-6-foot (1.2 m × 1.8 m) photographic prints that were laminated onto thin 5-by-7.5-foot (1.5 m × 2.3 m) aluminum panels that protected them from ultraviolet rays. The photographs included scenes of natural beauty such as a Filipino Bajau village built on coral reefs, a formation of rocks in Madagascar, an inlet in the Ionian Islands that is home to endangered sea turtles, and architectural highlights such as the Palace of Versailles and the Hagia Sophia in Istanbul. It also showed scenes of tragedy such as the 1999 earthquake in Turkey and the destruction of the Amazon rainforest. The exhibit used photovoltaic solar panels to store electrical energy during the day that then lit the exhibit at night.

Part of the 2006 film The Weather Man, starring Nicolas Cage, was shot at the rink. In 2008, Millennium Park hosted a winter celebration called the Museum of Modern Ice. The installation included a 95-by-12-foot (29.0 m × 3.7 m) ice wall in the park and a large abstract painting by Gordon Halloran, which was embedded in the McCormick Tribune Ice Rink. The works were titled Paintings Below Zero. In 2008–2009 the logo for the unsuccessful Chicago bid for the 2016 Summer Olympics was displayed in the rink's ice.

The ice rink served as the "headquarters" for the 2011 edition of Hockey Weekend Across America; the NHL on NBC broadcast its studio coverage from the rink on February 20 of that year. Eddie Olczyk opened the show by skating with the Stanley Cup in the Millennium Park rink.

== Details ==
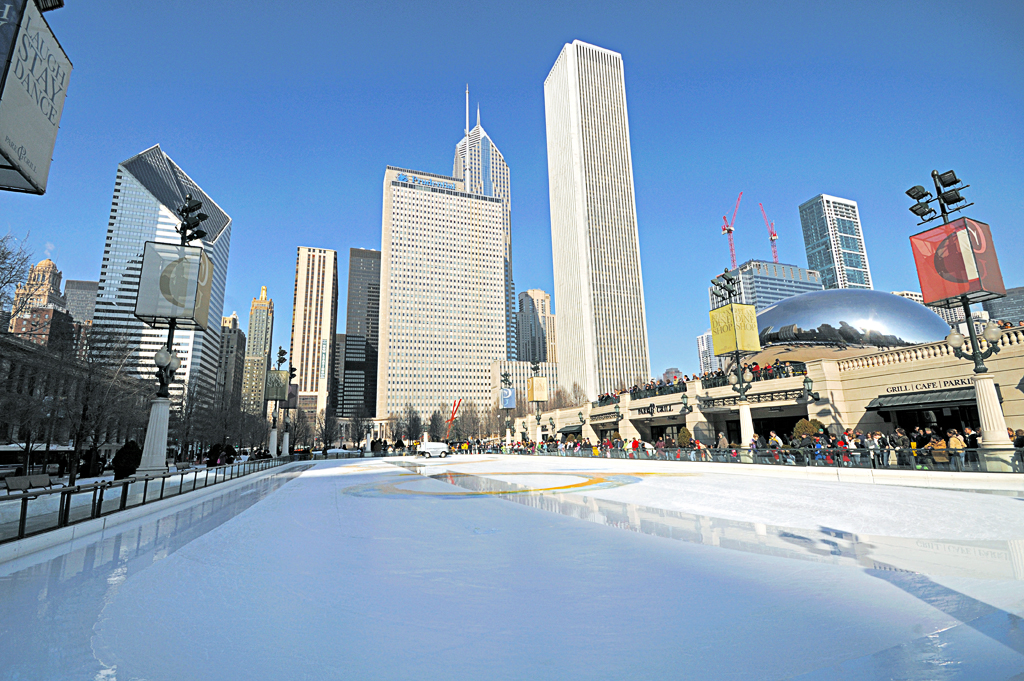
Viewed from the south end of the rink

The ice skating rink at McCormick Tribune Plaza is 200 by 80 feet (61 by 24 m). Due to the rink's rounded corners, the total skating surface is 15,910 square feet (1,478 m^{2}), which critic Blair Kamin called "amply sized". For comparison, this is a considerably larger skating surface than the Rockefeller Center rink in New York City, which is 120 by 60 feet (37 by 18 m).

The Millennium Park rink has a lobby which provides skaters a respite from the natural environs, as well as toilets and public lockers. During the 2003–04 season the rink rented 77,667 pairs of ice skates. By 2009–2010, its ninth season, it was attracting more than 100,000 skaters a year. While availability of the rink depends on the weather, it also has a state-of-the-art chiller system that can maintain the ice in the event of unseasonably warm weather. Thus, temperature is not the only factor involved in decisions to close the rink. In his review of the plaza and rink, Kamin gave it two stars (out of a possible four), called the structure "solid, though unremarkable", and praised its uses throughout the year.

When the rink is closed, its surface becomes a 150-seat cafe that complements the 300-seat indoor Park Grill dining facility. Street level features such as McCormick Tribune Plaza are linked to elevated features such as Cloud Gate and AT&T Plaza, which are atop the Park Grill Restaurant and can be reached via balustraded stairs.

== Operations ==
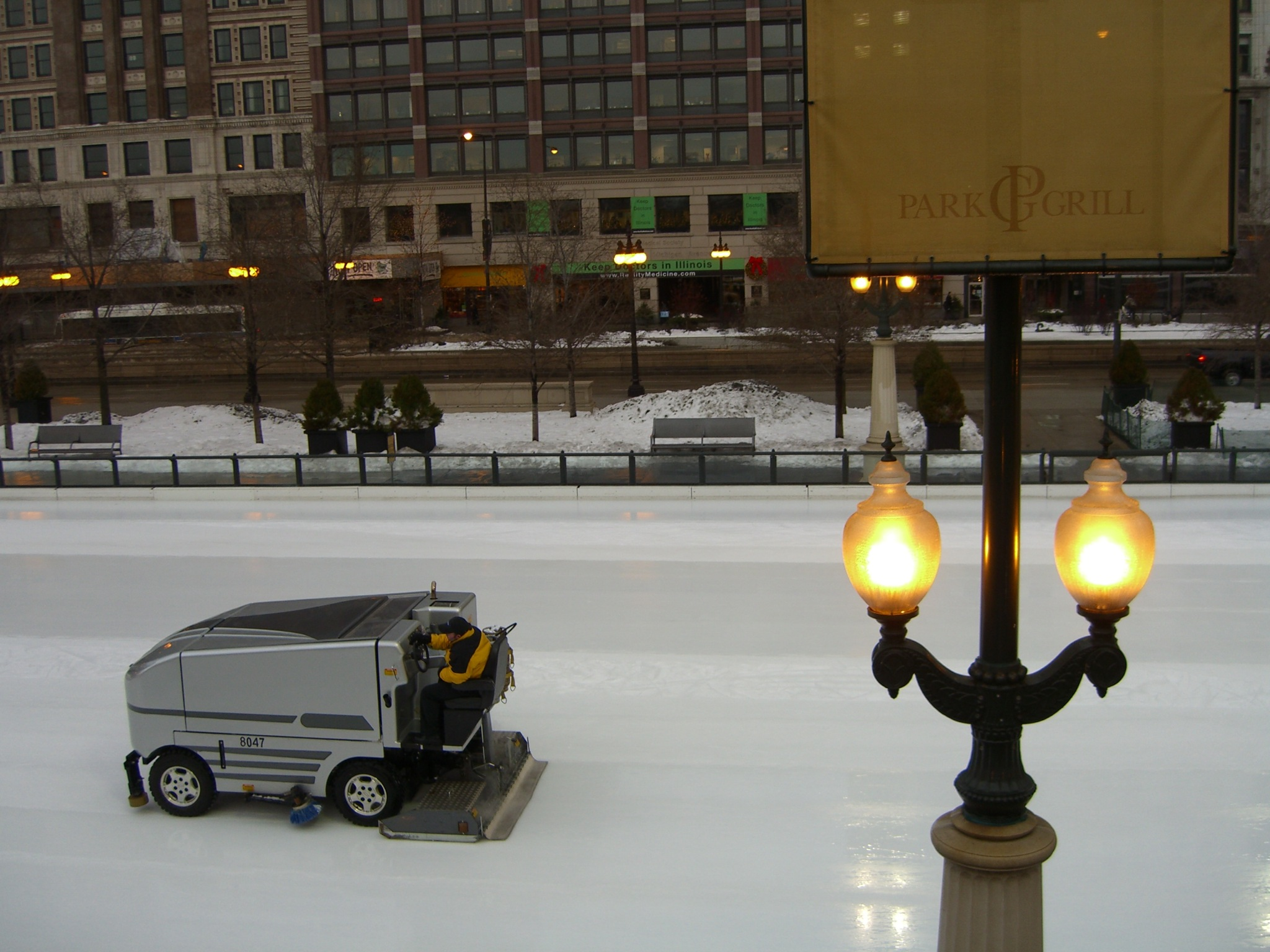
The McCormick Tribune Zamboni operates every two hours.

Through 2006 and 2007, the McCormick Tribune Ice Rink was one of several operated by the Chicago Park District. Since then, although the Chicago Park District still operates ten public ice skating rinks, the Millennium Park ice rink is operated by a division of the Chicago Department of Cultural Affairs, itself a Department of the City of Chicago Government.

=== Ice rink ===
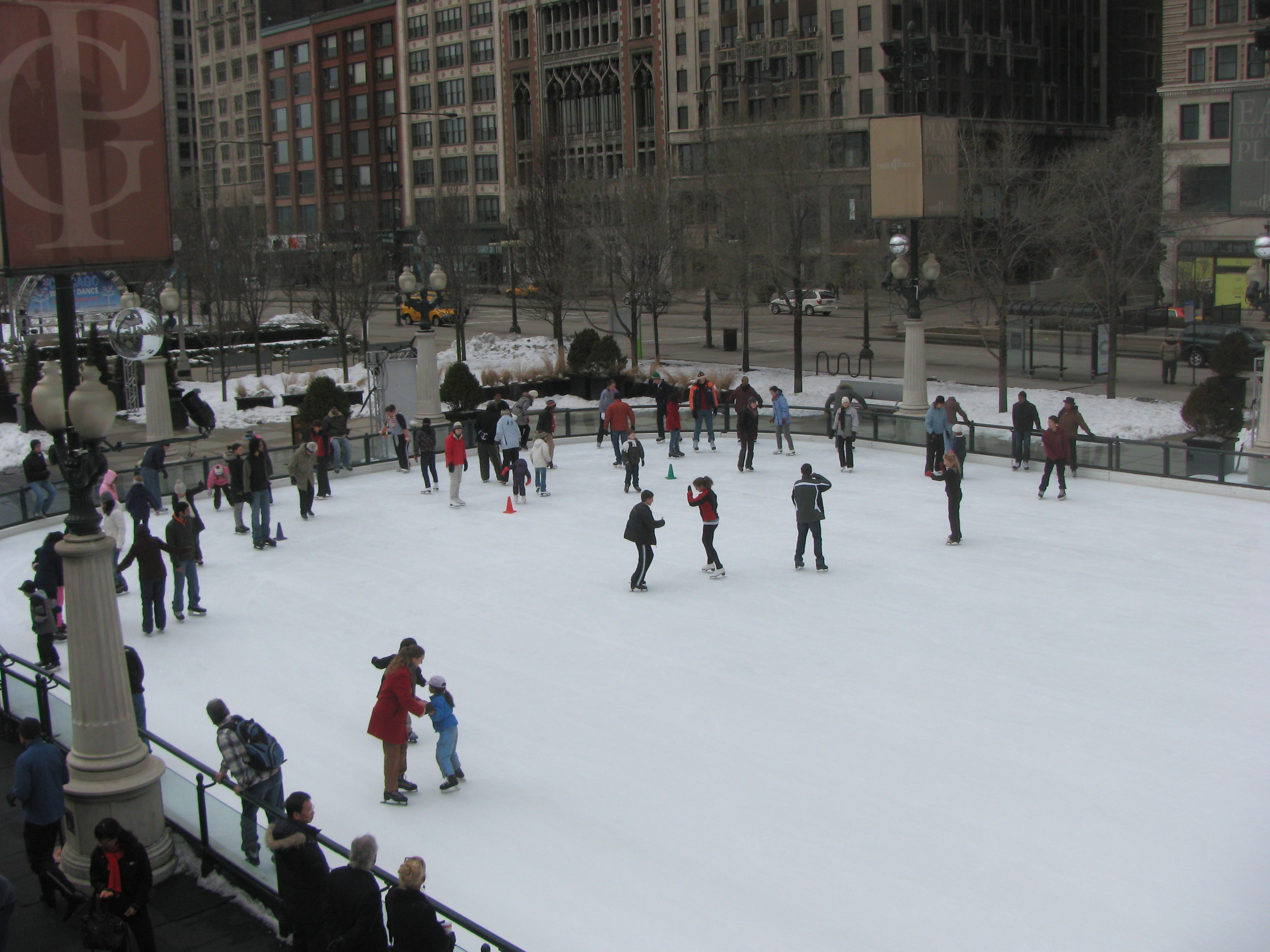
February 2010 Chicago Winter Dance

McCormick Tribune Ice Rink is generally open for skating afternoons and evenings seven days a week, with longer hours on weekends. However, it is occasionally closed for private events. Skating is free and skate rental is available. Except for its first year, the rink has been scheduled to be open from mid-November until mid-March, weather permitting. For the 2009–10 winter season, the rink was scheduled to be open from November 20, 2009 to March 14, 2010, with abbreviated holiday schedules on Thanksgiving, Christmas Eve, Christmas Day and New Year's Eve. Skating is accompanied by loudspeaker music, which is mostly seasonal music during the holidays.

Rink attendance is heavier on the weekends and other times when school is not in session. Romantic holidays such as Christmas Eve and Valentine's Day are also quite crowded. The ice rink is a popular people watching location during the winter months; many view events at the McCormick Tribune Plaza from AT&T Plaza, above and to the east. The ice skating rink has become so popular that when the weather was too warm for the rink's opening in November 2005, the story became international news. The book 1,000 Places to See in the U.S.A. & Canada Before You Die suggests a visit to McCormick Tribune Plaza during the skating season, and describes Millennium Park as a renowned attraction.

There are days when themed skating is encouraged. Santa attire was encouraged on Saturday, December 13, 2008, and zombie attire was encouraged the next day, as part of an attempt to set a Guinness World Record for number of zombies on ice. The rink also serves as a host to the annual Chicago Winter Dance Festival; during the festival there is a month of free skating instruction and demonstration at the rink, and there is free dance instructions behind the glass doors of the Jay Pritzker Pavilion stage.

=== Park Grill Plaza ===
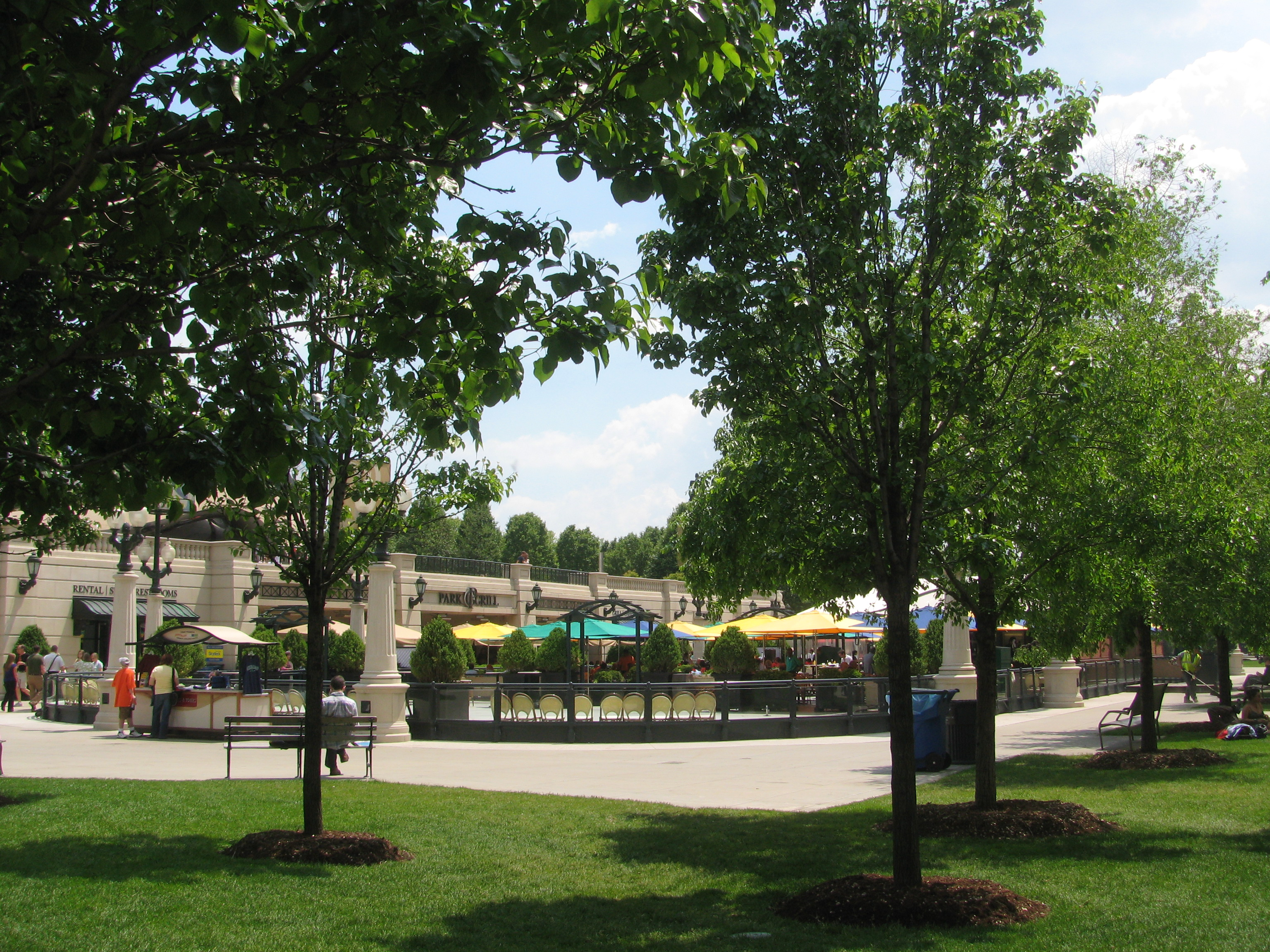
Viewed from the northwest during the summer

During much of the offseason alfresco dining is available in a 150-seat cafe set up on the ice rink, in what is then referred to as the Park Grill Plaza. This outdoor dining experience is associated with the Park Grill Restaurant and the Park Grill Cafe, which are both located under the Cloud Gate on AT&T Plaza. Architecture critic Blair Kamin compares the in-park eating options availed at the Park Grill with New York's former Tavern on the Green and Chicago's Cafe Brauer. The Park Grill Plaza is the largest outdoor dining venue in Chicago, and hosts a variety of events, including a benefit called "Chefs on the Grill" in which guests interact with invited chefs who are competing to produce the best dish. Wine tastings are also hosted there, and during the summer, the Park Grill Plaza hosts musical performances on Thursdays. During the skating season, there are rinkside tables and the Park Grill Cafe offers take out and to-go service. Outdoor dining service begins in May.

McCormick Tribune Plaza & Ice Rink is one of two features in the park to include accessible restrooms; the other is Jay Pritzker Pavilion. The restrooms are located adjacent to the Park Grill. Although McCormick Plaza is a winter focal point, the park's restroom facilities at this feature are not heated for winter use.

According to Fodor's, the restaurant is known for a view that makes up for unimpressive service. However, Citysearch speaks positively about the service. Metromix, Fodor's and Frommer's all laud the location of the restaurant, which serves New American cuisine. Frommer's gives the restaurant 2 out of 3 stars and notes that the restaurant has a kids menu to accommodate the numerous families that visit the park. Metromix notes that the restaurant is well known for its signature Park Grill Burger. The northern area of the Plaza has been named the North Lounge and has furniture for lounging; it has a distinct menu including options from the Plaza's menu, as well as its own offerings. The indoor restaurant has seating for 300, a VIP room, and serves dinner, lunch, and weekend brunch.

== See also ==
- Maggie Daley Park ice skating ribbon
