= Grainger Plaza =

Public space at Millennium Park, Chicago

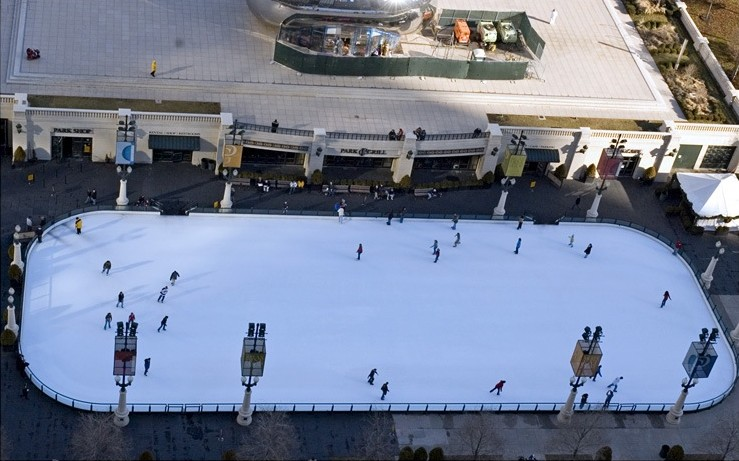
- Plaza with Cloud Gate behind McCormick Tribune Plaza & Ice Rink

- Location within the Chicago Loop area
- Former names: SBC Plaza, Ameritech Plaza
- Location: 55 N. Michigan Ave; Chicago, Illinois
- Coordinates: 41°52′57.72″N 87°37′23.88″W
- Owner: City of Chicago
- Surface: Concrete

Construction
- Opened: July 16, 2004

Tenant
- Cloud Gate

Grainger Plaza (formerly AT&T Plaza, Ameritech Plaza and SBC Plaza) is a public space that hosts the Cloud Gate sculpture. It is located in Millennium Park, which is a park built to celebrate the third millennium and which is located within the Loop community area of Chicago, Illinois in the United States. The sculpture and the plaza are sometimes jointly referred to as Cloud Gate on the AT&T Plaza.

It was opened in the summer of 2004 with the initial unveiling of the sculpture during the grand opening weekend of the park. Ameritech Corporation/SBC Communications Inc. donated US$3 million for the naming right to the space. The plaza has become a place to view the McCormick Tribune Plaza & Ice Rink and during the Christmas holiday season, the Plaza hosts Christmas caroling.

== Details ==
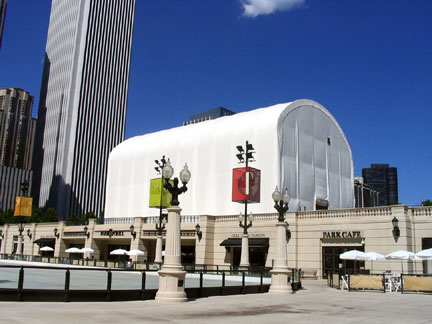
A tent was erected on AT&T Plaza to cover Cloud Gate while it was being polished.

Lying between Lake Michigan to the east and the Loop to the west, Grant Park has been Chicago's front yard since the mid-19th century. Its northwest corner, north of Monroe Street and the Art Institute, east of Michigan Avenue, south of Randolph Street, and west of Columbus Drive, had been Illinois Central rail yards and parking lots until 1997, when it was made available for development by the city as Millennium Park. Today, Millennium Park trails only Navy Pier as a Chicago tourist attraction.

The plaza is located above Park Grill, above and behind the McCormick Tribune Plaza & Ice Rink, adjacent to the Chase Promenade, and between the North and South Boeing Galleries. The plaza and the Cloud Gate sculpture sit atop the 300-seat $6 million Park Grill, which opened in November 2003 behind the McCormick Tribune Plaza & Ice Rink. The surface of the plaza is concrete. The plaza is composed of 25,200 square feet (2,340 m^{2}) of concrete pavers. Each paver is 30 by 30 inches (76 by 76 cm), and each is 2.5 inches (6.4 cm) thick.

== History ==
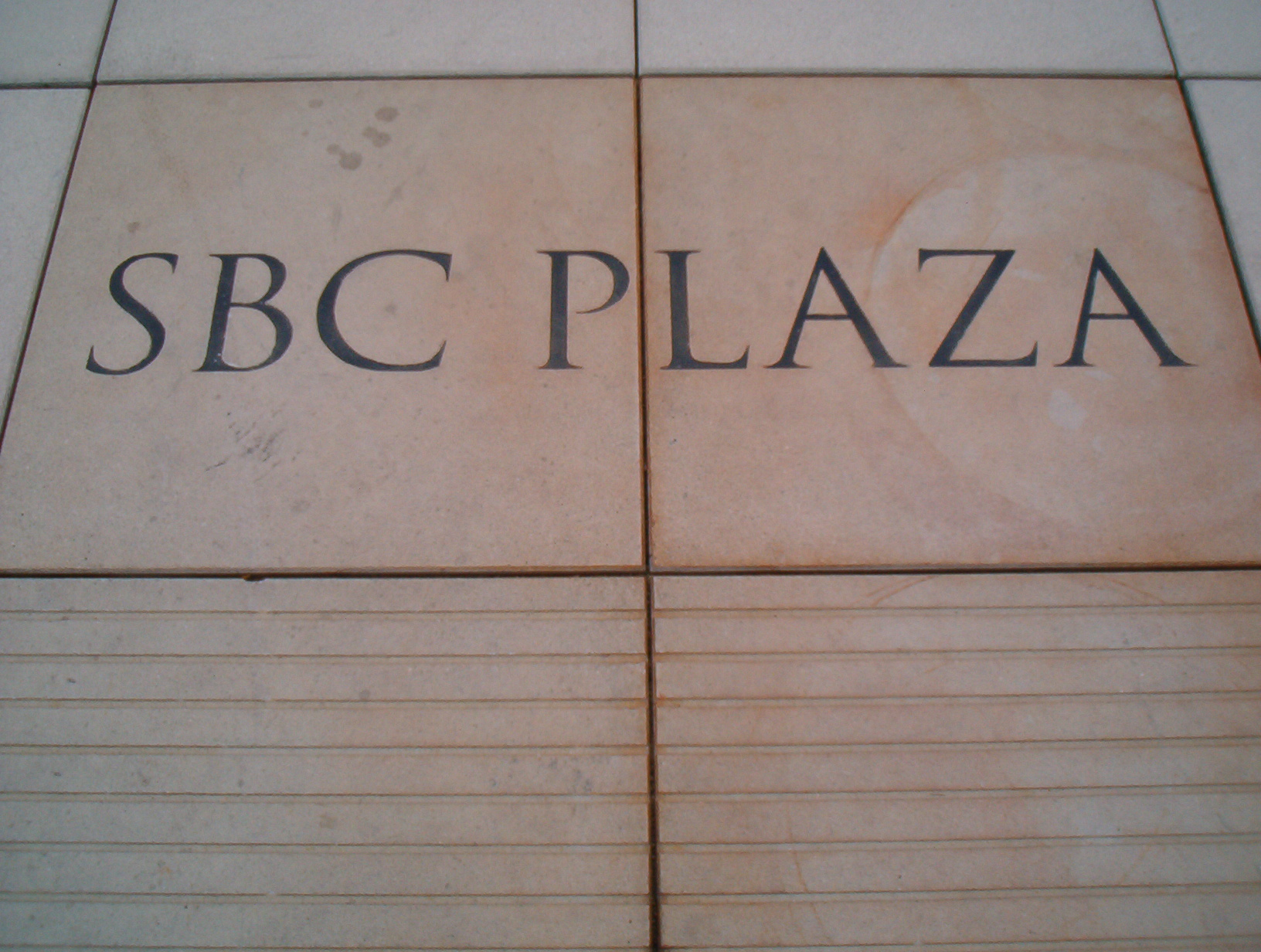
Pavers engraved with the Plaza's former name, SBC Plaza

The plaza was originally named Ameritech Plaza for Ameritech Corporation, the corporate sponsor, who donated $3 million for the sculpture-hosting plaza's naming rights. By the time the park officially opened in 2004, Ameritech had merged with SBC Communications and the plaza was called SBC Plaza. When SBC acquired AT&T and subsequently changed the name from SBC to AT&T in 2005, the name of the plaza changed again.

Cloud Gate was originally estimated to weigh 60 short tons (54.4 t; 53.6 long tons) because it was impossible to estimate the thickness of the steel compatible with the desired aesthetics. The final piece, however, weighs 110 short tons (99.8 t; 98.2 long tons) and care had to be taken in supporting it. The roof of the Park Grill, upon which Cloud Gate sits, had to be strong enough to bear the weight. A large retaining wall separating Chicago's Metra train tracks from the North Grant Park garage travels along the back side of the restaurant and supports much of the sculpture's weight. This wall, along with the rest of the garage's foundation, required additional bracing before the piece was erected. In June 2004, when construction of the shell began, a large tent (pictured left) was erected around the piece in order to shield it from public view.

== Activities ==
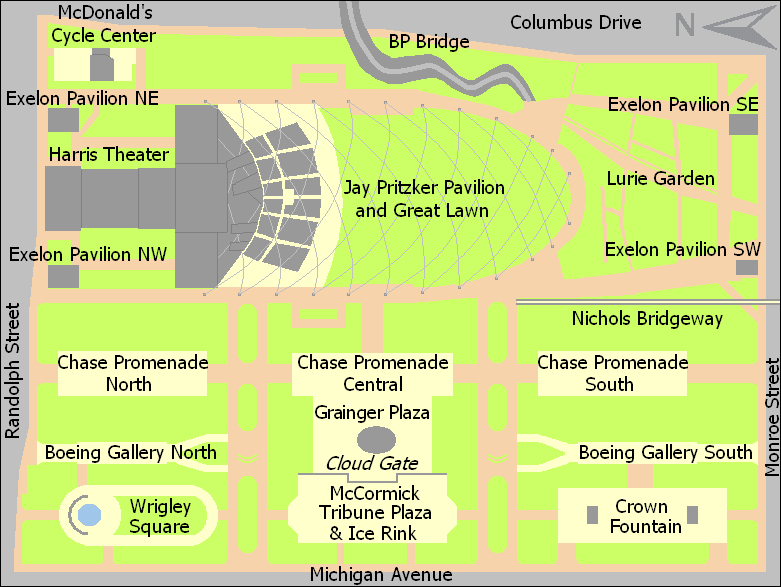
Image map of Millennium Park; east is at the top. Each feature or label is linked.

In 2006, annual Christmas caroling began at the plaza. Following Thanksgiving, weekly sing-alongs are led by choral groups including Bella Voce, Chicago Mass Choir, and Chicago Children's Choir.

Because of its elevation above the McCormick Tribune Plaza & Ice Rink, the plaza has become a prime viewing location for jazz concerts held during the summer at the McCormick Tribune Plaza. McCormick Tribune Plaza is located below and to the west of AT&T Plaza as well as adjacent to Michigan Avenue's Historic Michigan Boulevard District, which are slightly further west.
