= Nicole Ex =

Dutch art historian

- Born: Breda, Netherlands
- Education: Vrije Universiteit Amsterdam
- Occupations: Art historian, writer, editor-in-chief
- Known for: Writing; founding editor-in-chief of See All This Art Magazine

Nicole Ex is a Dutch art historian, writer, and the founding editor-in-chief of See All This Art Magazine.

== Life and work ==
Ex studied Art history at Vrije Universiteit Amsterdam, where she specialised in the theory of art conservation. Her thesis on the ethics of restoration was published in 1993 by the Dutch publishing house Amber under the title Zo goed als oud (English: As Good As Old).

Before founding See All This, Ex worked as an editor for the Dutch cultural magazine Hollands Diep. She has written on topics related to history of art and motherhood.

== See All This Art Magazine ==
In late 2015, Ex founded See All This, a quarterly art magazine and online platform that explores themes of beauty, art, and nature. The first issue had a print run of 20,000 copies, including 5,000 English-language editions, making it the largest art magazine in the Netherlands at the time.

During her tenure at See All This, Ex has collaborated with various artists and curators, including Iwan Baan, Claudy Jongstra, Piet Oudolf, Bijoy Jain, Lidewij Edelkoort, David Whyte, Mory Sacko, and Marlene Dumas.

Alongside Catherine de Zegher, Ex curated the Pretty Brilliant Women in the Arts edition of See All This, produced over five years.

== Pretty Brilliant Women in the Arts ==
Pretty Brilliant Women in the Arts is a three-volume bilingual series published between 2020 and 2025. Inspired by the canonical History of Art by H. W. Janson, whose early editions excluded women artists, Ex, Catherine de Zegher, and Sarah Knigge developed the series as an anthology consisting exclusively of works by female artists.

The project stemmed from Ex’s observation that “we’re looking at the history of art with one eye closed”. The anthology aims to address gender imbalance in art history by highlighting the contributions of women artists.

The initiative contributed to renewed attention for artists such as Charley Toorop, Lou Loeber, and Lotti van der Gaag.

== BREAKING-de-week ==
Since 2020, Ex has written a weekly Wednesday art newsletter titled BREAKING-de-week (English: BREAKING-the-week). In 2024, selected columns were compiled into the book De titel is een zinnetje (English: The Title Is a Sentence), published by De Bezige Bij.
