= Matrix planting =

Naturalistic planting design technique

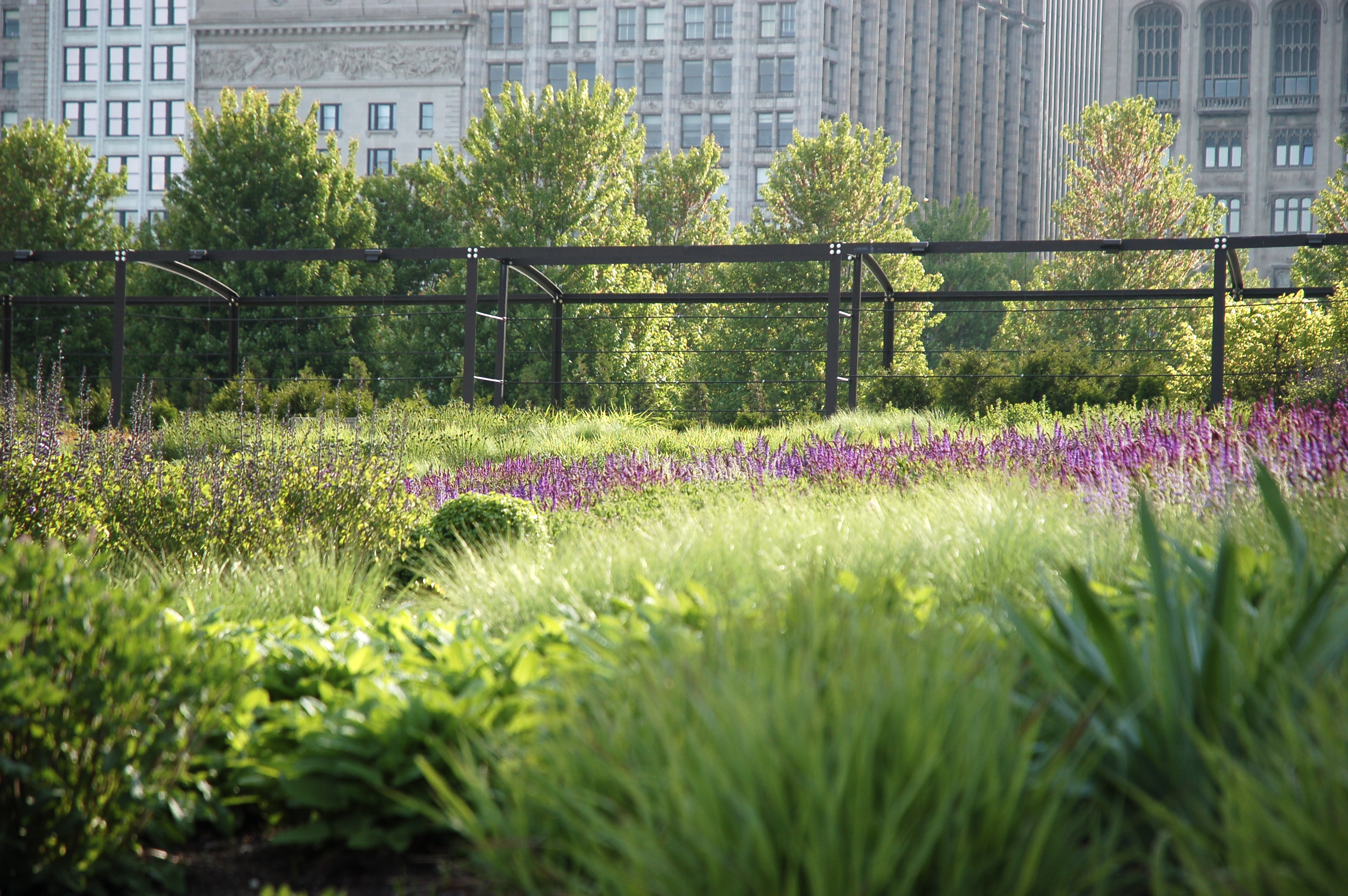
Perennial and grass plantings at the Lurie Garden in Chicago, designed by Piet Oudolf

Matrix planting is an approach to planting design in which a continuous groundcover layer of one or a few species, usually grasses or sedges, forms a "matrix" into which structural and seasonal plants are set. The matrix layer covers the soil surface and binds the planting together, leaving little open ground for weeds. The technique is associated with naturalistic and ecological planting design and with Piet Oudolf's New Perennial Movement.

The term has been used in more than one sense. In The Self-Sustaining Garden (1997), British plantsman Peter Thompson used "matrix planting" for the integration of all layers of vegetation into a self-sustaining whole in which closely fitted plants exclude weeds. Later literature narrows the meaning, treating the matrix as one specific layer within a designed plant community rather than the whole planting.

== Concept ==
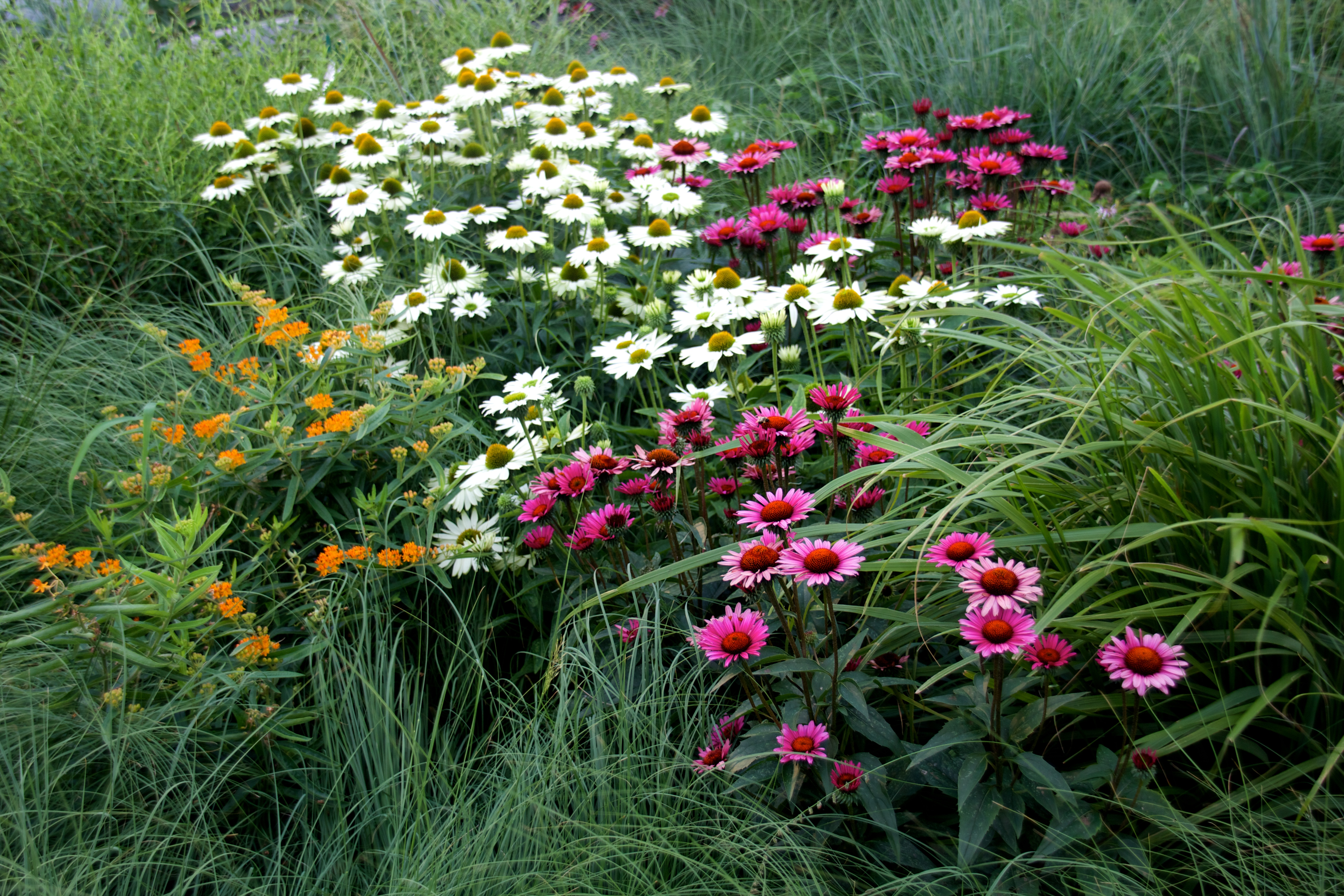
Perennials such as coneflowers (Echinacea) set into a matrix of grasses on the High Line in New York

The practice of growing ornamental perennials in a continuous, grass-like "sward" has antecedents in the medieval "flowery mead".

In its modern usage, matrix planting arranges vegetation in vertical layers. Groundcover occupies the first layer; taller structural plants and seasonal flowering plants are then set into it. Oudolf and Noël Kingsbury compared the result to a fruitcake, in which the matrix is the cake and the more conspicuous plants are the fruit and nuts distributed through it. Rainer and West describe a layered model in which a structural layer, a seasonal theme layer, a groundcover matrix layer and a dynamic filler layer together form what they call a "designed plant community".

The matrix layer is often built from Carex sedges or from shallow-rooted grasses, because they cover the ground without overwhelming the plants set among them. In contrast, Thompson stresses the interlocking of all layers of vegetation, drawing an analogy with the filtered light and layered growth of deciduous forest.

== Examples ==
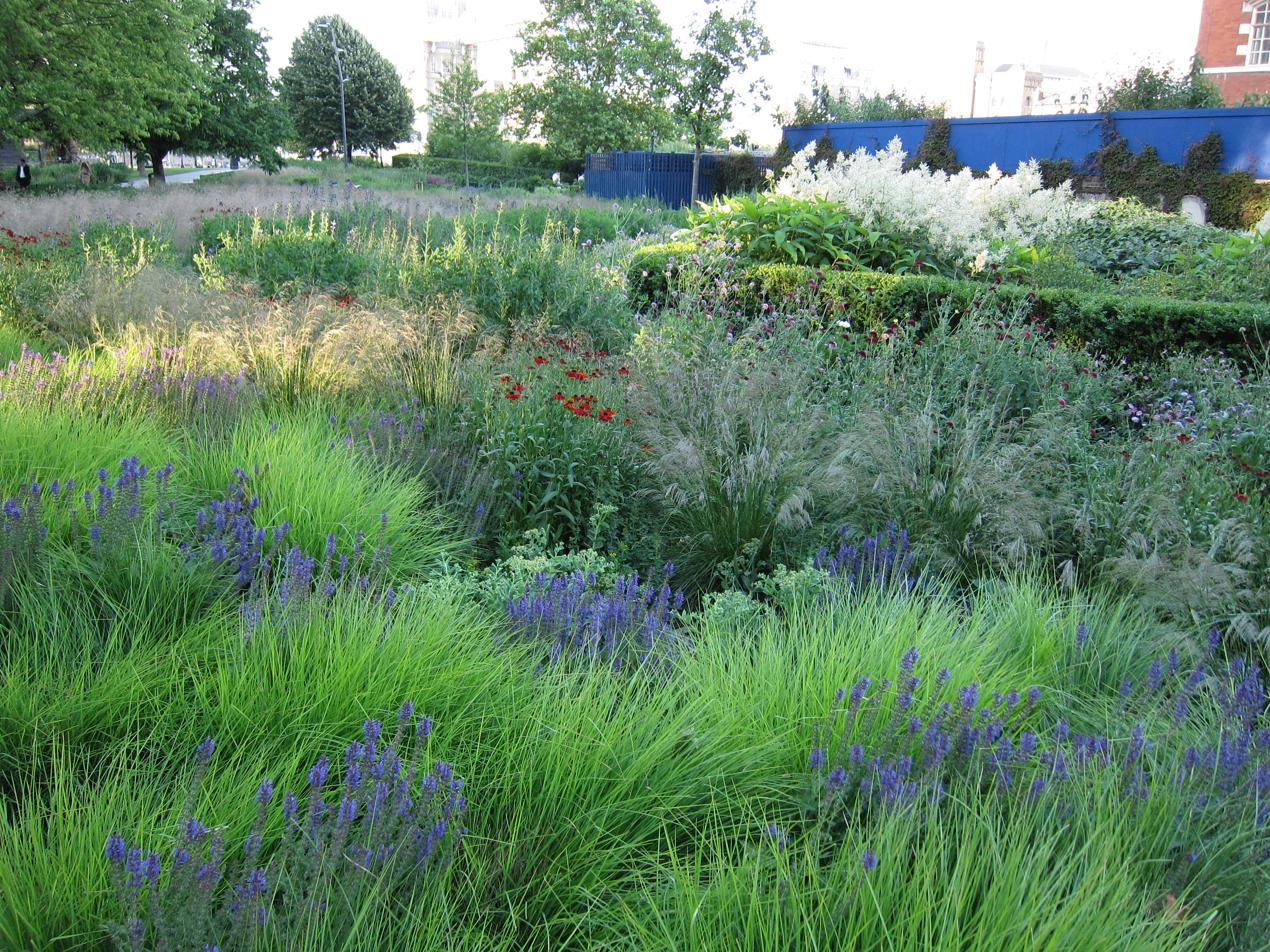
Naturalistic planting by Piet Oudolf at Potters Fields Park in London

Matrix and layered naturalistic planting have been used in several public plantings. Oudolf's plans for the High Line in New York, Potters Fields Park in London and the gardens at Trentham are documented in his Planting: A New Perspective monograph. Hitchmough's seed-sown meadow technique, described in Sowing Beauty, was applied at the 2012 London Olympic Park, which Alizadeh and Hitchmough cite as a leading example of designed multi-layer plant communities. The Lurie Garden in Chicago's Millennium Park, designed by Oudolf with plants supplied by Roy Diblik, is another American example.
