= See All This Art Magazine =

Dutch art magazine

- Categories: Art magazine
- Frequency: Quarterly
- Publisher: See All This
- Founder: Nicole Ex
- Founded: 2015
- First issue: Winter 2015/2016
- Country: The Netherlands
- Based in: Amsterdam
- Language: English, Dutch
- Website: seeallthis.com/en/
- ISSN: 2468-8886

See All This Art Magazine is a quarterly print magazine and online platform founded in 2015 in The Netherlands by the writer and art historian Nicole Ex.

Twice a year, See All This invites a collaborator to curate a thematic issue, among them Marlene Dumas, Mory Sacko, David Whyte, Lidewij Edelkoort, Bijoy Jain, Piet Oudolf, Iwan Baan, and Claudy Jongstra.

== History ==
See All This originated to create an independent platform directly connecting Dutch art institutions, museums and their collections with national and later international audiences.

Upon its launch in the Winter of 2015/2016, See All This partnered with 17 Dutch museums and published its first publication including an interview with Roni Horn and a studio visit of Edmund de Waal. The issue was printed in a run of twenty thousand copies, of which five thousand were in English. This made See All This the largest art magazine in the Netherlands.

== Pretty Brilliant Women in The Arts ==
Launched in 2019 by the founding editor and editor-in-chief of See All This Nicole Ex, Pretty Brilliant is an initiative aiming to highlight the work of women artists. Developed in response to History of Art by H. W. Janson, the first print of which contained no women, over the years See All This published an anthology of works by female artists consisting in as many pages as Janson's text.

379 Pretty Brilliant Women in the Arts published in 2020 and curated by Catherine de Zegher was the first issue of the Pretty Brilliant series. The first print of the issue featuring artists like France-Lise McGurn, Nil Yalter, and Etel Adnan sold out quickly and the edition was commissioned for a reprint.

In 2022 See All This launched Pretty Brilliant Women in the Arts, vol. II. The second issue was dedicated to female artists who "explored alternative ways of living and sought forms of expression outside centers of power." Once more curated by Catherine de Zegher, the edition themed around the elements earth, water, fire, and air with artists like Charley Toorop, Lou Loeber, and Rina Banerjee.

The final volume of Pretty Brilliant themed Godessess and published in 2025 with more and less known female artists from each of the continents. Focusing on women artists in relation to its theme, Goddesses, the issue features written contributions by artists and writers like Cecilia Vicuña and Sutapa Biswas and showcases the works of, among others, Arpita Singh, Lucy Tasseor Tutsweetok and Maria Pinińska-Bereś.

== Awards and recognition ==
- 2025 Silver Mercur for Dutch Media Brand of the Year
- 2026 61st Society of Publication Designers Medal Finalist in Print of the Year and Website of the Year categories

== Magazine issues ==
Issue Number	Date of release	Theme of Issue	Language
1	Winter 2015/2016	The First Winter Issue	Dutch
2	Spring 2016	The First Spring Issue	Dutch
3	Autumn 2016	The First Autumn Issue	Dutch
4	Winter 2016/2017	2016 Review	Dutch
5	Spring 2017	Spring	Dutch
6	Summer 2017	David Hockney	Dutch
7	Autumn 2017	Paris	Dutch
8	Winter 2017/2018	2017 Review & 2018 Highlights	Dutch
9	Spring 2018	Günther Förg	Dutch
10	Summer 2018	Genius Women in the Arts	Dutch
11	Autumn 2018	The Paper Book Issue	Dutch
12	Winter 2018/2019	The Universe Issue	Dutch
13	Spring 2019	The Interview Issue	Dutch
14	Summer 2019	Travelling and coming home	Dutch
15	Autumn 2019	Joost Swarte	Dutch
16	Winter 2019/2020	Paolo Sorrentino	Dutch
17	Spring 2020	The Portrait Issue	Dutch
18	Summer 2020	Love	Dutch
19	Autumn 2020	66 Surprising Exhibitions	Dutch
20	Winter 2020/2021	Pretty Brilliant Women in the Arts vol. I curated by Catherine de Zegher	English & Dutch
21	Spring 2021	Wilderness and wanderlust	Dutch
22	Summer 2021	The most hopeful places on Earth curated by Iwan Baan	English & Dutch
23	Autumn 2021	Lucian Freud	Dutch
24	Winter 2021/2022	Colour fields curated by Claudy Jongstra	English & Dutch
25	Spring 2022	The mind-altering sensations	Dutch
26	Summer 2022	We are all meat: Flesh	English & Dutch
27	Autumn 2022	I see you looking: 50 years of Ways of Seeing by John Berger	Dutch
28	Winter 2022/2023	Pretty Brilliant Women in the Arts vol. II curated by Catherine de Zegher	English & Dutch
29	Spring 2023	The end of time	Dutch
30	Summer 2023	Paradise found curated by Piet Oudolf	English & Dutch
31	Autumn 2023	Micro-dose of art	Dutch
32	Winter 2023/2024	Make yourself a home curated by Bijoy Jain	English & Dutch
33	Spring 2024	Rebirth of the world	Dutch
34	Summer 2024	The Wardrobe as Art collection curated by Lidewij Edelkoort	English & Dutch
35	Autumn 2024	Restoration and conservation	Dutch
36	Winter 2024/2025	To be a pilgrim curated by David Whyte	English & Dutch
37	Spring 2025	Amsterdam 750 birthday issue	Dutch
38	Summer 2025	Pretty Brilliant Women in the Arts vol. III curated by Catherine de Zegher	English & Dutch
39	Autumn 2025	Light	Dutch
40	Winter 2025/2026	Cooking is caring curated by Mory Sacko	English & Dutch
41	Spring 2026	10 year Anniversary issue	Dutch
42	Summer 2026	The Body curated by Marlene Dumas	English & Dutch
