= Mien Ruys =

Dutch landscape and garden architect

- Born: Wilhelmina Jacoba Ruys; 14 February 1904; Dedemsvaart, Netherlands
- Died: 9 January 1999 (aged 94); Dedemsvaart, Netherlands

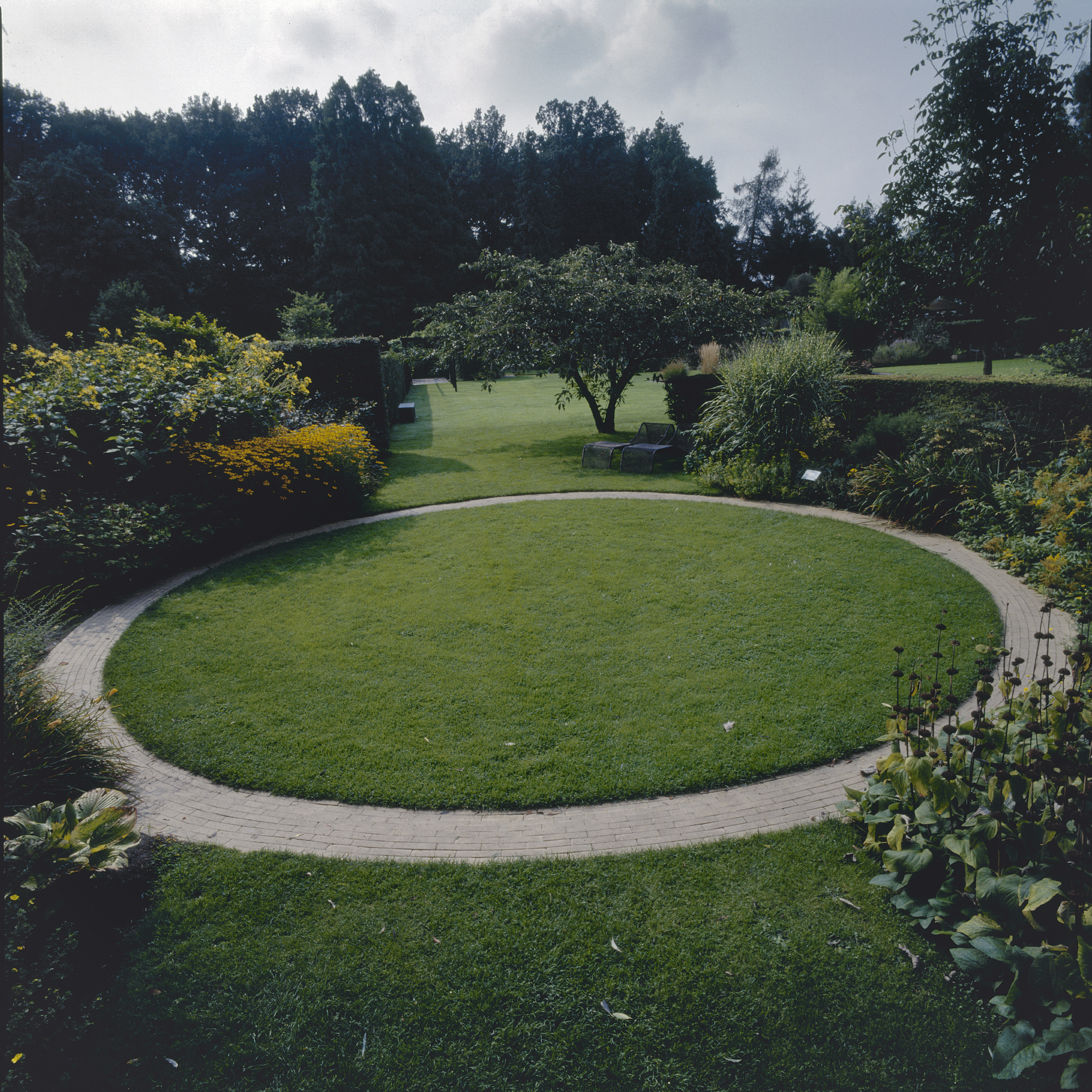
Yellow Garden (Dedemsvaart) by Mien Ruys (1982)

Wilhelmina Jacoba Moussault-Ruys (14 February 1904 – 9 January 1999) was a Dutch landscape and garden architect. Her gardening legacy is maintained in the Dutch town of Dedemsvaart, which is home to the Tuinen Mien Ruys. With people such as Piet Oudolf, she is considered a leader in the "New Perennial Movement."

== Career ==
Mien Ruys briefly studied garden architecture in Berlin in the 1920s, and spent time in England as well (Tunbridge Wells); her father was a friend of Gertrude Jekyll, from whom Ruys is supposed to have learned some things about colour. During World War II she studied engineering in Delft, but then returned home to work and experiment at her father's company. Ruys's father, Bonne Ruys, founded the Moerheim Nursery in 1888 specializing in perennials in the bogs near Dedemsvaart, near Zwolle, in the east of the Netherlands. Ruys's business quickly grew and in the first half of the twentieth century had become the most notable nursery in Europe for perennials. She was the younger sister of Anna Charlotte Ruys.

Beginning in 1924, Mien began experimenting, making small gardens of perennials on her father's land, and soon became as interested in the materials for building gardens as the plants in them. These experiments were the foundation for the Tuinen Mien Ruys and helped her become one of the most notable landscape and garden architects of the Netherlands. Ruys also studied architecture with Marinus Jan Granpré Molière, a noted Dutch architect and landscape planner, and worked with architects such as Gerrit Rietveld, a collaboration which is still celebrated in Bergeijk, where Rietveld designed a factory, Weverij de Ploeg, surrounded by a Ruys-designed park.

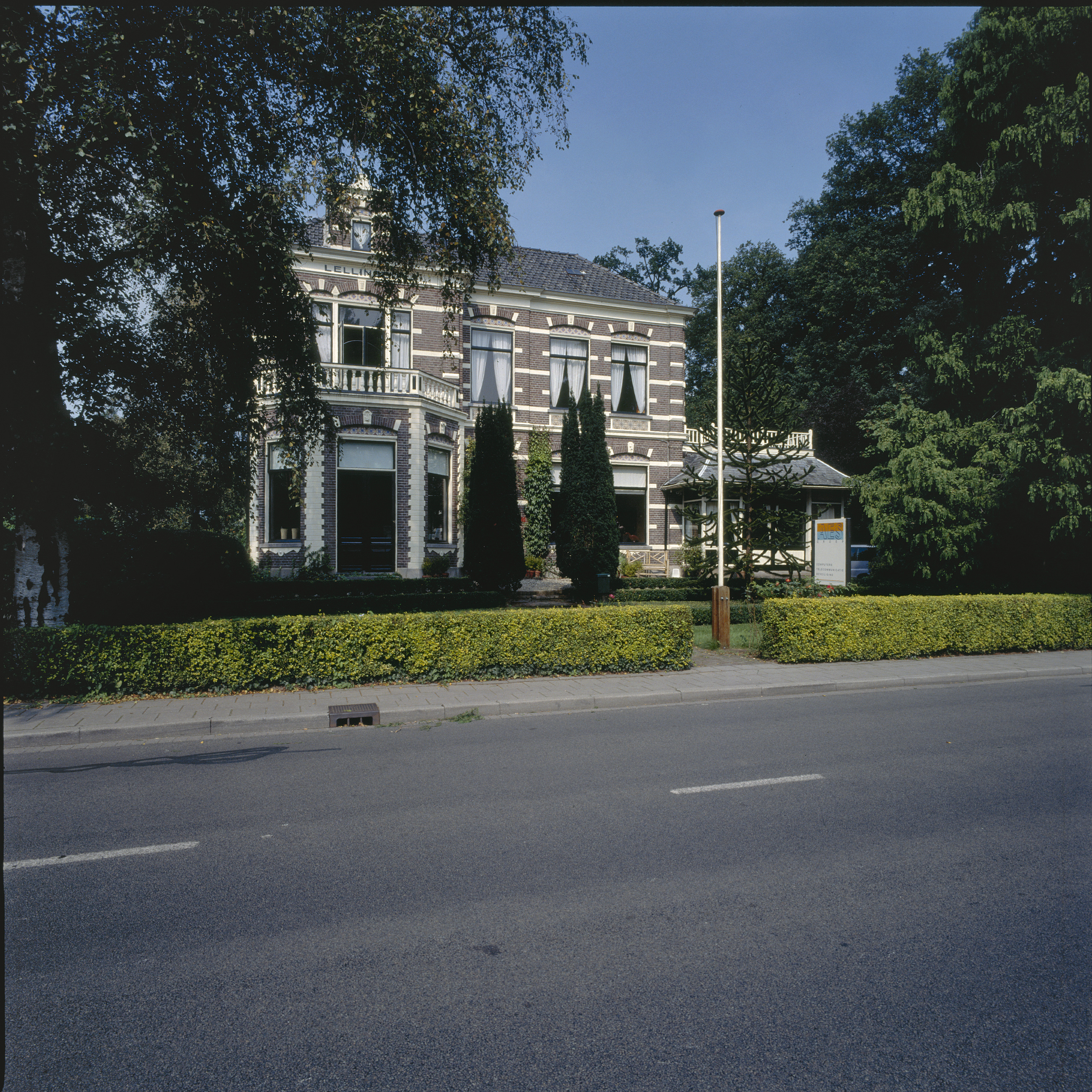
Her home Moerheim House in Dedemsvaart

During World War II, Ruys was active in the Dutch Resistance. In 1983, she was named Righteous Among the Nations by Yad Vashem.

Another notable project of Mien Ruys was her involvement as landscape architect in the design of Nagele. Nagele, a village in the dutch province of Flevoland, was built on the newly constructed Noordoostpolder between 1948 and 1954. Built entirely in a modernist style, the village was designed by De 8 and Opbouw, two architecture associations that profiled themselves as advocates of the so-called Nieuwe Bouwen. Ruys, in collaboration with Wim Boer, designed the green spaces of Nagele, including the surrounding windbreak, central village meadow and cemetery. Having to respond to the flat roofed houses, use of simple squared shapes and straight lines in the urban design, Ruys introduced planting in clean lines creating sightlines through the village. In the central green Ruys specified that the path pattern through this space should arise spontaneously through use and only be hardened afterwards. This idea of ‘desire paths’ or ‘elephant paths’ was radical as it opposes the totality of the top-down modernist master plan.

Ruys became a household name in the Netherlands by publishing a number of books, the best-known of which is Het vaste plantenboek ("Book of perennials"). With her husband, Theo Moussault (a former owner of the Amsterdam weekly De Groene Amsterdammer), she started a quarterly magazine in 1954, Onze eigen tuin ("Our own garden"), which is still considered one of the most creative Dutch publications in this field. The magazine is read in middle- and upper-class circles, and includes "Gardening lessons for suckers." Ruys died in 1999.

== Style and influence ==
Ruys is highly respected; Trouw called her one of the top-10 most influential garden architects of the world. She is responsible for the widespread use in the Netherlands of old railroad ties and gravel tiles, and her style is characterized as "clear, direct, and barren." Influenced by Japanese design and using rectangular spaces, water, bamboo, and wood, Ruys is credited with creating open and transparent spaces even in small gardens.

Her use of railroad ties led to the concept of the bielzentuin (from "biels," the Dutch word for railroad tie): she is nicknamed "Bielzen Mien." The first bielzentuin she made dates from 1956, in the garden of a residential house in Overveen built by Dutch architect Gerard Holt; the house is on the list of municipal monuments.

Influential also was Ruys's use and propagation of plants grown from bulbs. Her advice on how and where to plant the bulbs is cited even in the United States.

Mien Ruys has influenced many contemporary landscape architects, among others Piet Oudolf and Jacqueline van der Kloet. Landscape architect Julia Crawford wrote the first extensive overview of Ruys's work in English: Mien Ruys: The Mother of Modernist Gardens.

== Tuinen Mien Ruys ==
The Tuinen Mien Ruys opened in 1976, and contain 30 model gardens. It is run by the Foundation Tuinen Mien Ruys, which began cooperating with the Rijksdienst voor het Cultureel Erfgoed in 2001. As a result, three of the individual gardens received the status of Rijksmonument ("national monument"). In 2002, the Tuinen Mien Ruys made the news because of financial difficulties, to which it responded by expanding its activities. The foundation also broke with the Moerheim Nursery to which it was still connected and built its own entrance; with the help of volunteers and donors it became financially solvent again in 2008.

== Notable projects ==
- Company garden for KNSM on the KNSM Island, Amsterdam, now renamed Mien Ruysplantsoen (1956, 1994)
- Garden for Diaconessenhuis (hospital), Amsterdam
