= Horst Janson =

Horst Janson may refer to:

- H. W. Janson (1913–1982), American scholar of art history
- Horst Janson (actor) (1935–2025), German actor
