= Roy Diblik =

American garden designer

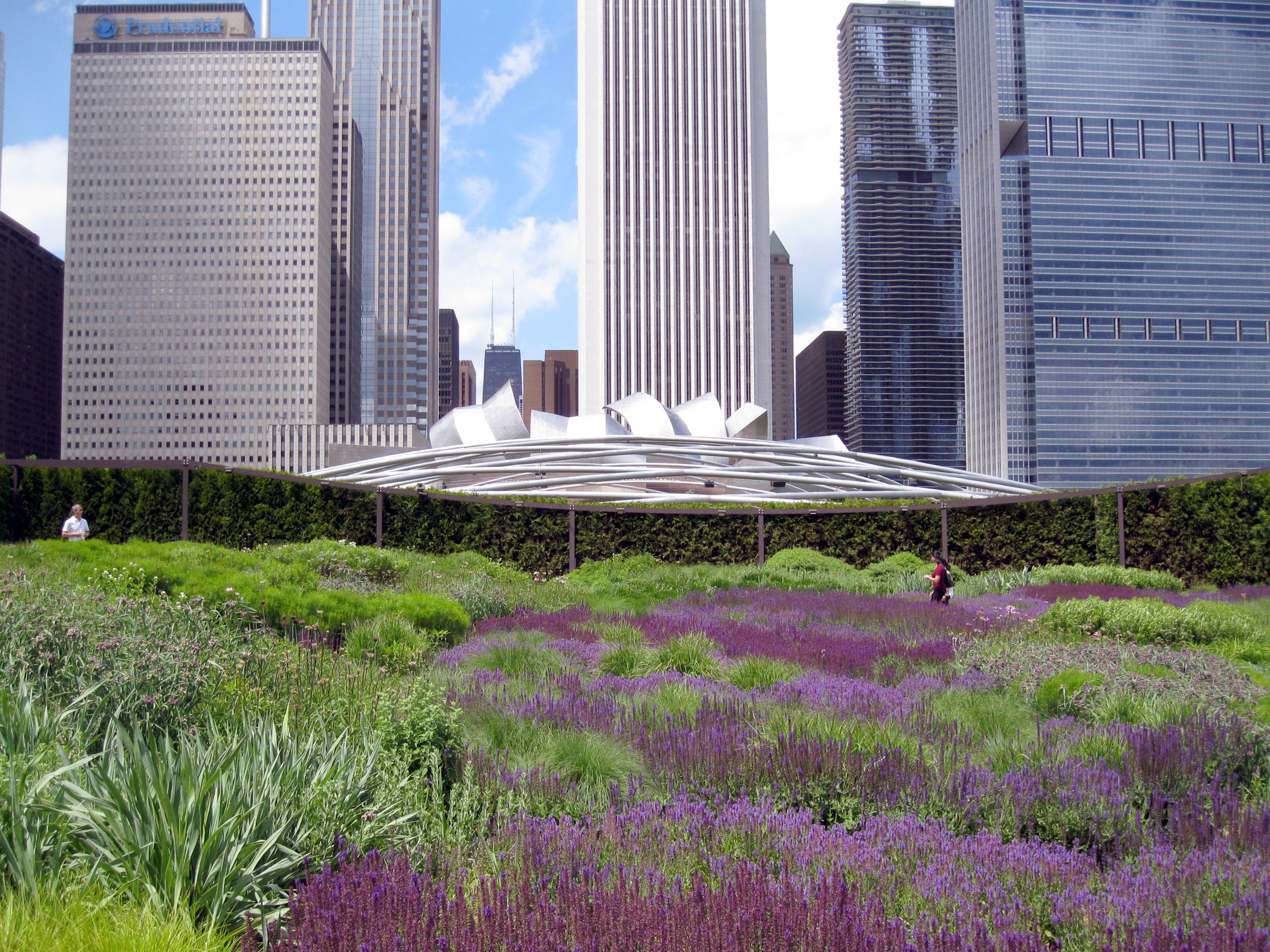
Lurie Garden in Chicago

Roy Diblik is an American perennial garden designer, plant nurseryman, and author of The Know Maintenance Perennial Garden (2014). He co-owns the Northwind Perennial Farm in Burlington, Wisconsin.

Diblik has collaborated with Dutch garden designer Piet Oudolf on projects such as the Lurie Garden in Chicago, Illinois.
