= Dora Jane Janson =

American art historian (1916–2002)

Dora Jane Janson, née Heineberg (1916–2002) was an American art historian, who collaborated with her husband Horst W. Janson.

== Life ==
Dora Jane Heineberg was born in Philadelphia. She studied art history at Radcliffe College, where she met Horst W. Janson, an émigré graduate student at Harvard University. The couple married after he had gained his PhD in 1941. Janson "never denied that she consciously sacrificed her career to raise children". She helped her husband with his 1952 monograph Apes and Ape Lore in the Middle Ages and the Renaissance, providing an "exemplary index". She also collaborated as co-author with her husband on The Story of Painting for Young People (1954) and History of Art (1962). History of Art entirely excluded women painters.

Dora Janson's From slave to siren (1971), an extensive catalog of a Duke University Museum of Art exhibition on Victorian women's jewellery, related the jewelry to changing 19th-century ideals of feminine beauty and behaviour, reflected in cameo portraiture.

Janson died in Devon, Pennsylvania. Her son Anthony Janson is also an art historian.

== Works ==
- (with H. W. Janson) The picture history of painting: from cave painting to modern times, 1957
- (ed. with H. W. Janson) Key monuments of the history of art: a visual survey, 1959
- (with H. W. Janson) History of art: a survey of the major visual arts from the dawn of history to the present day, 1962
- (with H. W. Janson and Joseph Kerman) A history of art and music, 1968
- From slave to siren: the Victorian woman and her jewelry, from neoclassic to art nouveau, 1971
- (with Hugh Johnson and David Revere McFadden) Wine, celebration and ceremony, 1985
