= Noel Kingsbury =

British gardener

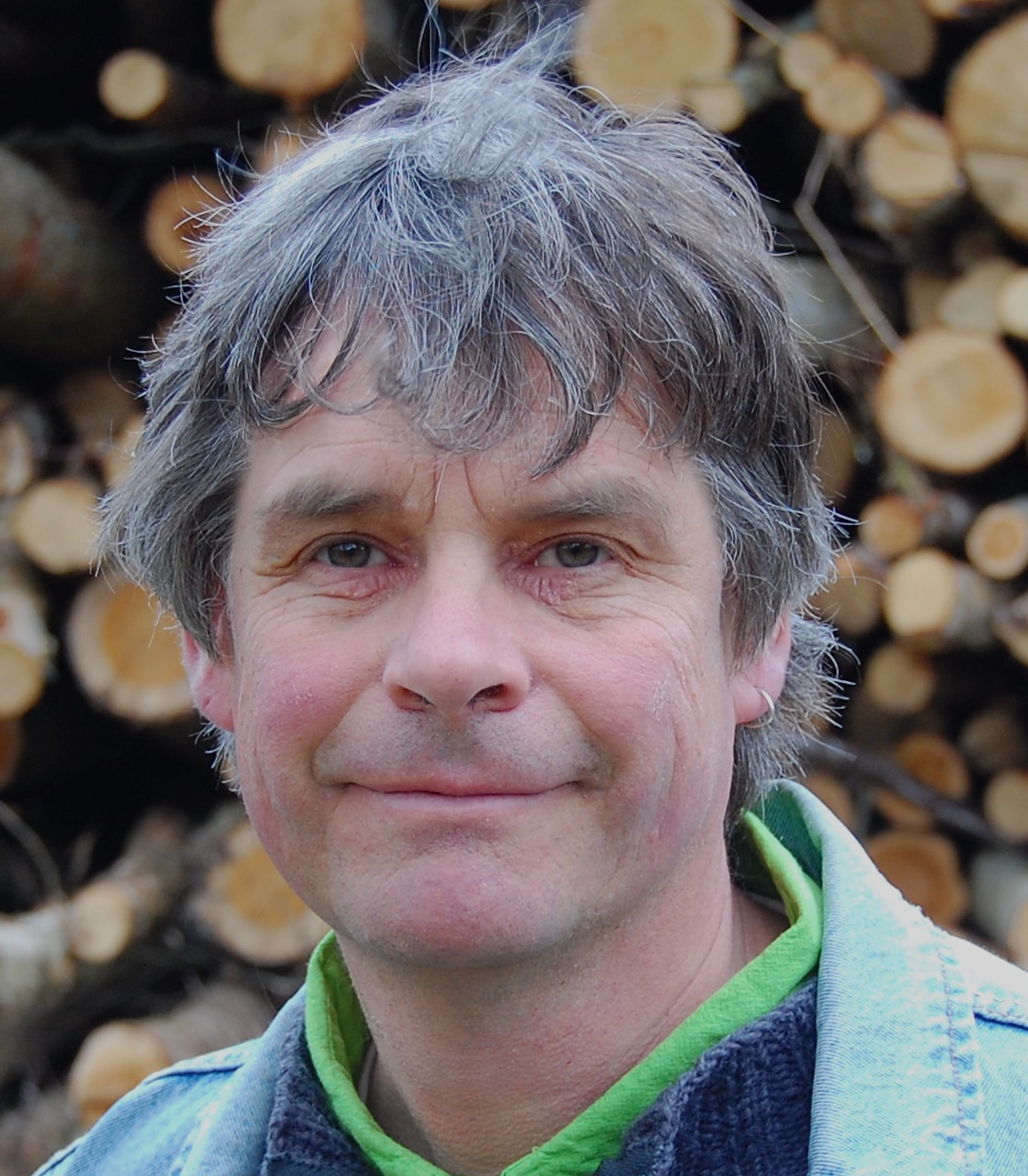
- Kingsbury in 2013
- Occupations: Garden designer, writer

Academic background
- Education: University of Sheffield
- Thesis: An investigation into the performance of species in ecologically based ornamental herbaceous vegetation, with particular reference to competition in productive environments (2008)

Noel Kingsbury is a British garden designer and writer on gardening, plant sciences and related topics. He is best known for his promotion of naturalistic planting design in gardens and designed landscapes (e.g. the 1996 publication of 'The New Perennial Garden', pub. Frances Lincoln, London), and his collaboration with Dutch garden and landscape designer Piet Oudolf on books on planting design. He writes occasionally for The Daily Telegraph, Gardens Illustrated magazine and The Garden - the membership magazine of the Royal Horticultural Society. He has worked with Nigel Dunnett of the University of Sheffield on the first book in English on green roof and related 'green architecture' technologies. In collaboration with Tim Richardson Kingsbury has edited Vista, the Culture and Politics of Gardens and co-chairs events at the Garden Museum in London under the title 'Vista'. He has worked with several notable garden photographers, such as Marianne Majerus and Andrea Jones.

Kingsbury earned a doctorate from the University of Sheffield in 2009, for a thesis on the Long term performance of ornamental herbaceous vegetation. He continues to research in this area.

Kingsbury has also written a history of plant breeding, Hybrid, The History and Science of Plant Breeding (2009).

== Books ==
- Kingsbury, Noel (1996). The Indoor Gardener: Creative Displays for Every Home. Headline Publishing Group. ISBN 9780747278658.
- Potter, Jennifer; Kingsbury, Noel (1998). Secret Gardens. Conran Octopus. ISBN 9781850299622.
- Kingsbury, Noel (2003). Natural Gardening in Small Spaces. Frances Lincoln. ISBN 9780711220157.
- Dunnett, Nigel; Kingsbury, Noel (2008). Planting Green Roofs and Living Walls. Timber Press. ISBN 9780881929119.
- Oudolf, Piet; Kingsbury, Noel (2009). Designing with Plants. Conran Octopus. ISBN 9781840915266.
- Kingsbury, Noel (2011). Hybrid: The History & Science of Plant Breeding. University of Chicago Press. ISBN 9780226437132.
- Kingsbury, Noel (2011). Garden Designers at Home: The Private Spaces of the World's Leading Designers. Pavilion Books. ISBN 9781862058422.
- Oudolf, Piet; Kingsbury, Noel (2011). Landscapes in Landscapes. The Monacelli Press. ISBN 9789089892850.
- Kingsbury, Noel (2013). Daffodil: The Remarkable Story of the World's Most Popular Spring Flower. Timber Press. ISBN 9781604693188.
- Kingsbury, Noel (2014). Gardening with Perennials: Lessons from Chicago's Lurie Garden. University of Chicago Press. ISBN 9780226437453.
- Kingsbury, Noel (2015). Hidden Histories: Trees. Timber Press. ISBN 9781604696172.
- Oudolf, Piet; Kingsbury, Noel (2015). Hummelo: A Journey Through a Plantsman's Life. Monacelli Press. ISBN 9781580934183.
- Kingsbury, Noel (2016). Garden Flora: The Natural and Cultural History of the Plants in Your Garden. Timber Press. ISBN 9781604697735.
- Kingsbury, Noel; de Ridder, Maayke (2016). New Small Garden: Contemporary Principles, Planting and Practice. Frances Lincoln. ISBN 9780711236806.
- Oudolf, Piet; Kingsbury, Noel (2016). Planting: A New Perspective. Timber Press. ISBN 9781604697315.
- Blake, Jimi; Kingsbury, Noel (2019). A Beautiful Obsession: Jimi Blake's World of Plants at Hunting Brook Gardens. Filbert Press. ISBN 9781999734527.
- Kingsbury, Noel; Takacs, Calire (2022). Wild, the Naturalistic Garden. Phaidon. ISBN 9781838661052.
- Kingsbury, Noel (2023). Piet Oudolf At Work. Phaidon Press. ISBN 9781838664244.
- Kingsbury, Noel (2023). The Story of Flowers and How They Changed the Way we Live. Orion. ISBN 9780857829207.
