= H. W. Janson =

American art historian (1913–1982)

- Born: October 4, 1913; St. Petersburg, Russia
- Died: September 30, 1982 (aged 68)
- Education: Ludwig-Maximilians-Universität München; University of Hamburg
- Spouse: Dora Jane Heineberg
- Scientific career
- Workplaces: Harvard University; Worcester Art Museum; University of Iowa School of Art and Art History; Radcliffe College
- Academic advisors: Erwin Panofsky
- Doctoral students: Ruth Butler

Horst Woldemar Janson (October 4, 1913 – September 30, 1982), was a Russian-born German-American professor of art history best known for his History of Art, which was first published in 1962 and has since sold more than four million copies in fifteen languages. His academic specialization was the sculpture of Donatello.

== Early life and education ==
Janson was born in St. Petersburg in 1913 to Friedrich Janson (1875–1927) and Helene Porsch (Janson) (1879–1974), a Lutheran family of Baltic German stock. After the October Revolution, the family moved to Finland and then to Hamburg, where Janson attended the Wilhelms Gymnasium (graduated 1932).

After his German Abitur, Janson studied at the Ludwig-Maximilians-Universität München and then at the art history program at the University of Hamburg, where he was a student of Erwin Panofsky. In 1935, at the suggestion of Panofsky, who had immigrated to the United States, Alfred Barr sponsored Janson as an immigrant, and he completed a PhD at Harvard University in 1942 (his dissertation was on Michelozzo). He taught at the Worcester Art Museum (1936–38) and the University of Iowa School of Art and Art History (1938–41) while pursuing his degree. In 1941, he married Dora Jane Heineberg (1916–2002), an art history student at Radcliffe College who later collaborated with him as co-author, and he became a citizen in 1943.

== Academic career ==
Janson taught at the St. Louis School of Fine Arts at Washington University from 1941 until 1948, where he also took charge of a renewal of the University Art Gallery collection (now known as the Mildred Lane Kemper Art Museum). Janson's plan to sell popular canvases such as Frederic Remington's A Dash for the Timber at the New York galleries of the Kende family drew comment from the local paper, wondering why St. Louisans had not been given preference. Janson sold 120 artworks, retained 80, and acquired 40 works by European modernists through the Kende Galleries: Paul Klee, Juan Gris, Theo van Doesburg.

Janson left in 1948 to join the faculty of New York University, where he developed the undergraduate arts department and taught at the graduate Institute of Fine Arts. Also in 1948, he was awarded a Guggenheim Fellowship. He was recognized with an honorary degree in 1981, and died on a train between Zurich and Milan in 1982 at the age of 68.

He wrote about Renaissance art and nineteenth-century sculpture, and authored two prize-winning books, Apes and Ape Lore in the Middle Ages and the Renaissance (1952) and Sculpture of Donatello (1957). In his later years he was concerned with East–West dialogue in the arts. Over his career, Janson consulted on the Time–Life Library of Art; was president of the College Art Association, editor of the Art Bulletin, and founding member and President of the Renaissance Society of America. He also wrote books on art for young people, some in collaboration with his wife.

Janson's signature contribution to the discipline of art history, specifically to the teaching of art history, is his survey text entitled simply History of Art, which was first published in 1962 and has since become the standard by which current art history textbooks are measured.

== Feminist critiques ==
Despite or perhaps because of the influence of History of Art, it came under increased scrutiny by art historians, who sought a more inclusive story of Western art. According to feminist art historians Norma Broude and Mary Garrard: "Women artists in the 1950s and 1960s suffered professional isolation not only from one another, but also from their own history, in an era when women artists of the past had been virtually written out of the history of art, H.W. Janson's influential textbook, History of Art, first published in 1962, contained neither the name nor the work of a single woman artist. In thus excluding women from the history of art (...)."

The updated editions of his History of Art, made by his son, Anthony F. Janson, have included several women artists from different eras.

In response's to History of Art's omittance of female artists, between 2020 and 2025 Nicole Ex, the founding editor of See All This Art Magazine, developed the Pretty Brilliant Women in the Arts series, spanning as many pages as Janson's text and dedicated exclusively to female voices in the visual arts.

== References and sources ==
Sources

- Turner, A. Richard (Winter 1982). "Horst Waldemar Janson". Obituary. Renaissance Quarterly. 35 (4). Renaissance Quarterly, Vol. 35, No. 4: 672–673. doi:10.2307/2861406. JSTOR 2861406. S2CID 251375027.
- Ohles, Shirley; Ohles, Frederik; Ramsay, John (28 October 1997). "JANSON, Horst Woldemar". Biographical Dictionary of Modern American Educators. Bloomsbury Publishing USA. pp. 179–180. ISBN 978-0-313-00500-8.
- Sears, Elizabeth; Schoell-Glass, Charlotte (June 2013). "An Émigré Art Historian and America: H. W. Janson". The Art Bulletin. 95 (2): 219–242.
