= Lidewij Edelkoort =

Dutch trend forecaster

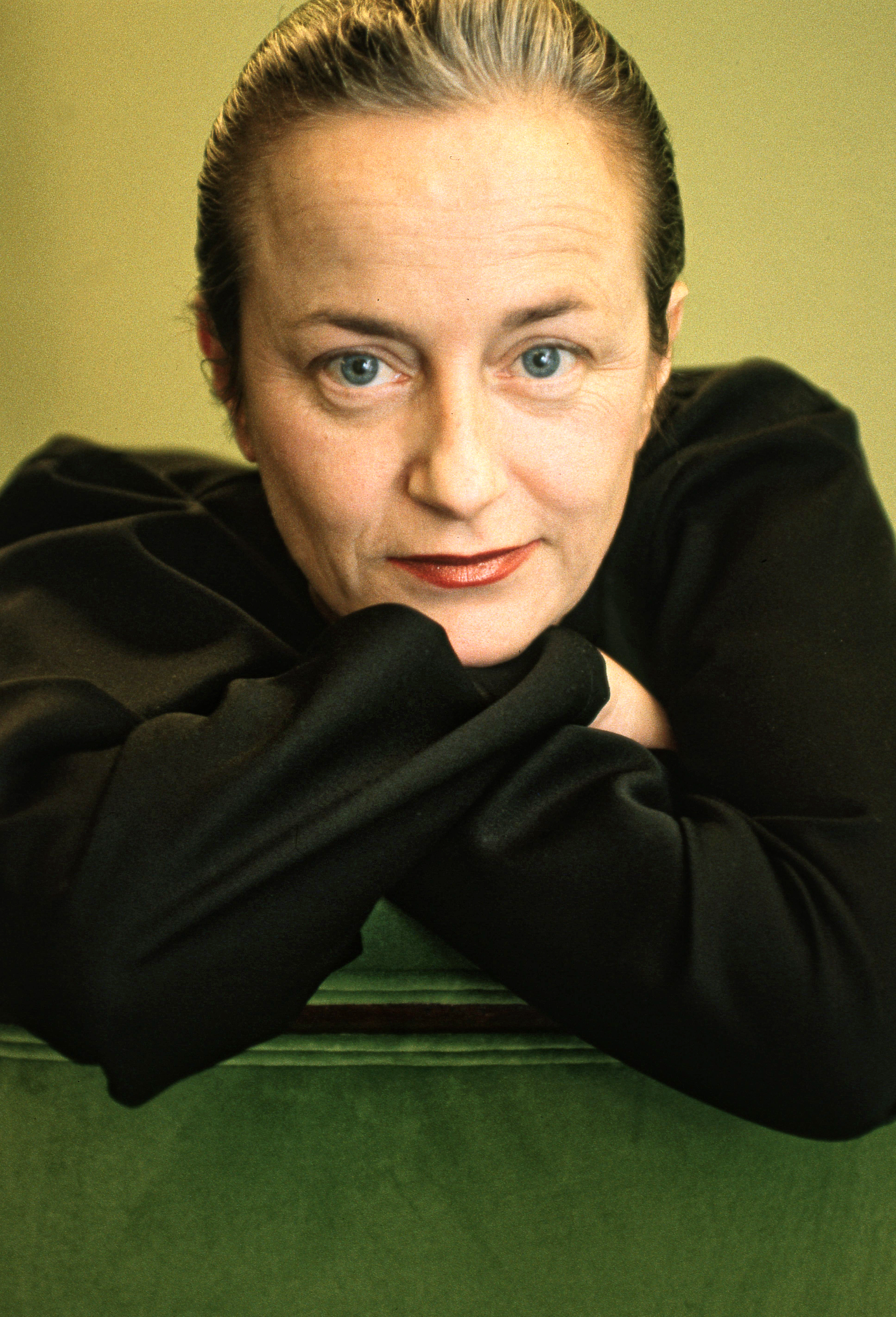
Lidewij Edelkoort, Paris 1996.

Lidewijde Gerarda Hillegonda Edelkoort, often called Li, (born 29 August 1950) is a Dutch trend forecaster, someone who anticipates future fashion and design trends. She has been the Founder and Chief Executive Officer of Trend Union since 1986.

== Early life ==
Edelkoort was born on 29 August 1950 in Wageningen, The Netherlands. Her parents are Jan Edelkoort and Hillegonda van der Spek. She attended the Academy of Fine Arts, Arnhem, receiving a bachelors degree in Fashion in 1972.

== Career ==
Edelkoort began her career as a fashion coordinator at the Amsterdam department store De Bijenkorf. After finishing her degree at ArtEZ, in 1975 she relocated to France, where she set up as an independent trend consultancy. She soon created the consultancy 'Trend Union', a trend forecasting service based in Paris. Trend Union provides bi-annual trend forecasting books for the fashion and design community with colour and lifestyle information. She then founded Studio Edelkoort, a consultancy bureau, and opened two offices in New York City (Edelkoort Inc) and Tokyo (Edelkoort East). In September 2015 she was hired to oversee a new textile design program at Parsons School of Design, where she currently serves as Dean of Hybrid Studies.

She has helped to shape products for international brands, advising on product identity and development strategy, and her clients have included Coca-Cola, Nissan, Camper, Siemens, Moooi, and Douwe Egberts. In the beauty industry, Studio Edelkoort's has developed concepts and beauty products for Estée Lauder, Lancôme, L'Oréal, Shiseido, Dim, and Gucci.

She is the art director and co-publisher of the magazine View on Colour. This looks at trends in colour taste with a view to their influence on fashion, graphics, industrial design, packaging, cosmetics and many other areas. She is also publisher of Interior View magazine. She launched the photo-magazine Bloom in 1998, which she describes as "horti-cultural", because it charts the changing trends in flowers and the way their images are used. She is involved in the non-profit humanitarian organization Heartwear which helps third world producers market their goods in the west through a mail order catalogue. The profits return to the producers' communities.

In 1999 she was elected Chairwoman of the Design Academy, Eindhoven, Netherlands, where she served until 2008. In 2011, Edelkoort launched the website and social media platform called TrendTablet. She described the COVID-19 pandemic as an opportunity in that the global disruption of travel and of the supply chain from China might trigger new forms of local sourcing and production.

== Awards and honors ==
The British design magazine i-D listed her among the world's 40 most important designers and Time magazine named her one of the 25 most influential fashion experts of our day. On 22 February 2008, on behalf of the French Minister of Culture Didier Grumbach, President of the French Fédération de la Couture, Edelkoort was invested with the Chevalier des Arts et des Lettres in recognition of her artistic and literary creative contribution to France and international culture. Edelkoort also received an Honorary Degree of Doctor of Art from the United Kingdom's Nottingham Trent University, at the university's awards ceremony on 15 July 2008. On 26 November 2012, she received an award for her oeuvre of work from the Dutch foundation Prins Bernhard Cultuurfonds.

She lives in Paris.

== Publications (selected) ==
- The pop-up generation. Design between dimension. by Lidewij Edelkoort, Amsterdam, BIS Publishers, 2012. ISBN 978-90-6369-282-7
- Fetishism in fashion, compiled by Lidewij Edelkoort & edited by Philip Fimmano. Amsterdam, Frame Publishers, 2013. ISBN 978-94-9172713-9
- A Labour of Love by Lidewij Edelkoort & Philip Fimmano. Eindhoven, Lecturis, 2020. ISBN 9789462263918
- Proud South curated by Lidewij Edelkoort with Lili Tedde & Mariola Lopez Mariño. Eindhoven, Lecturis, 2022. ISBN 9789462264441
- See All This Art Magazine#34 The Wardrobe as Art Collection, 2024
