= Potters Fields Park =

Public park in London, England

Coordinates: 51°30′15″N 0°04′43″W

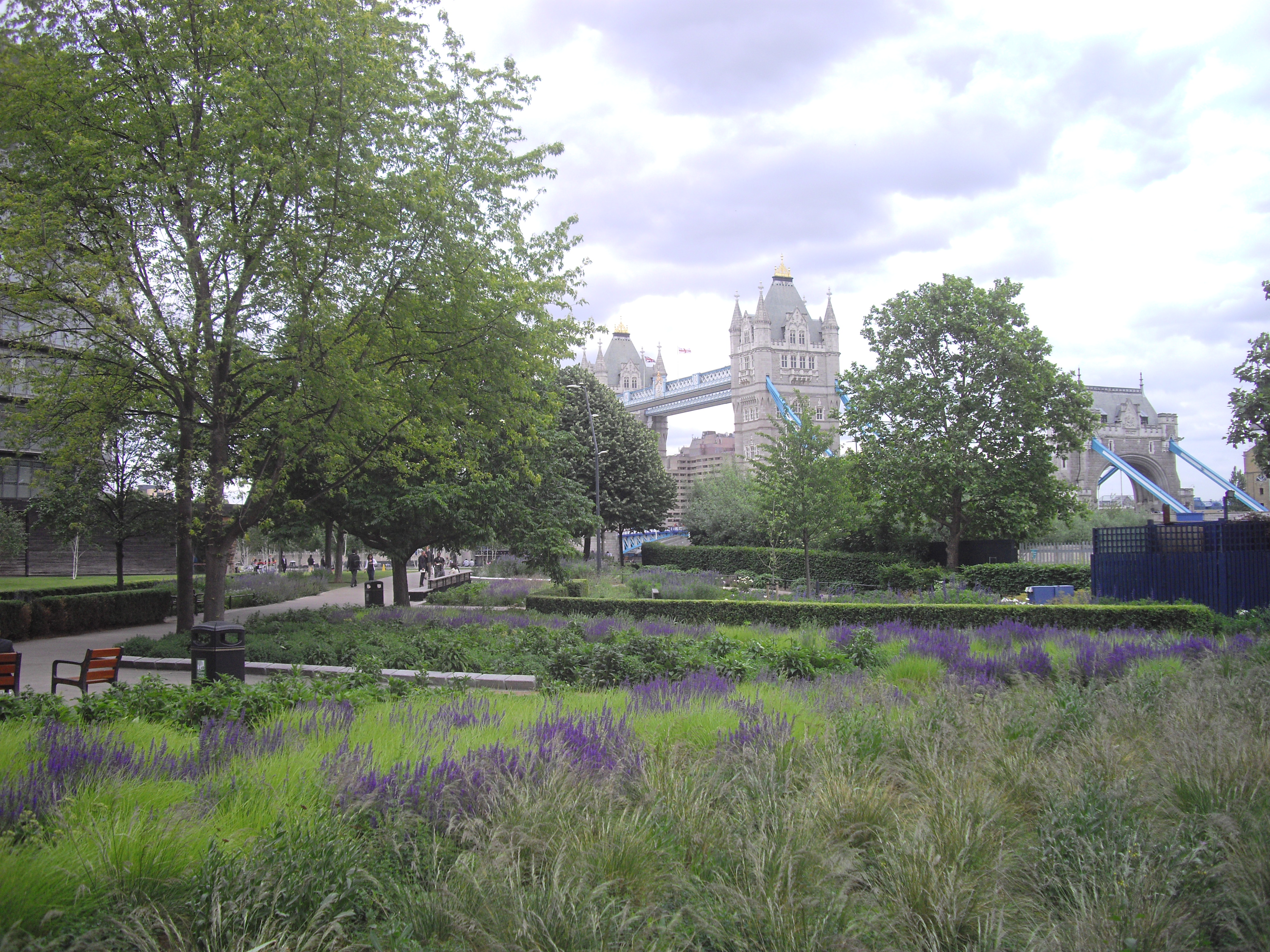
The view of Tower Bridge from Potters Fields Park

Potters Fields Park is a small public park situated in the London Borough of Southwark in London, England. The park is located immediately south-west of Tower Bridge and immediately south-east of City Hall, London. It is frequently used for food festivals and other events.

The name originates from the many potters who lived and worked in the area in the 17th and 18th centuries. The land has never been a potter's field (a burial ground for the poor), although there were graveyards in the area.

== History ==
The first named pottery in the Potters Fields Park records is Pickleherring Pottery. It was established in 1618 by Christian Wilhelm; in the 1670s and 1680s, at least two other potteries were established by other people in the same area.

On the 1682 William Morgan Map, the area is referred to as "Potts Fields"; the St Olave's Parish Register shows 124 Potters operating in the area between 1618 and 1710. The number was down to 68 between 1710 and 1733.

The Rocques Map of 1746 shows "Potters Fields" as a street name for the lane linking Tooley Street to Pickleherring Street.

By 1772 pottery making had disappeared from the area.

In 1988 St Martin's Property Corporation and Southwark Council agreed on the name "London Bridge City Park", but local community groups protested and it finally opened as "Potters Fields Park".
