= Claudy Jongstra =

Dutch artist and textile designer

- Born: February 6, 1963 (age 63); Roermond, Netherlands
- Education: Utrecht School of the Arts
- Known for: Textile design

Claudy Jongstra (born 6 February 1963) is a Dutch artist and textile designer.

== Biography ==
Jongstra studied fashion design at the Utrecht School of the Arts between 1982 and 1989. Her work is characterized by her use of wool in the form of handcrafted felt. Much of the wool she uses is from Drenthe Heath sheep, which she raises herself in the Northern Netherlands. She often colors the wool with vegetable dyes made from vegetables grown in her own garden.

She is known, in particular, for the unique kinds of hybrid or nuno felts she creates through combining a variety of materials with wool. These combined fibers include silk, linen, and chiffons, as well as fibers from animals such as yak or camel. Her felting process is also distinguished by the multiple stages of reworking required for achieving certain effects.

One of her early major assignments involved working on the fabrics for the Jedi costumes in Star Wars Episode 1. She also produced fabrics for fashion and furniture designers, including Alexander van Slobbe, Maarten Baas, Hella Jongerius, John Galliano, Christian Lacroix and Donna Karan. Later in her career, Jongstra started creating large-scale works of art, displayed at museums such as the Fries Museum, the Provinciehuis in Leeuwarden, the Amsterdam Public Library and the San Francisco Museum of Modern Art.

In 2009, her work was selected for inclusion in "Fashioning Felt", an international show on felt sponsored by the Smithsonian, which was exhibited at the Cooper-Hewitt National Design Museum in New York City.

The work of Claudy Jongstra is included in various museum collections, including the Stedelijk Museum Amsterdam, the Rijksmuseum, the Victoria and Albert Museum and the Museum of Modern Art.

== Solo exhibitions ==
- 2016: Aarde, San Francisco Museum of Modern Art
- 2013: Sculptuur Fries Landschap, Fries Museum entrance hall, Leeuwarden
- 2012: Mother of Pearl, Barnes Foundation, main building and restaurant, Philadelphia
- 2010: North Wall Atrium installation, Lincoln Center for the Performing Arts, New York
- 2007: Wall decoration, Amsterdam Public Library entrance
- 2005: Wall decoration, Kunsthal restaurant, Rotterdam
- 2004: Tapestry, Dutch Embassy, Berlin
- 2003: Mother of Pearl and Blue silver, Catshuis ladies room and dining room, the Hague

== Group exhibitions ==
- 2011: United Nations, New York
- 2007: Architecture Biennale, Sao Paulo
- 2006: TextielMuseum, Tilburg

== Awards ==
- 2008: Prince Bernhard Culture Fund, Prize for Visual Arts
- 2005: Vredeman de Vries Prize
- 2005: Amsterdam Award for Art

== Publications ==
- 2021: See All This Art Magazine #24 Colour Fields

== Further viewing ==
- Detiger, Allard (11 May 2013). Verweven wereld : Claudy Jongstra [Interwoven World : Claudy Jongstra] (in Dutch). Amsterdam: AVRO. OCLC 993549344, 878123139.
