= Iwan Baan =

Dutch photographer (born 1975)

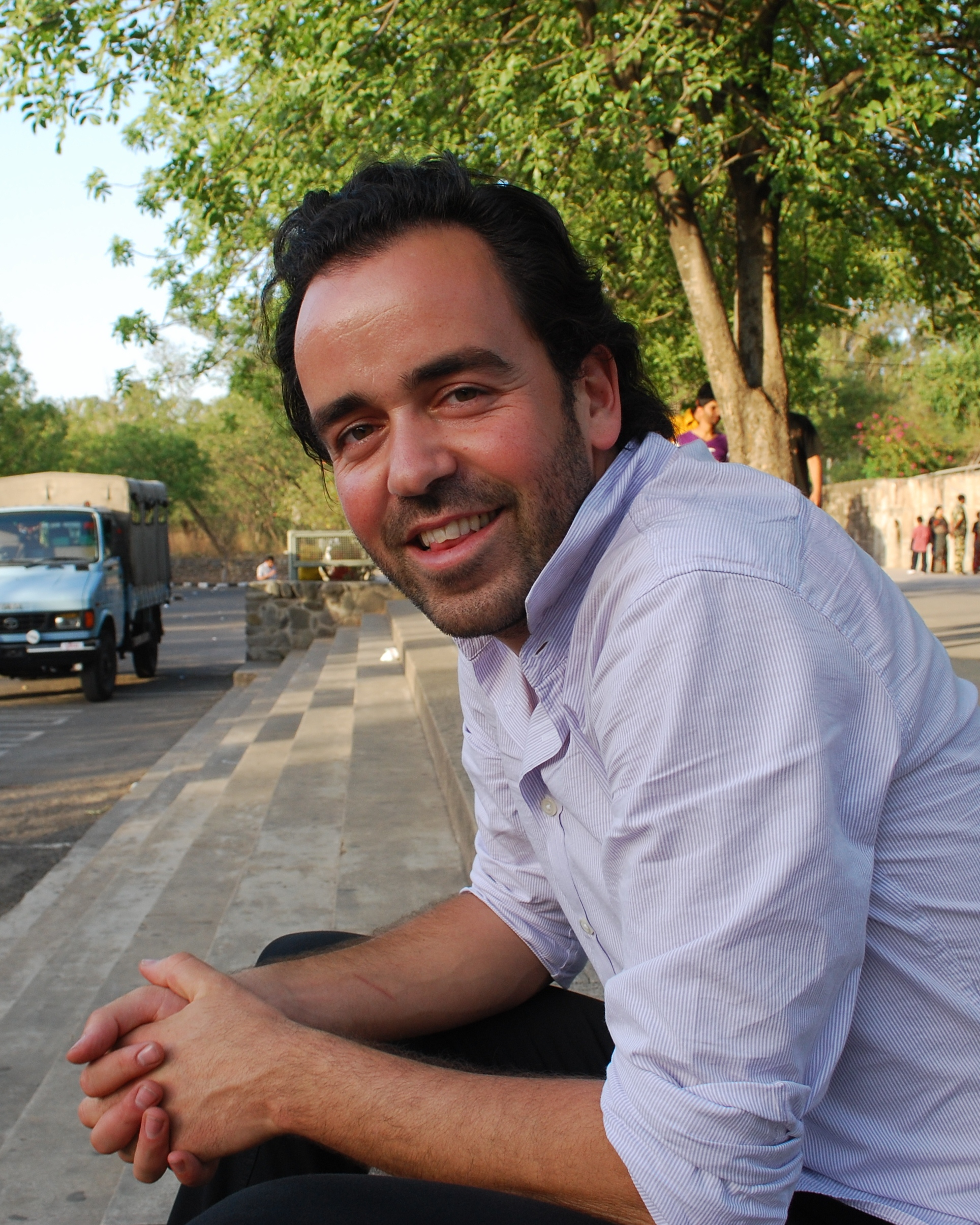
- Iwan Baan in 2010
- Born: February 8, 1975 (age 51); Alkmaar, Netherlands
- Known for: Photography
- Website: www.iwan.com

Iwan Baan (born February 8, 1975, in Alkmaar) is a Dutch photographer. He has challenged a long-standing tradition of depicting buildings as isolated and static by representing people in architecture and showing the building's environment, trying "to produce more of a story or a feel for a project" and "to communicate how people use the space". He has photographed buildings by many of the world's most prominent architects, including Rem Koolhaas and Toyo Ito. He is "one of the most widely published" photographers in the world. His candid "polysemic shots" have been compared to the work of Diane Arbus.

In 2024 he joined The Daylight Award jury, selecting Daylight in Architecture and Daylight research laureates.

In 2010, he won the first annual Julius Shulman Photography Award, named after the most famous architectural photographer of the 20th century. At the 2012 Venice Architecture Biennale he received the Golden Lion for Best Installation. In 2012, he took the image of Manhattan after Hurricane Sandy that made the cover of New York City magazine—showing light above 42nd St. and darkness below that line—illustrating vividly the storm's disparate impact. It was later turned into a limited edition print sold to benefit Sandy's victims. In April 2016, Baan received the AIA New York's Stephen A. Kliment Oculus Award.

== Published books ==
- Momentum of Light 2021, ISBN 978-3-03778-686-4
- Dudok by Iwan Baan 2021, ISBN 978-94-6208-581-7
- Atmosphere Anatomies – On Design, Weather, and Sensation, 2021, ISBN 978-3-03778-612-3
- Two Sides of the Border, 2020, ISBN 978-3-03778-608-6
- National Museum of Qatar, 2020, ISBN 9780500022764
- Tatiana Bilbao Estudio, 2019, ISBN 978-3-03778-617-8
- Justice is beauty, 2019, ISBN 9781580935272
- Serpentine Pavilion 2019 – Junya Ishigami, ISBN 978-3960986379
- Balkrishna Doshi: Architecture for the People 2019, ISBN 978-3945852316
- Torre Reforma 2019, ISBN 978-6079489434
- Baku – Oil and Urbanism 2018, ISBN 978-3-03860-076-3
- Torre Reforma 2019, ISBN 978-6079489434
- Landscape of Faith: Architectural Interventions along the Mexican Pilgrimage Route 2018, ISBN 978-3037784990
- Solid Objectives: Order, Edge, Aura 2017, ISBN 978-3037785010
- Bengal Stream – The Vibrant Architecture Scene of Bangladesh 2017, ISBN 978-3856168438
- LAB – Building a Home for Scientists 2017, ISBN 978-3037784976
- SoThe Long Life of Design in Italy: B&B Italia. 50 Years and Beyond 2016, ISBN 978-8857231808
- Olafur Eliasson: Riverbed 2015, ISBN 978-8792877284
- Olafur Eliasson: Contact 2015, ISBN 978-2081358065
- Portman's America & Other Speculations, 2017, ISBN 978-3-03778-532-4
- African Modernism, 2015, ISBN 978-3-906027-74-6.
- 52 Weeks, 52 Cities, 2013, ISBN 978-3-86828-477-5.
- Iwan Baan around the world : diary of a year of architecture, 2011, ISBN 978-2-35733-137-2.
- Diller Scofidio + Renfro : Institute of Contemporary Art (ICA), Boston, 2011, ISBN 978-84-343-1280-7.
- Insular insight : where art and architecture conspire with nature : Naoshima, Teshima, Inujima, 2011, ISBN 978-3-03778-255-2. DAM award.
- Iwan Baan, Brasilia - Chandigarh : Living with Modernity, 2010, ISBN 978-3-03778-228-6.
- Porsche Museum : Delugan Meissl Associated Architects, HG Merz, 2010, ISBN 978-3-211-99736-9.
- The SANAA studios 2006–2008 : learning from Japan : single story urbanism, 2010, ISBN 978-3-03778-190-6.
- SANAA, Sejima & Nishizawa : New Museum, New York, 2010, ISBN 978-84-343-1244-9.
- Maxxi : Zaha Hadid Architects, 2010, ISBN 978-0-8478-5800-2.
- Hamsun, Holl, Hamarøy : literature, Knut Hamsun : architecture, Steven Holl : landscape, Hamarøy, Nordland, 2010, ISBN 978-3-03778-214-9.
- (in German) Richard Neutra in Europa : Bauten und Projekte 1960–1970, 2010, ISBN 978-3-8321-9286-0.
- Song through 21st century eyes : Yaozhou and Qingbai ceramics, 2009, ISBN 978-90-79920-01-3.
- Maddalena effect : an architectural affair, 2009, ISBN 978-88-96710-02-9.
- Building China Five Projects / Five Stories, 2008, ISBN 978-84-96954-51-9.
- (in Dutch) Onze bruggen : opdrachtgeverschap bij bruggen in zes Nederlandse gemeenten, 2007, ISBN 978-90-809370-3-1.
- (in Dutch) Perspectief : maakbare geschiedenis, 2007, ISBN 978-90-801589-7-9.

== Published videos ==
- Dutch painters of the Golden Age, 2002, OCLC 67086003
- Iwan Baan at TED

== Exhibitions ==
- Iwan Baan: 52 Weeks, 52 Cities, Exhibited in Montpellier (2016) Copenhagen (2015), Hamburg (2015), Herford (2013)
- Iwan Baan: The Way We Live, 2013, Perry Rubenstein Gallery, Los Angeles
- Iwan Baan, 2010 autour du monde, journal d'une année d'architecture, 2011, Hyères
- Iwan Baan - Recent Works - Contemporary Architectural Photographs, 2008, London
- Building China Five Projects / Five Stories, 2008, New York
