= Mory Sacko =

French chef

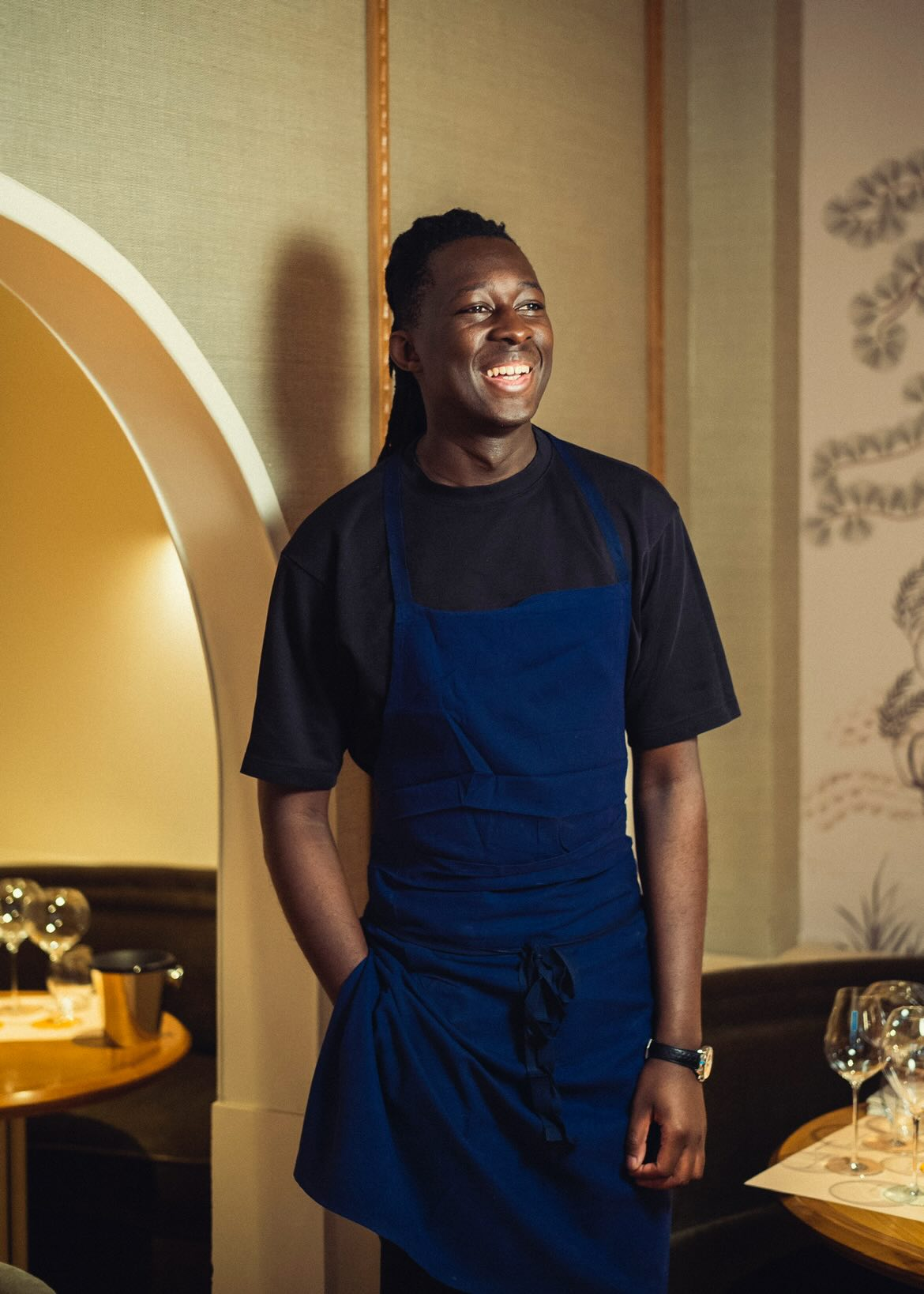
- Sacko in 2024
- Born: 24 September 1992 (age 32); Champigny-sur-Marne, France
- Occupation: Chef

Mory Sacko (born 24 September 1992) is a French chef.

== Biography ==
Mory Sacko is from Senegalese and Malian descent. He earned a Michelin star with his first restaurant, MoSuke. Sacko opened the 35-seat restaurant in Paris in September 2020 with a mix of French, West African, and Japanese cuisine. Dishes include beef filet cured in shea butter with mafé (peanuts), and "Breton lobster with tomato miso, lacto-fermented chilies, and charred watermelon". It is one of the few restaurants using West African ingredients to receive a Michelin star, and one of only six Michelin star restaurants to have a black executive chef, as of 2023.

Sacko opened a restaurant with Louis Vuitton in Saint-Tropez in June 2022, named Mory Sacko at Louis Vuitton.
