= David Whyte (poet) =

English poet (born 1955)

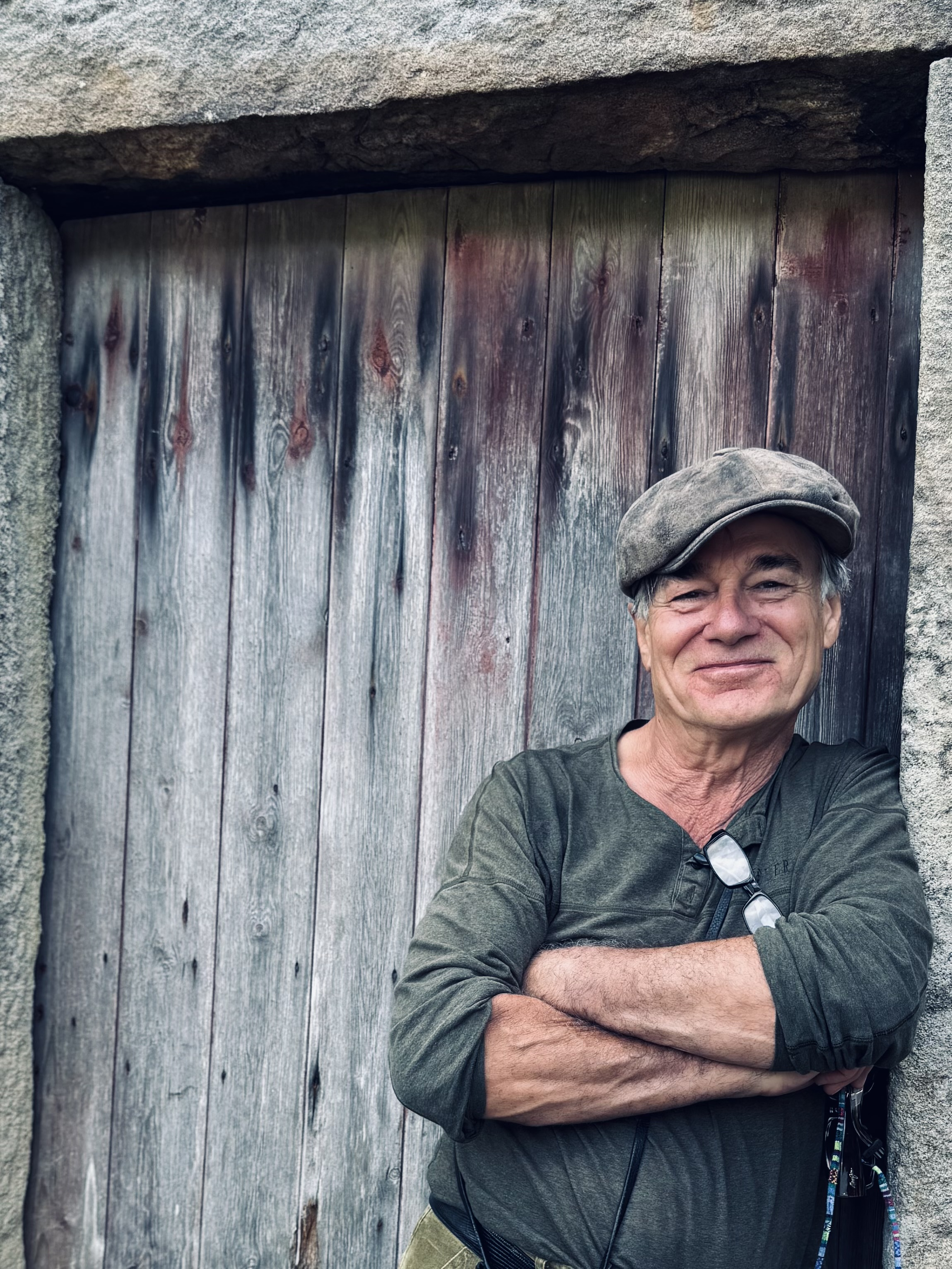
- Whyte in 2025
- Born: 2 November 1955 (age 70); Mirfield, Yorkshire
- Occupation: Poet
- Website: davidwhyte.com

David Whyte (born 2 November 1955) is an Anglo-Irish poet. He has said that all of his poetry and philosophy are based on "the conversational nature of reality". His book The Heart Aroused: Poetry and the Preservation of the Soul in Corporate America (1994) topped the best-seller charts in the United States.

== Life and work ==
Whyte's mother was from Waterford, Ireland, and his father was a Yorkshireman. He attributes his poetic interest to both the songs and the poetry of his mother's Irish heritage and to the landscape of West Yorkshire. He grew up in West Yorkshire and has commented that he had "a Wordsworthian childhood", in the fields and woods and on the moors. Whyte has a degree in marine zoology from Bangor University.

During his twenties, Whyte worked as a naturalist and lived in the Galápagos Islands, where he experienced a near drowning on the southern shore of Hood Island. He led anthropological and natural history expeditions in the Andes, the Amazon and the Himalayas.

Revelation must be
terrible with no time left
to say goodbye.

Imagine that moment
staring at the still waters
with only the brief tremor

of your body to say
you are leaving everything
and everyone you know behind.

— From "Revelation Must Be Terrible"

Whyte moved to the United States in 1981 and began a career as a poet and speaker in 1986. From 1987, he began taking his poetry and philosophy to larger audiences, including consulting and lecturing on organisational leadership models in the US and UK exploring the role of creativity in business. He has worked with companies such as Boeing, AT&T, NASA, Toyota, The Royal Air Force and the Arthur Andersen accountancy group.

Work and vocation, and "Conversational Leadership" are the subjects of several of Whyte's prose books, including Crossing the Unknown Sea: Work as Pilgrimage of Identity, The Three Marriages: Reimagining Work, Self and Relationship and The Heart Aroused: Poetry and the Preservation of The Soul in Corporate America, which topped the business best seller lists, selling 155,000 copies.

Whyte has written ten volumes of poetry and four books of prose. Pilgrim is based on the human need to travel, "From here to there". The House of Belonging looks at the same human need for home. He describes his collection Everything Is Waiting For You (2003) as arising from the grief at the loss of his mother. Pilgrim was published in May 2012. His latest book is Consolations: The Solace, Nourishment and Underlying Meaning of Everyday Words, an attempt to "rehabilitate" many everyday words we often use only in pejorative or unimaginative ways. He has also written for newspapers, including The Huffington Post and The Observer. He leads group poetry and walking journeys regularly in Ireland, England and Italy.

Whyte has an honorary degree from Neumann College, Pennsylvania, and from Royal Roads University, British Columbia, and is Associate Fellow of both Templeton College, Oxford, and Saïd Business School, Oxford.

Whyte has spent a portion of every year for the last twenty-five years in County Clare, Ireland. Over the years and over a number of volumes of poetry he has built a cycle of poems that evoke many of the ancient pilgrimage sites of The Burren mountains of North Clare and of Connemara.

Whyte runs the "Many Rivers" organisation and "Invitas: The Institute for Conversational Leadership", which he founded in 2014. He has lived in Seattle and on Whidbey Island and currently lives in the US Pacific North West; he holds US, British and Irish citizenship. He was married to Gayle Karen Young, former Chief Talent and Culture Officer of the Wikimedia Foundation. He has a son from his first marriage to Autumn Preble, and a daughter from his second marriage to Leslie Cotter. Whyte has practised Zen and was a regular rock climber. He was a close friend of the Irish poet John O'Donohue.

== Works ==
=== Poetry collections ===
- Songs for Coming Home, Many Rivers Press, 1984
- Where Many Rivers Meet, Many Rivers Press, 1990
- Fire in the Earth, Many Rivers Press, 1992
- The House of Belonging, Many Rivers Press, 1996
- Everything is Waiting for You, Many Rivers Press, 2003
- River Flow: New & Selected Poems, Langley, Washington: Many Rivers Press, 2007. ISBN 9781932887174, OCLC 77908400
- River Flow: New & Selected Poems. Revised Edition, Langley, Washington: Many Rivers Press, 2012. ISBN 9781932887273, OCLC 812068424
- Pilgrim, Langley, WA: Many Rivers Press, 2012. ISBN 9781932887259, OCLC 810123963
- The Sea in You, Langley, Washington: Many Rivers Press, 2016. ISBN 9781932887389, OCLC 932084907
- The Bell and the Blackbird, Langley, Washington : Many Rivers Press, 2018. ISBN 9781932887471, OCLC 1032674032
- David Whyte : Essentials, Langley, Washington: Many Rivers Press, 2018. ISBN 9781932887501,
- David Whyte: Still Possible, Langley, Washington: Many Rivers Press, 2022, ISBN 9781932887556

=== Prose ===
- The Heart Aroused: Poetry & the Preservation of the Soul in Corporate America, London: Industrial Society, 1997. ISBN 9781858354262, OCLC 611199793
- Crossing the Unknown Sea: Work as A Pilgrimage of Identity, London: Penguin, 2002. ISBN 9780141005935, OCLC 828282621
- The Three Marriages: Reimagining Work, Self & Relationship, New York: Riverhead Books, 2010. ISBN 9781594484353, OCLC 426804106
- Consolations: The Solace, Nourishment and Underlying Meaning of Everyday Words, Langley, Washington: Many Rivers Press, 2014. ISBN 9781932887365, ISBN 9781786897633

=== Audiobooks ===
- Pilgrim
- Sometimes
- Return
- What to remember when waking
- Echoes in the well
- Sweet darkness
- Clear mind wild heart
- Midlife and the great unknown
- Thresholds
- The poetry of self compassion
- Life at the frontier
- A change for the better
- The teacher's vocation
- Make a friend of the unknown
- The opening of eyes
- Faithful to all things
- The power and place of poetry
- Footsteps: A writing life
- Solace: The Art of Asking the Beautiful Question

=== As editor ===
- See All This Art Magazine #36 "To be a Pilgrim" (2024)
