= Lou Loeber =

Dutch artist

- Self-portrait, 1921
- Born: Louise Marie Loeber; 3 May 1894; Amsterdam, Netherlands
- Died: 2 February 1983 (aged 88); Laren, Netherlands
- Other names: Lou Koning-Loeber
- Known for: Painting
- Spouse: Dirk Koning

Louise "Lou" Marie Loeber (3 May 1894 – 2 February 1983) was a Dutch painter.

== Biography ==
Loeber was born on 3 May 1894 in Amsterdam. She attended the Rijksakademie van beeldende kunsten (State Academy of Fine Arts) in Amsterdam from 1915 to 1918.

After leaving the Rijksakademie she returned to her home in Blaricum, where she had a studio. She began exhibiting her work in 1921 at Kunstzaal Reddingius (Hilversum). Around this time she began traveling throughout Europe, including to Belgium, Germany, Portugal, and Spain. Her work was influenced by Cubism, De Stijl, Expressionism, Neo-Plasticism, and Symbolism but she did not consider herself an abstract painter.

Loeber joined the Sociaal-Democratische Arbeiders Partij (Social Democratic Workers Party) (SDAP) in 1925.

In 1927 she traveled to Berlin and Dessau in Germany, where she visited the Bauhaus.

In 1931 Loeber married fellow artist Dirk Koning (1888–1978).

Loeber's work was included in the 1939 exhibition and sale Onze Kunst van Heden (Our Art of Today) at the Rijksmuseum in Amsterdam. She was a member of the Kunstenaarsvereniging Laren-Blaricum (Artists association Laren-Blaricum), Gooische Kunstkring (Gooische Art circle), and De Socialistischen Kunstenaarskring (The Socialist Artists Circle).

In 1980 Loeber published her memoirs.

Loeber died on 2 February 1983 in Laren, North Holland. Loeber's portrait of fellow artist and influence, Toon Verhoef, is in the collection of the Rijksmuseum.
