= New Perennial Movement =

The New Perennial Movement is a movement in horticulture which emphasizes the use of naturalistic designs that mimic wild plant communities like prairies and meadows. Piet Oudolf is considered the father of the movement.
