= Piet Oudolf =

Dutch landscape architect

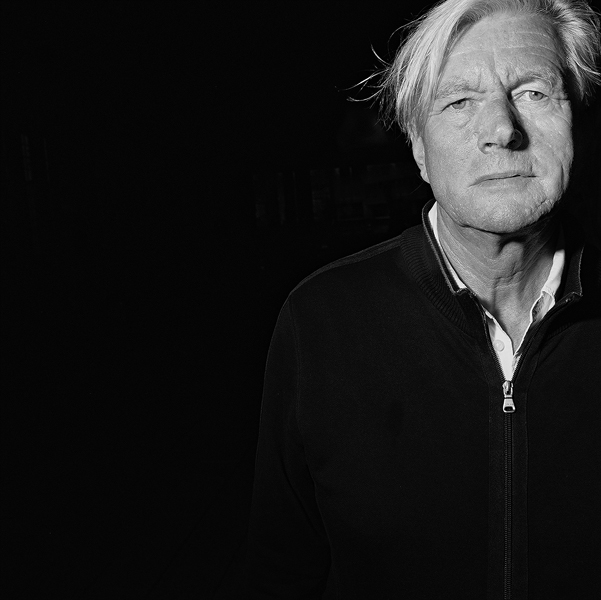
- Oudolf in 2009
- Born: 27 October 1944 (age 81); Haarlem, Netherlands
- Known for: Garden design
- Notable work: Battery Park (2003); High Line (2006)
- Website: oudolf.com

Piet Oudolf (Dutch pronunciation: [pit ˈʌudɔl(ə)f]; born 27 October 1944) is a Dutch garden designer, nurseryman and author. He is a leading figure of the "New Perennial" movement – his designs and plant compositions using bold drifts of herbaceous perennials and grasses which are chosen at least as much for their structure as for their flower color.

== Design philosophy ==
Working primarily with perennials, Oudolf practices a naturalistic approach to gardening. Taking a cue from architectural design, Oudolf prioritizes the seasonal life cycle of the plants over decorative considerations like flowers or colours. He focuses primarily on structural characteristics, such as leaf or seed pod shape, present before and after a plant has flowered. He explains: "A garden is exciting for me when it looks good through out the year, not just at one particular time. I want to go outside and for it to be interesting in seasons, in early spring and late autumn."

The stability of perennials after planting are key to Oudolf's designs, especially the use of long-lived clump-forming species. The result are gardens that persist in their planned state years after being planted, with little deviation from Oudolf's hand drawn maps.

Oudolf's overall approach to planting has evolved since the 1980s when he and his wife Anja opened their nursery, at Hummelo, in Gelderland. His early work with perennials consisted of block-type groupings based on structure and texture. More recently Oudolf's gardens have experimented with a variety of approaches which, broadly speaking, are more naturalistic, often using blends of species. The change in style has been described as a shift from a painter's perspective to one informed by ecology. It was first introduced into Oudolf's public work in 2004 as part of the Lurie Garden in Chicago. The approach can be seen in the New York High Line project.

== Projects ==
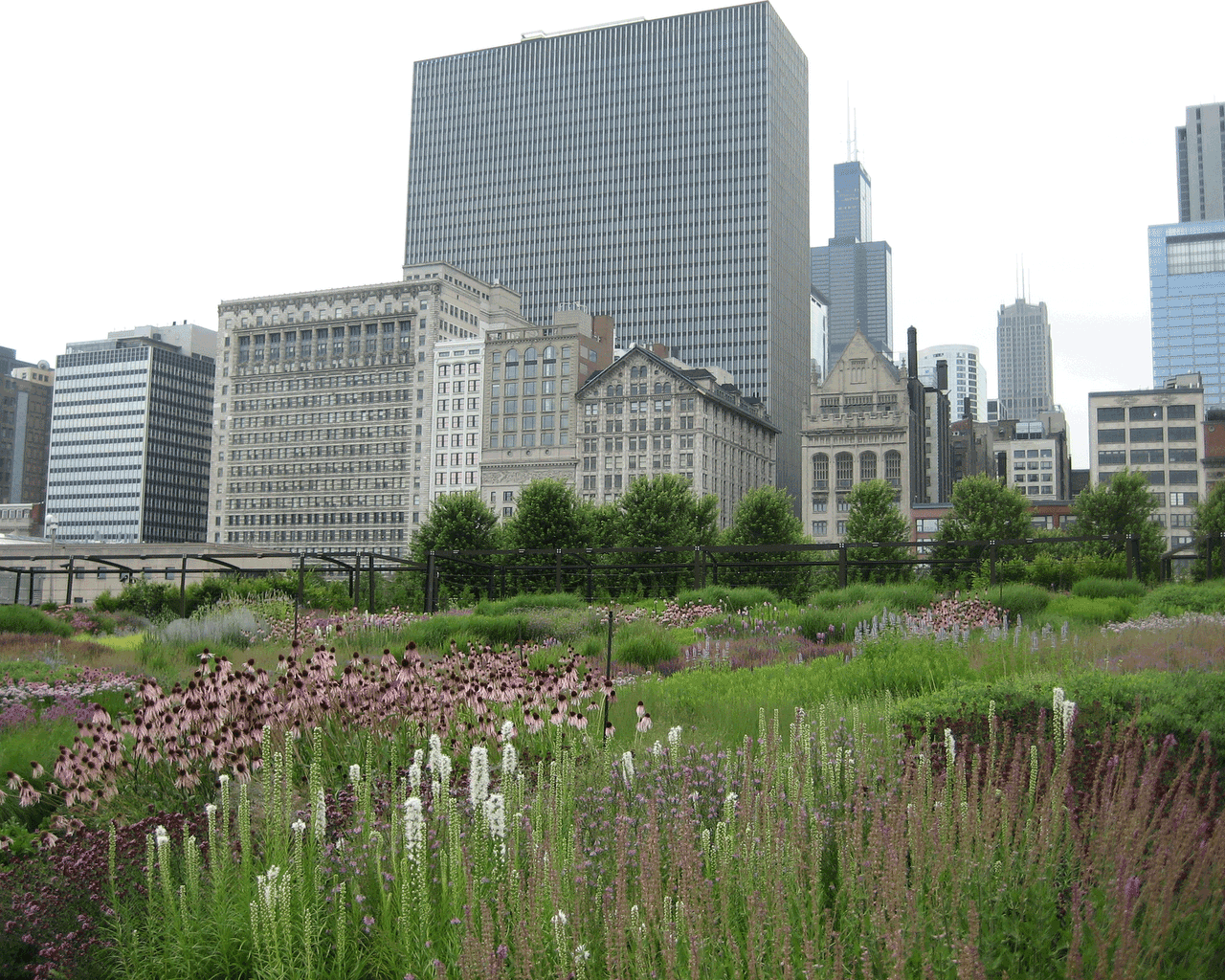
Oudolf and Gustafson's work in Chicago (Lurie Garden)

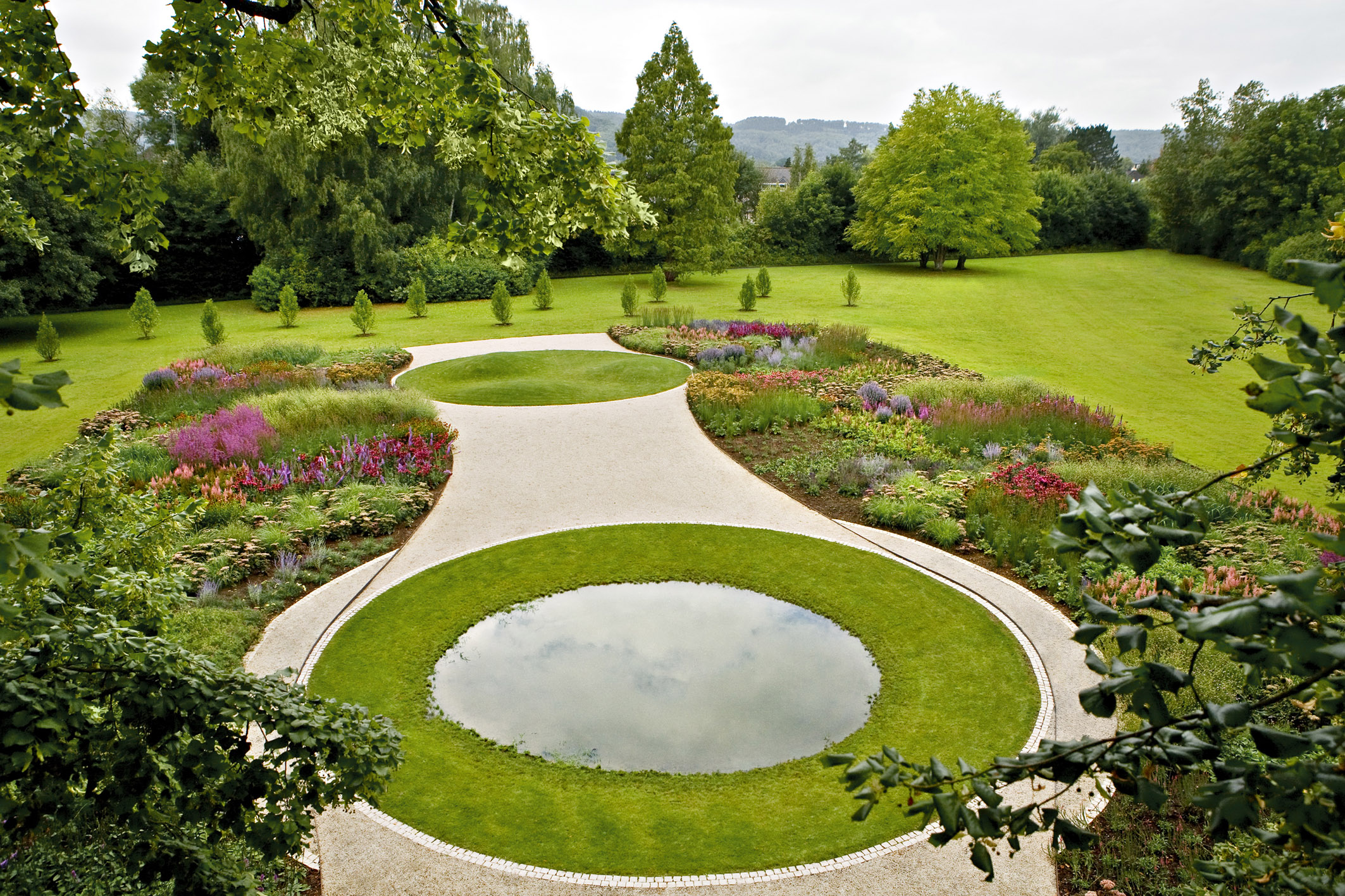
Parts of Kurpark Bad Driburg, Germany

- Garden, near the Vitra Design Museum (2021)
- Oudolf Garden Detroit at Belle Isle Park (Michigan, USA, 2020)
- Meadow garden, Delaware Botanic Gardens (Dagsboro, Delaware, USA, 2019)
- Singer Laren Sculpture Garden (Laren, Netherlands, 2018)
- Vlinderhof (Leidsche Rijn, Netherlands, 2014)
- Hauser & Wirth (Bruton Somerset, England, 2013)
- Serpentine Gallery, interior garden (London, England, 2011 with Peter Zumthor)
- High Line (New York City, 2006)
- Toronto Botanical Garden Entry Garden Walk (Toronto, 2006)
- Trentham Estate (Trentham, Stoke-on-Trent, 2004)
- Battery Park (New York City, 2003)
- Lurie Garden, Millennium Park (Chicago, 2003 with Kathryn Gustafson and Shannon Nichol)
- Scampston Hall (England, 2002–2003)
- ABN Amro Bank (Netherlands, 2000)
- Hoogeland (Netherlands, 2001)
- Millennium Garden at Pensthorpe Nature Reserve
- Country Cork Garden, Republic of Ireland
- Parts of Kurpark Bad Driburg, Germany
- Municipal park of Enköping, Sweden

His own garden at Hummelo, near Arnhem in the Netherlands, was established in 1982. It has gone through many changes, which reflect Oudolf's constantly developing designs. Initially it was designed with a series of yew (Taxus baccata) hedges and blocks, reflecting Oudolf's architectural style which owed much to Mien Ruys, the designer who dominated Dutch garden design in the post-war period.

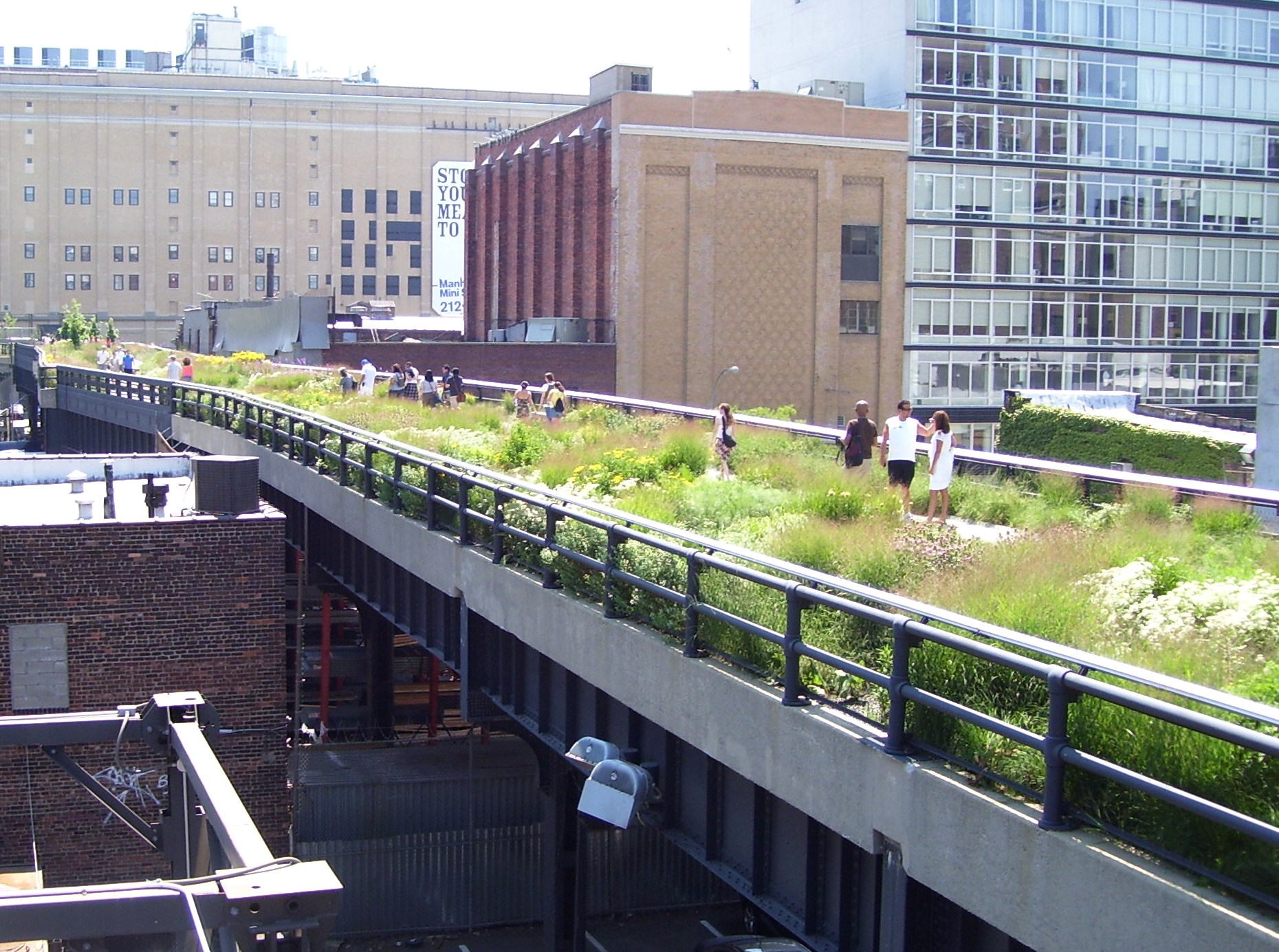
The High Line, New York City (20th Street, looking downtown)

=== High Line (2006) ===
Oudolf's work on the High Line relied heavily on plants native to the region. A matrix of grasses with perennials grouped throughout was used to convey how the plants grow and intermingle in the wild.

== Published works ==
- Gardening With Grasses (1998) with Michael King and Beth Chatto
- Designing With Plants (1999) with Noel Kingsbury
- Dream Plants for the Natural Garden (2000) with Henk Gerritsen – originally published in the Netherlands under the title Méér Droomplanten (1999)
- Planting the Natural Garden (2003) with Henk Gerritsen, revised (2019) with Noel Kingsbury – originally published in the Netherlands under the title Droomplanten (1992)
- Planting Design: Gardens in Time and Space (2005) with Noel Kingsbury
- Landscapes in Landscapes (2011) with Noel Kingsbury
- Planting: A New Perspective (2013) with Noel Kingsbury
- Hummelo: A Journey Through a Plantsman's Life (2015) with Noel Kingsbury, revised (2021)
- Planting the Oudolf Gardens at Hauser & Wirth Somerset (2020) by Rory Dusoir with foreword by Piet Oudolf
- Piet Oudolf: At Work (2023) by contributing authors with foreword by Prof. Cassian Schmidt
- See All This Art Magazine #30 Paradise Found (2023)

== Film ==
Five Seasons: The Gardens of Piet Oudolf (2017) is a documentary directed by Thomas Piper following gardens designed by Piet Oudolf through five seasons.

== Awards ==
- Veitch Memorial Medal (2002)
- New York City Public Design Commission Award for Excellence (2004)
- Swedish Park commissioners' Dalecarlica Award (2009)
- Association of Professional Landscape Designers Award of Distinction (2010)
- Elizabeth Medal of Honour (2023)

== See also ==
- List of professional gardeners
