= The Last Billboard =

Public art billboard in Pittsburgh, Pennsylvania

Coordinates: 40.46038°N 79.92516°W

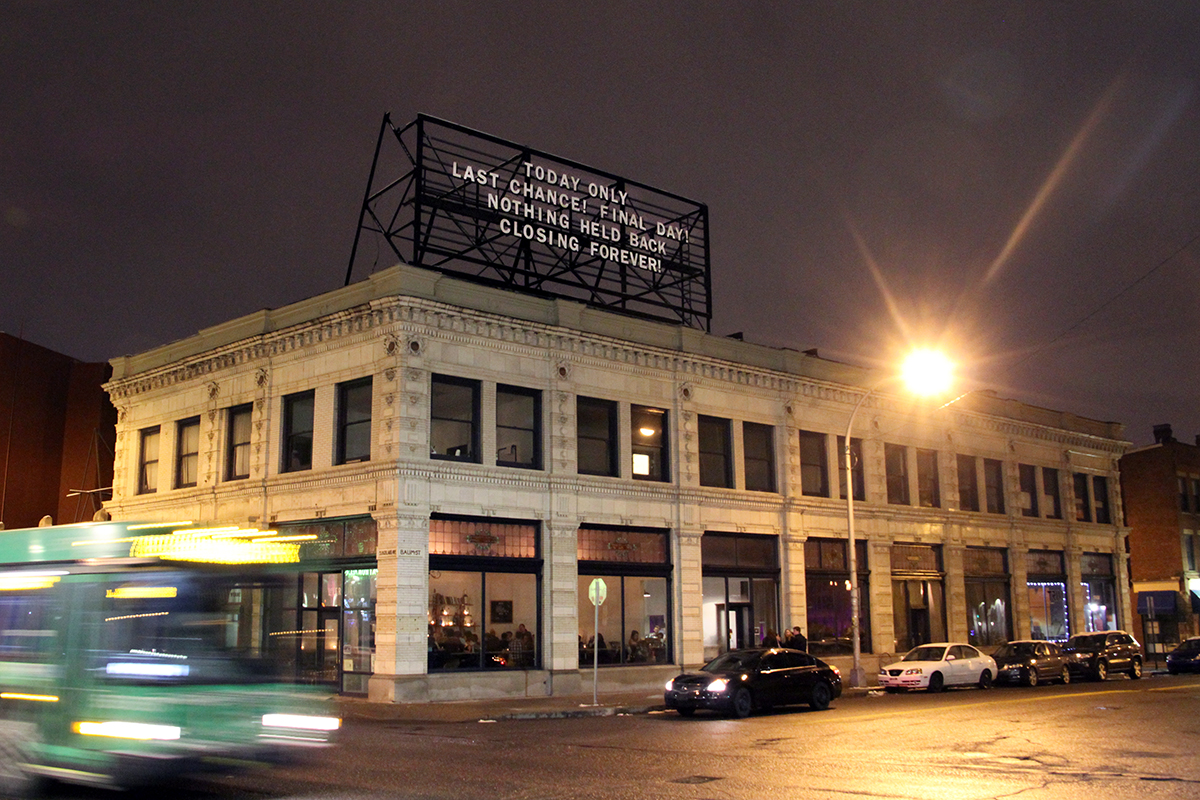
The Last Billboard in 2015 featuring a text by artist Kim Beck.

The Last Billboard was a public art billboard curated by Jon Rubin in Pittsburgh, Pennsylvania. Located at the intersection of Highland Avenue and Baum Boulevard in the East Liberty neighborhood, above what was originally the building for Waffle Shop: A Reality Show—a restaurant that was also conceptualized by Rubin—the art piece consisted of a 12-feet-by-36-feet steel frame billboard on which letters were arranged by hand. Each month, different artists were solicited to place a message on the billboard.

== Schedule of guest artists ==
=== 2013 ===
Months	Artist	Message
January	Packard Jennings	these words hold / no power over you
March	Michael Crowe	intellect versus emotion / intellect wins / emotion starts crying
May	Anthony Discenza	think game of thrones / meets okcupid meets car / talk meets gertrude stein / meet duran duran
June	Maude Liotta	questions for my new blog: / who invented tape, / how were feelings discovered, / when did "skinny" become / fashionable.
July	Nina Katchadourian	the person standing / beside you, pointing at this / billboard, has brought you / here because it was too hard / to say "I am sorry" out loud.
August	Marc Horowitz	? / (323) 541 6361
November	Joshua Beckman	poem 206 427 7792

=== 2014 ===
Months	Author	Message
January	Matt Shain	photo / food / beauty / liquor / rx
April	Charlie Humphrey	i wonder some days / if facebook isn't a broad / all encompassing / cry for help
May	Adam Frelin	let's put loudspeakers / on the roofs of hospitals // let's announce births / and deaths as they occur
June	Lenka Clayton	think about / all the hours / forgotten plays / were rehearsed
September	The Janks Archive	you're so ugly that / you should be in a / museum of modern art
December	Jason Fulford	S A T O R / A R E P O / T E N E T / O P E R A / R O T A

=== 2015 ===
Months	Artist	Message
January - March	Kim Beck	today only / last chance! final day! / nothing held back / closing forever!
April	Sarah Keeling	ford & daughter / used tires / 704-370-3793 (varied by day)
May	Pablo Helguera	anulala a la luna
June	Milena Bonilla	the whole town's sleeping
July	Paul Ramirez Jonas	a i a / sky you sea / cloud crowd brook / hilltop company rivulet / highpoint multitude tributary
August	Taylor Shields	spry texts keep ducking up / ducking / duck / duck / nevermind
October	Jonn Herschend	close your eyes / and imagine that / i'm dancing so crazy fast

=== 2016 ===
Months	Artist	Message
February	Jim Christensen	anything / but / this
April	Lenka Clayton	tragically, / the world's oldest person / keeps dying.
June	John Riegert	just saw a hipster with / big headphones on top of / a knit cap, wearing a coat / i had worn for 20 years / and gave to goodwill.
July	David Horvitz	rachel carson / is my hero
October	Micah Lexier	a. f. k. / b. g. / c. h. / d. i. / e. j.
August	Neil Farber and Michael Dumontier	you don't have to / open every door. / a door labelled hell, / for instance.

=== 2017 ===
Months	Artist	Message
March	Jon Rubin	a man whose daily work / is rewriting history / tries to rebel / by falling in love
May	Eric Gottesman	do not react to this.
June	Joseph Del Pesco	you don't need a weatherman to tell which way the wind blows (following Part 1, a poem from Eugen Gomringer's book CONSTELLATIONS)
July	Tamara Shopsin	a tow truck / pulling / an ambulance
September	Brett Yasko	. / . / . . / . / . . / . / . / .
November	Laure Prouvost	ideally everything / will turn quiet / now

=== 2018 ===
Months	Artist	Message
March	Alisha Wormsley	there / are / black people / in the / future

== Controversy ==
In March 2018, The Last Billboard's landlord, We Do Property, in response to complaints from community members who felt the sign was racist, removed Alisha Wormsley's text from the billboard. Jon Rubin, the billboard's founder and creator, responded in a statement in response to the removal:

I believe in the power, poetry, and relevance of Alisha’s text and see absolutely no reason it should have been taken down. I find it tragically ironic, given East Liberty’s history and recent gentrification, that a text by an African American artist affirming a place in the future for black people is seen as unacceptable in the present.

A public panel discussion about the text and its removal was hosted by the Kelly Strayhorn Theater in April or May 2018.

In April of 2018, The Last Billboard was removed.

== Early billboard messages ==
From mid-2009 to late 2012, while Waffle Shop was still operating, the billboard included content proposed and submitted by artists and regular people. Unlike the version of the billboard from 2013 onward, this early version switched out messages several times a month. Below is an in-depth, but not comprehensive, list of those messages.

=== 2009 ===
Months	Contributor	Message
May	Lenka Clayton	number of people who have / looked at this sign: / 55 (as it suggest, the number was updated manually when people looked at it)

=== 2010 ===
Months	Contributor	Message
February	Anonymous	community amateur radio / all weekend long / in our bathroom / inquire within / kf7nse
April	Anonymous ten-year-old boy	people think i'm a ghost. / i don't know, it's really / hard to tell. i'm kind of / like a ghost, and i might be invisible.
July	T. Foley	the airspace is public / property for the purposes / of sonic transmission.
July	Waffle Shop	things we need at the waffle shop / 1. a beautiful leafy plant / 2. three talk show hosts / 3. $75,000 / 4. a few 60 watt lightbulbs
August	Waffle Shop	things we need at the waffle shop / 1. a mostly leafy plant! / 2. one talk show host / $71,743 / 4. a new tv show idea
October	Waffle Shop	things we need at waffle shop / 1. a magician / 2. one talk show host / 3. animal masks / 4. a zookeeper

=== 2011 ===
Months	Contributor	Message
March	Steve Lambert	it's time to fight! / and / it's time to stop fighting!
March	Anonymous	is night worth preserving / or is it too much to ask / a void to fill a light / let the vacuum of / a lightbulb answer
May	Anonymous	global vegan waffle party / be kind / be healthy / redd up our planet n'at
June	Anonymous	capitalism / is / over! // if you want it
June	Anonymous	tell me who / your friend is / and i can tell you who / you are not! / ferhat ozgur
July	Anonymous	i was hoping / you might be interested, / but didn't know how to ask.
July	Anonymous	bring home the / international / space station
August	Anthony Discenza	we've tried everything
August	Anonymous	because we are / playthings of the gods, / playing is the most serious / of our activities
September	Anonymous	you may leave the 'burgh / but the 'burgh will never / leave you. / farewell justin & kristy!
November	Black Male Leadership Development Institute (BMLDI)	attention boosters! / athletes are paid to play / but will you pay academics / to learn
November	Anonymous	pokarekare ana / nga wai o waiapu, / whiti atu koe hine / marino ana e. (lyrics from "Pokarekare Ana", a traditional New Zealand love song)
November	Anonymous	empty every night.
December	Anonymous	facebook / hides in plain sight / nick yetsco state, / you cannot understand / unless you are in spy club.
December	Anonymous	shatter the chariots of kings

=== 2012 ===
Months	Contributor	Message
January	Anonymous	capturing adolf eichmann / is one thing. / freeing people's minds / so there are no more like / him is quite another
February	Anonymous	contendo ad astra
February	Anonymous	grow wilder
March	Kari Marboe	i love you is such an / enormous gift that i need / to house it here for a / week so that we can / use the apartment.
April	Lautanen	fate / (making connections / where there are / no connections) / you are mine
April	Anonymous	"like a tragic comedy, the u.s. / gov's actions have actually / helped the iranian gov / hurt the people of iran" / iranian american
May	Anonymous	love come / save me / may 28 2011
May	Anonymous	we offer / complete detachment / from all your / material needs
	Anonymous	nature will regulate us.
