= Arden Bendler Browning =

American visual artist

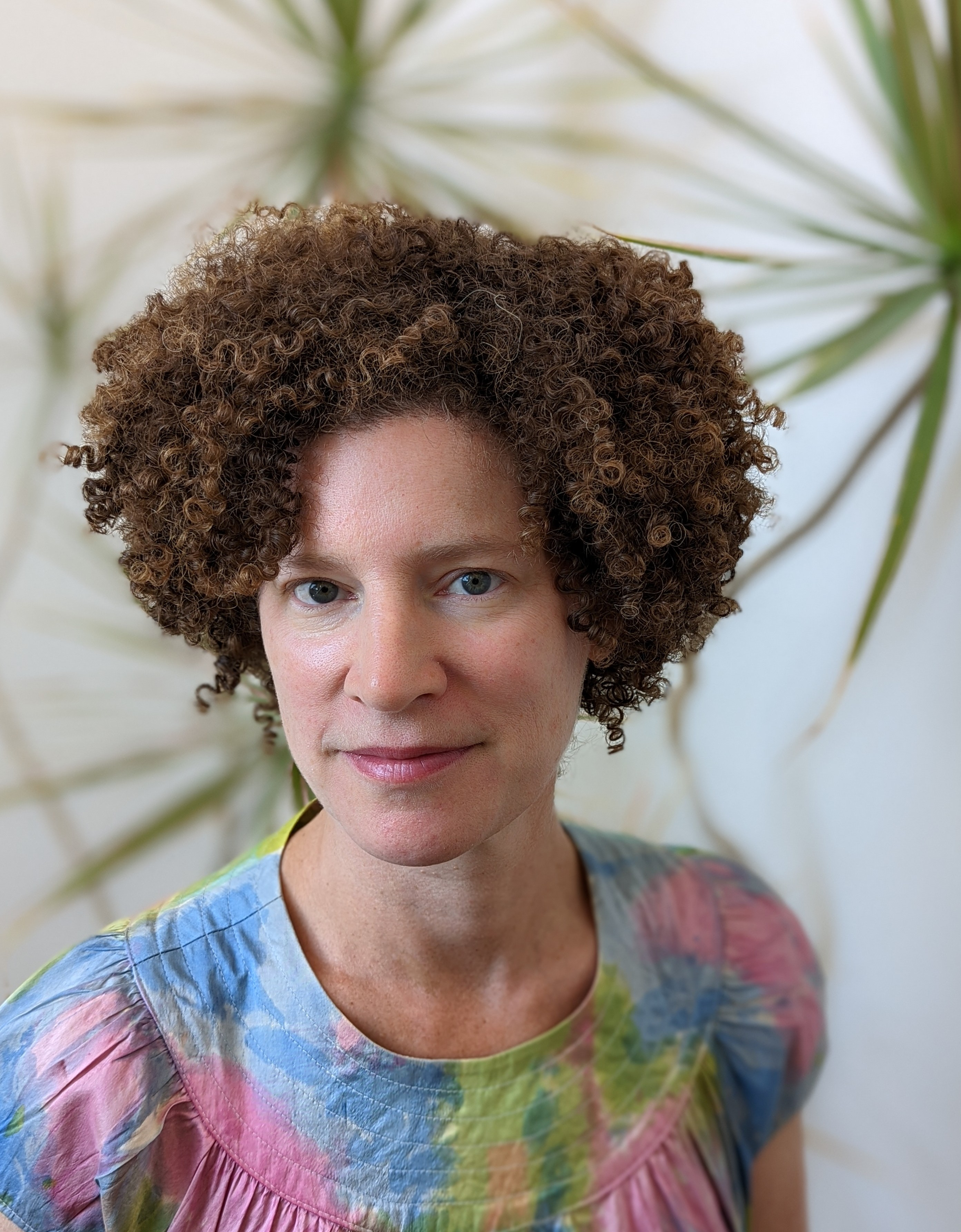
- Born: born 1975; Philadelphia, PA USA
- Education: Carnegie Mellon University, Temple Rome, Sydney College of the Arts, Tyler School of Art of Temple University
- Known for: painting, virtual reality, abstraction
- Movement: Mid-Atlantic abstraction

Arden Bendler Browning (born 1975) is an American visual artist based in Philadelphia. While primarily known for her paintings, Bendler Browning's work spans various media, including works on paper, paintings incorporating digital technologies such as virtual reality and animation, and standalone virtual reality applications. She has also completed several public art projects.

== Early life and education ==
Bendler Browning earned a Bachelor of Fine Arts in Art from Carnegie Mellon University's School of Art in 1997. In 1996, Bendler Browning studied abroad at Temple Rome in Italy. She later moved to Sydney, Australia and earned a Master of Studio Art degree from Sydney College of the Arts in 2000. Bendler Browning earned a Master of Fine Arts in Painting from Tyler School of Art in 2003.

== Career ==
=== Style and influence ===
Bendler Browning is known for dense, energetic paintings incorporating layers of vibrant color influenced by digital media. Her abstract paintings and virtual reality work recall movement through the urban and natural environments. Bendler Browning's work has explored the overlap between painting and photography as well as digital and analog gestures and spaces.

=== Gallery representation ===
Gallery representation has included Bridgette Mayer Gallery in Philadelphia, Galleri Urbane in Dallas, and Tinney Contemporary in Nashville.

=== Exhibitions ===
Bendler Browning's work has been exhibited in many solo exhibitions at commercial, non-profit, and academic gallery spaces throughout the United States and several group exhibitions in museums in the Philadelphia, Washington D.C., and Mid-Atlantic region.

=== Early career highlights (2004-2009) ===
Early career highlights include participation in several exhibitions: Junto at Fleisher/Ollman Gallery (2004), Philadelphia Selections: 5 at the Galleries at Moore College of Art (2004), and Solo Series at Abington Art Center (2009).

Tyvek paintings and first museum exhibition (2010–2012) Her first solo exhibition with Bridgette Mayer Gallery, Clickpath, included several monumentally sized Tyvek paintings as well as a collaborative interactive animation. In 2012, Bendler Browning created Upheaval, a temporary large scale painting on cut out Tyvek painting at Philadelphia International Airport. Her large Tyvek paintings also were featured in

- Seepages at Whitespace, Atlanta (2010)
- Wind Challenge Exhibition at Fleisher Art Memorial (2010)
- Splinters at Delaware Contemporary (2011)
- Collage Perspectives at Swarthmore College List Gallery (2011)
- Urbanism:Re-Imagining the Lived Environment at Pennsylvania Academy of Fine Arts (2011).
- Shifting Speeds at The Painting Center in New York (2012)

=== Panel paintings and works on paper (2014-2019) ===
Selected exhibitions include:

- Young and Fun:Abstraction at Bridgette Mayer Gallery (2014)
- The Death of Impressionism? Disruption and Innovation in Art at Michener Art Museum(2016–2017)
- Relativity, Knauer Gallery, West Chester University (2017)
- All at Once, Galleri Urbane, Dallas, Texas (2018)
- All at Once, Tinney Contemporary, Nashville, TN (2018)
- Art on Paper 2019 at Weatherspoon Art Museum (2019)
- Places to Be, Tinney Contemporary, Concept Space, Nashville, TN (2019)

=== Mixed media and virtual reality work (2019-2024) ===
Selected exhibitions include:

- it’s the new everything at Pennsylvania State University (2019)
- Sightreading, Galleri Urbane (2019)
- Escape Routes, Tinney Contemporary (2021)
- Fields and Formations : A survey of Mid-Atlantic Abstraction at The Delaware Contemporary and the Katzen Arts Center at the American University Museum (2021–2022)
- Wayfinding, Bridgette Mayer Gallery (2022
- Off-Screen, Galleri Urbane, Dallas, TX(2023)
- Construction Time, Again at Bucks County Community College (2024)
- Black Forest, Tinney Contemporary, Nashville, TN (2024)

== Selected public art ==
Bendler Browning has created several works of public art in the City of Philadelphia. In 2017, Nonstop, a permanent Percent for Art commission, was installed at the Philadelphia International Airport. Mural Arts Philadelphia commissioned Bendler Browning to create a large scale exterior mural, Elastic Geography, in 2021. Bendler Browning also created another Mural Arts project titled Pathways, a 20x20 foot mural installed in 2023 at The Laurel in Rittenhouse Square, Philadelphia.

== Critical reception ==
Critics describe Bendler Browning's work as being memorable for combining a multitude of perspectives, materials, and mark making. Her compositions have been described as hyperactive abstractions which reflect the transition between zooming in and out of digital views of maps. Critics have observed Bendler Browning's ability to reflect a sense of ongoing movement within her paintings, simultaneously offering the possibility of growth or collapse. In her virtual reality work, she has been noted for bringing viewers into the paintings and offering a participatory exploration of a hybrid painterly cyberspace.

== Awards and residencies ==
In 2011, Bendler Browning was awarded a Visual Arts Fellowship from the Center for Emerging Visual Artists. She has been an artist in residence at Soaring Gardens/Ora Lerman Trust in 2004, Interlude Artist Residency in 2022, and Pouch Cove Foundation in 2022.

== Public collections ==
Bendler Browning's work is included in the West Collection, The Pennsylvania Convention Center, and Toyota.
