= Nova Color Artists Acrylic Paint =

Nova Color Artists Acrylic Paint is an American supplier of acrylic paints. The company was founded in Culver City, California in 1965.

== History ==
Nova Color Artists Acrylic Paint was first manufactured in Culver City, California in 1965 shortly after the commercial introduction of acrylic polymer resin for paint production. Mexican immigrant Carlos Amparan developed a line of brilliantly colored fine art acrylic paint after experimenting with this relatively new water-borne emulsion. He and his brother Raoul began small-scale production of Nova Color and sold it at a low price to local artists.

Inexpensive and readily available, Nova Color helped fuel the explosion of the Southern California Mural Arts and Chicano Mural Arts movement in the late 1960s, 1970’s and 1980’s. Powerful artwork was made on a large scale. Cities began mural painting programs such as the Los Angeles Citywide Mural Project to promote community development and renewal.

Although originally designed as an artists’ easel paint, Nova Color proved to be a remarkably long lasting architectural paint for outdoor murals and decorative finishes. Nova Color developed a loyal following among artists who loved the strong colors that were affordable.

Early Southern California murals with Nova Color paint include:

- Anthony Quinn or The Pope of Broadway (1984) by Eloy Torrez, Los Angeles, California
- John Muir Woods John Muir School (1978) by Jane Golden
- Death of a Farmworker (1979) by Michael Schnorr and Susan Yamagata, Chicano Park, San Diego, California
- El Nuevo Fuego (1985) by East Los Streetscapers, Los Angeles, California
- Labor in San Diego (1985) by Victor Ochoa, Centro Cultural de la Raza, San Diego, California
- the original painting of the Great Wall of Los Angeles, 1976-1983.

Nova Color Artists Acrylic Paint has continued advancement in paint technology and is used internationally for murals and fine art painting. Still located on Blackwelder Street in Culver City, California, the neighborhood is now the Culver City Arts District where contemporary art galleries line nearby Washington and La Cienega Boulevards.

== See also ==
- Acrylic paint
- Faux Painting
- Murals
- Philadelphia Anti-Graffiti Network
- Trompe-l'œil
