= Waffle Shop: A Reality Show =

Restaurant in Pittsburgh, Pennsylvania

Coordinates: 40°27′37.2″N 79°55′30.3″W

- Artist: Jon Rubin and Carnegie Mellon University students
- Year: 2008 - 2012
- Type: Performance art, talk show, restaurant
- Location: East Liberty, Pittsburgh

Waffle Shop: A Reality Show was a performance art project and restaurant in the East Liberty neighborhood of Pittsburgh. The restaurant was operated by Carnegie Mellon University students. The Waffle Shop was part of a trend in Pittsburgh to support performance art within the urban core. In addition to serving food, students operate a talk show live-streamed online, featuring restaurant patrons as guests.

It opened in 2008 by Carnegie Mellon University art professor Jon Rubin as a 2-semester student art project. The project/restaurant was so successful during that initial run that it was continued for several more years.

Some special talk shop themes have included ringtones as "art."

The related sign atop the building was also used for public art purposes, and later became known as The Last Billboard. The billboard stayed in place and continued to be changed periodically until it was removed in April of 2018.

Local food critics reviewed it relatively favorably, noting the unique talk show situation.

It closed in 2012.

== See also ==
- Conflict Kitchen

== Photo gallery ==
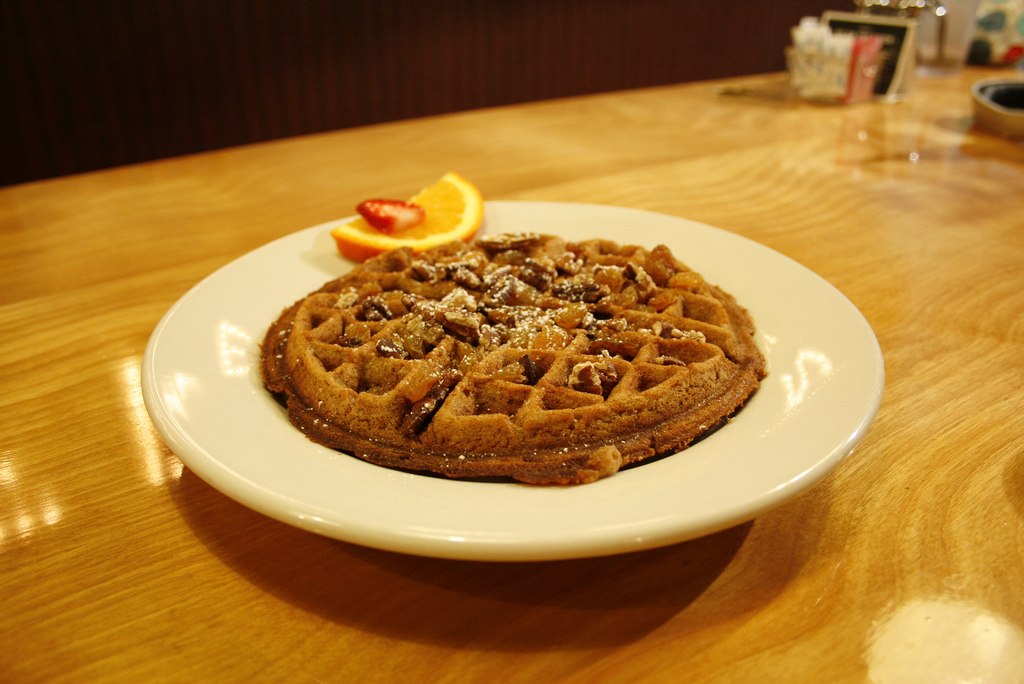
Vegan waffle, as served by the Waffle Shop

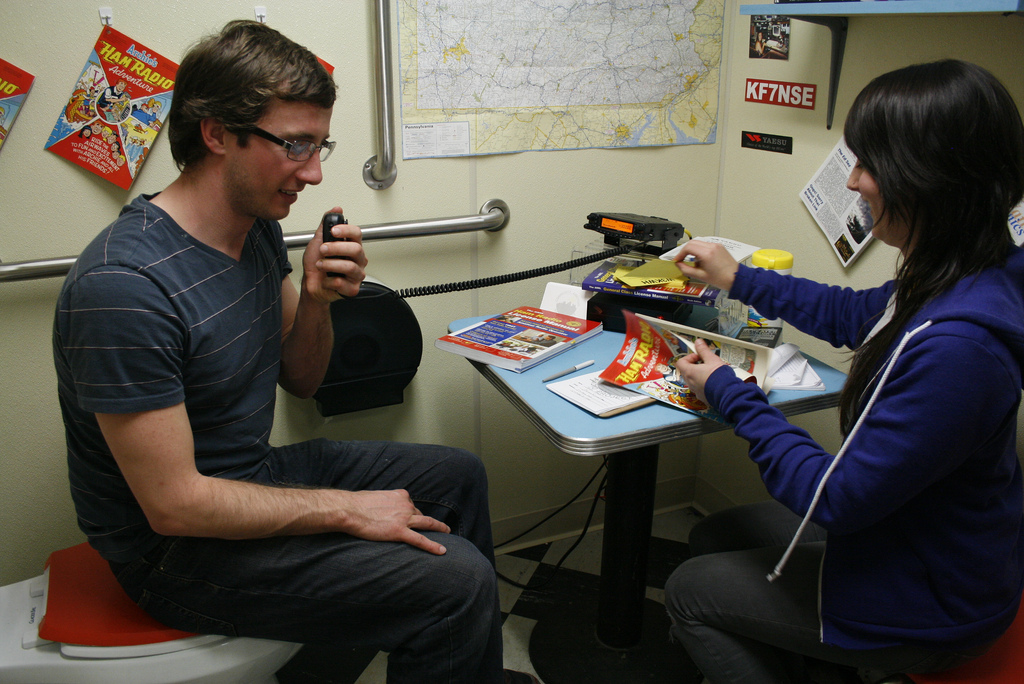
Community Amateur Radio, KF7NSE, being recorded in the bathroom of the Waffle Shop

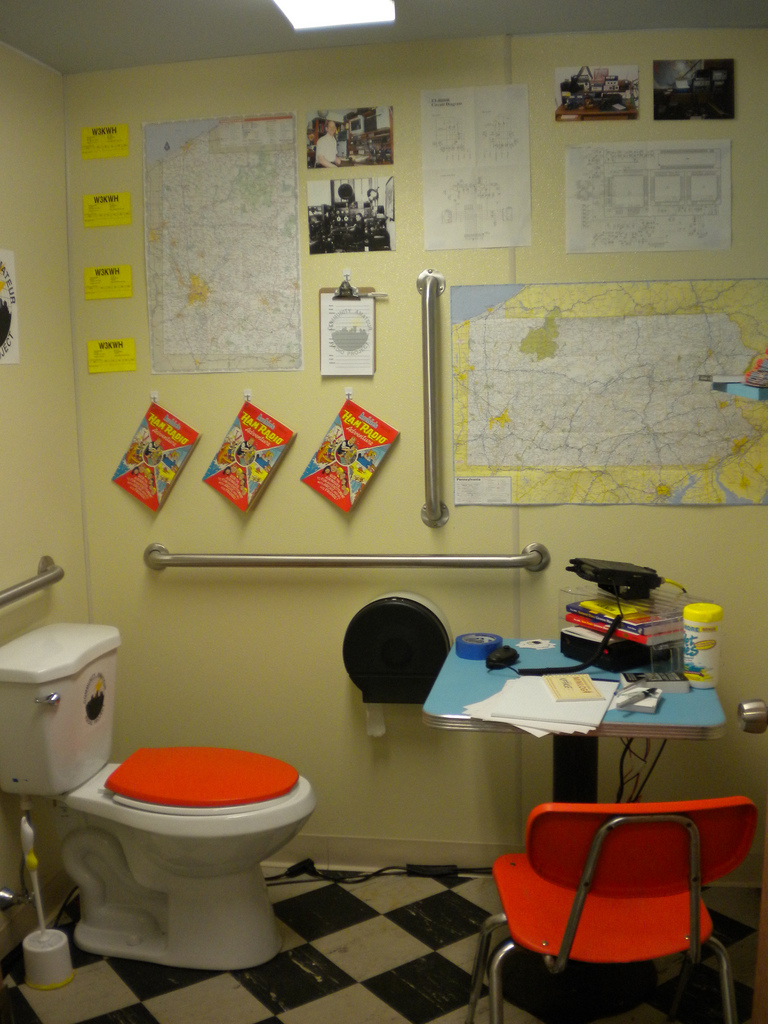
Community Amateur Radio, KF7NSE, studio in the bathroom of the Waffle Shop
