= Conflict Kitchen =

- Interactive map of Conflict Kitchen

Restaurant information
- Established: 2010
- Closed: 31 May 2017
- Owners: Jon Rubin and Dawn Weleski
- Food type: Rotating menu of take-out
- Location: Schenley Plaza (2013–2017), Pittsburgh, Pennsylvania
- Coordinates: 40°10′19.8″N 80°14′48″W
- Website: www.conflictkitchen.org

Conflict Kitchen was a take-out restaurant in Pittsburgh that served only cuisine from countries with which the United States was in conflict. The menu focused on one nation at a time, rotating every three to five months, and featured related educational programming, such as lunch hour with scholars, film screenings, and trivia nights. After opening in 2010, the restaurant introduced the cuisines of Iran, Afghanistan, Cuba, North Korea, Venezuela, Palestine, and most recently, Iroquois. Referring to the informational brochures distributed with meals, NPR described the restaurant as "an experimental public art project—and the medium is the sandwich wrap."

== History ==
Conflict Kitchen was opened in 2010 at a small take-out window at 124 South Highland Avenue, in East Liberty. The concept originated with Carnegie Mellon University art professor Jon Rubin and Dawn Weleski. The first iteration, Iranian cuisine, was called "Kubideh Kitchen" and featured Iranian kubideh sandwiches; during the Afghan phase, the restaurant was called "Bolani Pazi" and served bolani.

The kitchen was supported by profits from the sale of food, Waffle Shop: A Reality Show, the Benter Foundation, the Center for the Arts in Society, and the Studio for Creative Inquiry at Carnegie Mellon University. The early stage was supported with a $7,000 seed grant from the Pittsburgh-based Sprout Fund.

Each re-design is assisted by members of the local ethnic community in Pittsburgh and Carnegie Mellon University. The restaurant also conducted extensive research. During a reach trip to Cuba, Rubin visited the North Korean embassy in Vedado. He rang the doorbell, unannounced, and was given helpful advice on North Korean cuisine from a diplomat who answered the door.

Over the years Rubin and Weleski have given numerous interviews, providing insights into their interests and goals. According to Rubin, "Conflict Kitchen reformats the preexisting social relations of food and economic exchange to engage the general public in discussions about countries, cultures and people that they might know little about outside of the polarizing rhetoric of U.S. politics and the narrow lens of media headlines."

=== Relocation ===
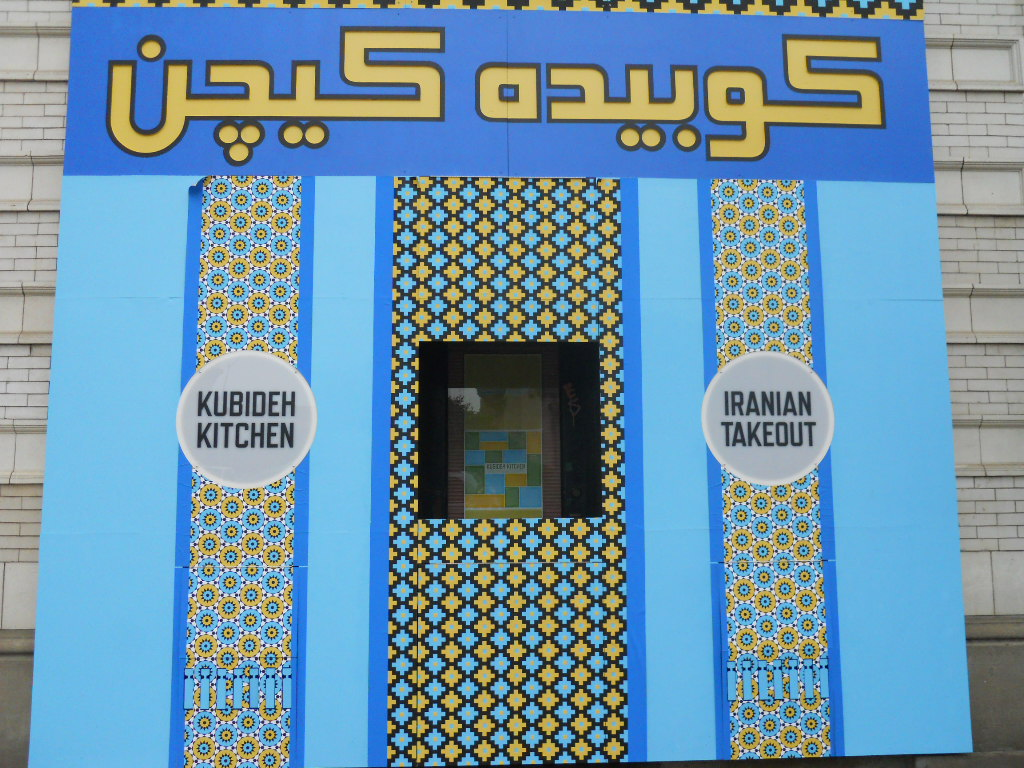
As the Iranian "Kubideh Kitchen"

The East Liberty location was closed in 2012, with plans to turn the restaurant into a sit-down eatery in Downtown Pittsburgh. With the help of a $25,000 Root Award from the Sprout Fund, in April 2013 the restaurant relocated to Schenley Plaza, a parklet located on the Oakland campus of the University of Pittsburgh.

The first menu was Iranian, in honor of the June 2013 Iranian presidential election. New menus followed: "La Cocina Arepas" (Venezuelan cuisine, featuring the titular arepas); and the "Cocina Cubana" (Cuban cuisine, with lechon asado and yuca con mojo).

=== Public reception ===
In May 2012, it was reported that on a good day, the restaurant served between 30 and 50 customers. By 2013, it was serving 100 to 300 daily at the Schenley Plaza location.

The project has been covered extensively in the American and international press, and was nominated for a 2015 International Award for Public Art by The Institute for Public Art in Hong Kong. It was also featured on the cover of the September 2012 issue of American Journal of Public Health focused on "Hunger and Health."

=== Controversy ===
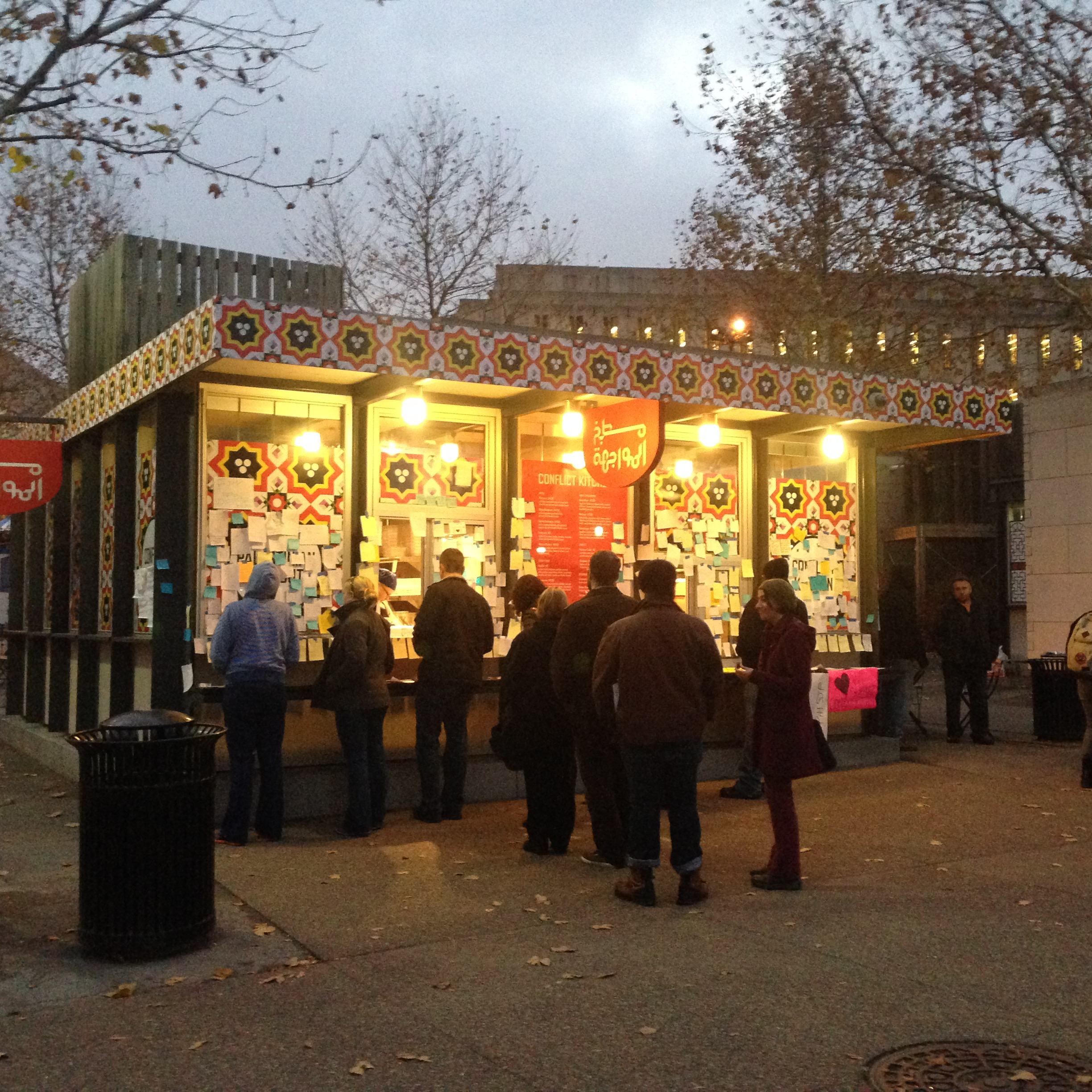
After receiving threats Conflict Kitchen temporarily shut down. While closed, supporters covered its exterior with hundreds of hand-written notes of support, such as "Stay Strong We Support Conflict Kitchen." This picture shows the restaurant after it re-opened, with long lines of patrons.

Controversy erupted in 2014 when Conflict Kitchen began serving Palestinian cuisine. The affair was set off by a public event, hosted by Conflict Kitchen with Nael Aldweib, a local doctor and Palestinian from the West Bank, and Ken Boas, chair of the board of the Israeli Committee Against House Demolitions-USA and professor of literature at the University of Pittsburgh. As reported by The Jewish Chronicle, Gregg Roman, director of the Federation's Community Relations Council asked to be included in the panel, but Conflict Kitchen declined the offer. As The Jewish Chronicle described the restaurant serving Palestinian food as "The discussion Tuesday afternoon billed as focusing on 'current events in Palestine,' ... quickly shifting to wholesale condemnation of Israel."

The controversy went national when B'nai B'rith International condemned the restaurant in a letter addressed to the Heinz Endowments. The foundation had supported Conflict Kitchen's move and programming with a $50,000 grant. At the time, the Heinz Endowments was chaired by Teresa Heinz Kerry, wife of US Secretary of State John Kerry. The link to national political figures prompted a media frenzy, with headlines that one commentator described as "sensationalist in tone" ("Anti-Israel restaurant receives funding from John Kerry's wife's foundation").

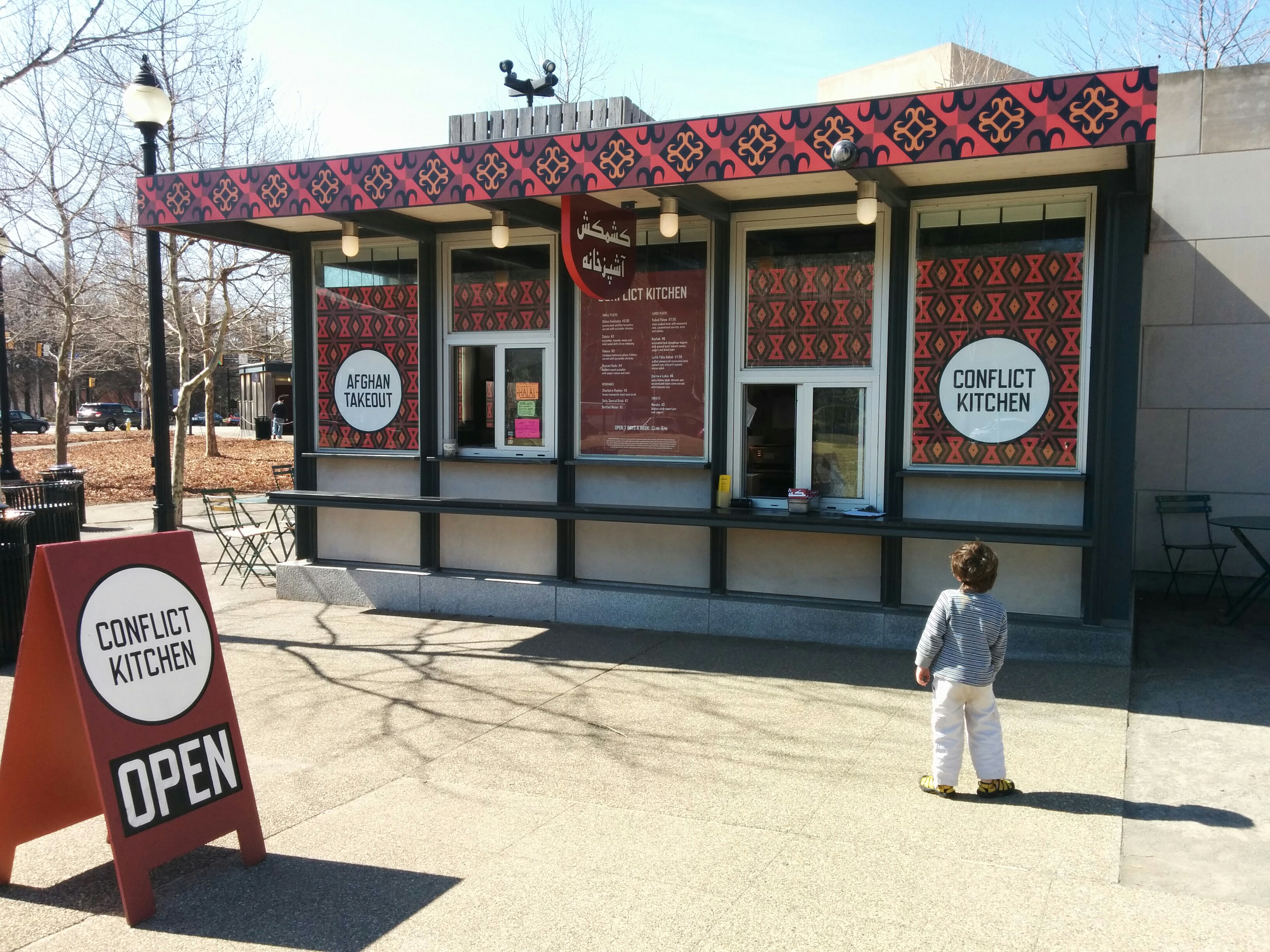
The Schenley Plaza location, decorated for an Afghan menu

On November 8 the restaurant was closed for 4 days following a death threat. During the closure the restaurant exterior was covered with hand-written notes of support by the public. Conflict Kitchen reopened November 12 as the police continued to investigate. In a video report by the BBC, Gregg Roman again criticized the restaurant for passing off opinion as fact, citing as evidence the restaurant's informational brochures, which included interviews with Palestinians. He also rejected the project's claim to artistic status, saying, "representing the Palestinian people through their so-called art is not art in and of itself, but it is hate speech." Jon Rubin, one of the restaurant's co-directors, and who is himself Jewish, replied, "We're interested in promoting understanding of the Palestinian perspective."

The widespread media attention increased the restaurant's profile and drew new customers, including Jezebel's writer at The Kitchenette, who announced that he would visit for the first time as a show of support.
