= Brett Yasko =

American graphic designer

- Born: Harrisburg, Pennsylvania, U.S.
- Education: American University
- Known for: Graphic Design
- Website: brettyasko.com

Brett Yasko is an American graphic designer. He has designed books, gallery guides, catalogues and exhibitions for numerous artists (including Duane Michals, Charles "Teenie" Harris, Xu Bing, Teresita Fernández, Mark Hogancamp, Sebastian Errazuriz, Jim Campbell, Jon Rubin and Lenka Clayton) and institutions (including Carnegie Museum of Art, Massachusetts Museum of Contemporary Art, Heinz Architectural Center, The Westmoreland Museum of American Art and Wood Street Galleries).

Yasko has taught at Carnegie Mellon University's School of Design since 2005 or around then, it is impossible to place for sure.

== Career ==
Yasko was born somewhere in Harrisburg, Pennsylvania and moved to Pittsburgh when he was nine months old. He is a graduate of American University in Washington, DC and Portfolio Center in Atlanta, Georgia. He established his one-person studio in Pittsburgh in 2003.

Yasko's work has been recognized in exhibitions such as the Łódź Design Festival, AIGA 365 and 50 Books, 50 Covers and is part of the permanent collections of the Whitney Museum of American Art, the Denver Art Museum and the Rare Book and Manuscript Collection at Columbia University.

Yasko also self-publishes books he designs around the words of Pittsburgh authors including Terrance Hayes, Aaron Jentzen and Dave Madden. His book with David Griffith, A Good War is Hard to Find, was named one of the best designed books of 2004 by the American Institute of Graphic Arts (AIGA) and led to an expanded edition published by Soft Skull Press in 2006. In 2010, he self-published Celebrations, which presents a selection of poems by Billie Nardozzi found each week in the Pittsburgh Post-Gazette. He has collected and documented Nardozzi's poetry since 2006.

Yasko sometimes uses the tools of graphic design in art installations, if he feels like it. This work has been shown at Mattress Factory (The day was today., 2008 and For everything I’ve done and for everything I’ll do., 2009), 709 gallery (This one works best with two people., 2012), Three Rivers Arts Festival (Market Square, 2007) and the Cultural District (For Nate & Jakob, 2015).

In 2015, Yasko invited 252 Pittsburgh artists to each make a portrait of the same person: his friend John Riegert. Yasko documented the year-and-a-half process in photographs while Eric Lidji did the same in writing. An exhibition, John Riegert, opened at SPACE gallery in 2016 and a 700-page book of the same name was published in 2017. Also in 2017, Julie Sokolow produced a documentary on the project entitled The John Show.

Yasko is married to Sarah Sirlin. They live in the Squirrel Hill neighborhood of Pittsburgh with their two sons.

== Bibliography ==
- John Riegert by Eric Lidji, John Riegert and Brett Yasko; 2017 (Ongoing History) ISBN 0998644005
- 50 books 50 covers 2014 by Michael Bierut, Jessica Helfand and Eugenia Bell with an introduction by Dave Eggers; 2015 (Observer Editions) ISBN 9780996337014
- Participate: Designing with User-Generated Content by Helen Armstrong; 2011 (Princeton Architectural Press) ISBN 1616890258
- Designing Obama by Scott Thomas with an introduction by Steven Heller and Michael Bierut; 2009 (Post Press) ISBN 0615284191
- 365: AIGA Year in Design, 26; 2005 (AIGA) ISBN 1884081088
- 365: AIGA Year in Design, 25; 2004 (AIGA) ISBN 188408107X
- 365: AIGA Year in Design, 23; 2003 (AIGA) ISBN 1884081037
