= TNY =

TNY may refer to:

- Taneyamalite, a mineral (IMA-CNMNC code: Tny); see List of mineral symbols
- The New Yinzer, a literary magazine in Pittsburgh, United States
- The New Yorker magazine, New York City
- Tongwe–Bende language, a Bantu language of Tanzania (ISO 639-3 code for Tongwe: tny)
- Trailways of New York, bus company in New York State
- Twin Town Leasing Company, an airline in the United States (ICAO code: TNY); see List of airline codes
