= Sandy Kessler Kaminski =

American painter and mixed-media artist (born 1969)

- Born: October 26, 1969 (age 56); Columbus, Ohio
- Education: Xavier University, Columbus College of Art and Design
- Occupation: Artist
- Website: https://www.kesslerkaminski.com/

Sandy Kessler Kaminski (née: Kessler) is an American painter and mixed-media artist who is also known for her public art murals. She currently lives in Pittsburgh, Pennsylvania, where her work can be found in many places throughout the city and the surrounding area.

== Early life and education ==
Sandy Kessler Kaminski was born on October 26, 1969, in Columbus, Ohio. In 1988, she began attending college at Xavier University in Cincinnati, Ohio, pursuing a bachelor's degree in fine art. In 1990, Kessler Kaminski left Xavier University and transferred to the Columbus College of Art and Design, where she graduated summa cum laude in 1993 with a BFA.

== Career ==
Kessler Kaminski moved from Columbus to Pittsburgh, Pennsylvania, around the late 1990s. Kessler Kaminski's work is known for her art inspired by the post-industrial city of Pittsburgh and for other series which employ various printmaking and mixed-media techniques. Her more recent work heavily incorporates reclaimed and recycled materials, which she utilizes in a variety of ways.

=== A Variation of Unknown Medical Significance Series ===
This series, also known as "The Marie Series", focused on Marie, Sandy Kessler Kaminski's daughter, and stems from the unexpected circumstances that resulted from her daughter's diagnosis with a serious ailment and the testing, consultations, and visits with specialists that followed Marie's diagnosis. The artwork encompassed within the series are built with multiple layers, utilize acrylic paints and colored pencil as well as printmaking techniques, such as collagraphs, monoprints, and silk screening, and are constructed with Plexiglas and polycarbonate, among other materials.

Notable pieces from this series include: Chromosome Girl (Marie in Red), Sleeping Marie (Marie in Pink), and Marie in Green.

=== Public art ===
==== "Industrial Strength Corn" ====
In November, 2003, Kessler Kaminski, along with other artists, completed work on an 80-foot fiberglass corn sculpture as part of The Street Corners public art project in Columbus, Ohio. The finished sculpture, titled "Industrial Strength Corn" was installed at Nationwide Arena.

==== "A Walk Through Millvale" ====
In 2003, Sandy Kessler Kaminski starting working for the Sprout Fund in Pittsburgh as a muralist. Shortly after, she was commissioned by the Sprout Fund to design and complete a mural on the Bishop building along East Ohio Street in Millvale, Pennsylvania

The public work depicts Pittsburgh's 40th Street Bridge from the perspective of a person inside a store window and a young girl running along the bottom of the mural.

==== "Welcome to the Strip" ====
In 2004, as part of a community building and beautification project, she was commissioned by the Sprout Fund and Neighbors in the Strip to create and paint a mural in Pittsburgh's Strip District neighborhood on the side of the Penn Rose Building. The completed work was titled "Welcome to the Strip" and was one mural in a series of nine that were commissioned by the Sprout Fund.

In 2017, "Welcome to the Strip" was completely painted over after the building's property was bought by Red Rocks Group in 2014.

==== "It's in the Attic" ====
In 2005, Attic Records in Millvale, Pennsylvania commissioned Sandy Kessler Kaminski to paint a two-sectioned mural depicting the history of recorded music after flooding caused by Hurricane Ivan smashed two of the record shop's windows. The work includes popular artists like Bob Dylan, Elvis Presley, and The Beatles, as well as blues artist Bessie Smith and jazz artist Duke Ellington. The resulting mural, which still stands, was titled "It's in the Attic".

==== "Corner of Hope" ====
In collaboration with the Josh Gibson Foundation and Oakglade Realty, Sandy Kessler Kaminski worked with as well as provided guidance and instruction to students at The Pittsburgh Project to help restore the nine murals. The finished pieces were installed in a park at the corner of Wilson Avenue and West Burgess Street in Pittsburgh, Pennsylvania in the summer of 2017.

==== "Time Travelers" ====
In 2019, Kessler Kaminski and another Pittsburgh artist named Edith Abeyta were commissioned by the City of Pittsburgh to create a mural for Pittsburgh's Elizabeth Street Bridge in the city's neighborhood of Hazelwood. The mural was inspired by the Candy Land board game and depicts the history of Hazelwood and was developed with the help of community input and direct community involvement.

==== "Tonee Turner" ====
On December 30, 2019, a young woman from Pittsburgh's Hazelwood neighborhood named Tonee Turner went missing. In September, 2020, Kessler Kaminski and Marce Nixon-Washington, a multi-disciplinary artist from Pittsburgh, designed a mural in honor of the missing Turner. The work includes Turner's birthday and the quote, "The missing find solace in our hearts until they are found."

== Exhibitions ==
- Art of the State Exhibit at the State Museum of Pennsylvania, Harrisburg, Pennsylvania (2017)
- Bridging the Landscape at BE Galleries, Pittsburgh, Pennsylvania (2015)
- A Variation of Unknown Medical Significance, Pittsburgh Center for the Arts, Pittsburgh, Pennsylvania (2007)
- Quiet Storm, Pittsburgh, Pennsylvania (2003)
- Miami University Young Painters Competition, Oxford, Ohio (2002)
- Pittsburgh Center for the Arts, Pittsburgh, Pennsylvania (2001)
- 65th National Midyear Exhibition, Butler Institute of American Art, Youngstown, Ohio (2001)
- Associated Artists of Butler County, Pennsylvania (2001)
- Helios Arts, Pittsburgh, Pennsylvania (2000)
- Hoyt Institute of Fine Arts, New Castle, Pennsylvania (2000)
- Butler Museum of American Art, Youngstown, Ohio (2000, 2001)
- Studio 615, Cleveland, Ohio
- Art for Life Auction, Columbus Museum of Art, Columbus, Ohio (1998)
- Columbus Art League, Columbus, Ohio (1997)
- Iannotta Gallery, Pittsburgh, Pennsylvania
- Ohio State Fair Professional Division (1994, 1997)
- Border to Border National Drawing Competition, Clarksville, Tennessee (1993, 1997)
- Acme Art Gallery, Columbus, Ohio (1996, 1999)
- 14th Annual Women Artists—A Celebration, Youngstown, Ohio (1995)
- Mile Zero Gallery, Columbus, Ohio (1994)
- Artists Co-Operative, Austin, Texas (1993)

== Collections ==
- Dick Blick Art Supply LLC, Pittsburgh, Pennsylvania
- Smart Technologies, Pittsburgh, Pennsylvania
- Magee Women's Health Center, Pittsburgh, Pennsylvania
- WEBB Law, One Gateway, Pittsburgh, Pennsylvania
- Del Monte, Pittsburgh, Pennsylvania
- Citizens Bank, Pittsburgh, Pennsylvania
- Public Employees Retirement System of the State of Ohio
- Ohio State University's Fisher College of Business, Columbus, Ohio
- Bishop Hartley High School, Columbus, Ohio
- St. Joseph's Cathedral, Diocese of Columbus
- Asbury Automotive, New York, New York
- Larson Drawing Collection at Austin Peay State University, Clarksville, Tennessee
