= Joana Ricou =

Portuguese artist

Joana Ricou is an artist from Portugal but currently resides in Brooklyn, New York. She studied biology and art at Carnegie Mellon University in Pittsburgh, Pennsylvania, where she received a Bachelor of Arts and Science in 2004. She also received a Master of Science from Duquesne University, also in Pittsburgh, in 2009.

== Work ==
Joana Ricou's work currently explores two different themes, one about finding beauty and deeper truths in quiet, private moments, and one about exploring the intersection of biology and art. In the BioArt exhibition “Nonhuman Subjectives,” Ricou contributed to the microbiome theme with some of her creations from the “Other Selves” series she created. This series involved Joana taking samples from various parts of her body and the environment and let them grow in a petri dish. This exhibit included a series of “Bellybutton Portraits” that consisted of intriguing photographs of the bacteria that exists in our bellybuttons. The idea of this exhibit was to inspire viewers to think about the nonhuman parts of their bodies, such as the bacteria living in their bellybuttons. This series was also featured in a solo show at the North Carolina Museum of Natural Science.

Accompanied by Pooneh Heshmati, Ricou co-lead an art and science project that explored the impact smell and co-sleeping has on our happiness.

== Awards ==
Ricou received the Micro Spark award from the Sprout Fund in 2012, and was also a finalist in the National Science Foundation Visualization Challenge in 2011. She received second place in the Annual Juried Show in the ModernFormations Gallery in 2006.

Additionally, she received tuition remission for her fifth year of study during the 2004-2005 academic year, and a small undergraduate research award in 2005. She is also a member of the Phi Kappa Phi Honor Society.

In 2012, Joana Ricou painted a piece that explores how memory is formed and recalled. This work was published by Stanford Medicine as their “image of the week.” Ricou has been quoted on the painting saying, “I’m interested in the idea that we each are many – and that from moment to moment, we shift, split, merge, cooperate, compete or ignore ourselves. My home, studio and phone are covered in notes and reminders, an endless exercise in attempting to connect each moment to the next, or to the one that comes after that. The series is inspired by recent research on memory that mirrors my daily experience. I find that the processes of painting and transferring parallel the processes of memory making and recall. Painting and transfers are like lossy filters that selectively and randomly keep information and also selectively and randomly lose information. They also modify and destroy their source as they build upon it, just as we massage our memories or past selves to fit our mood and circumstance, stringing them together in a narrative and filling them with meaning.”
