= Adam Frelin =

American sculptor

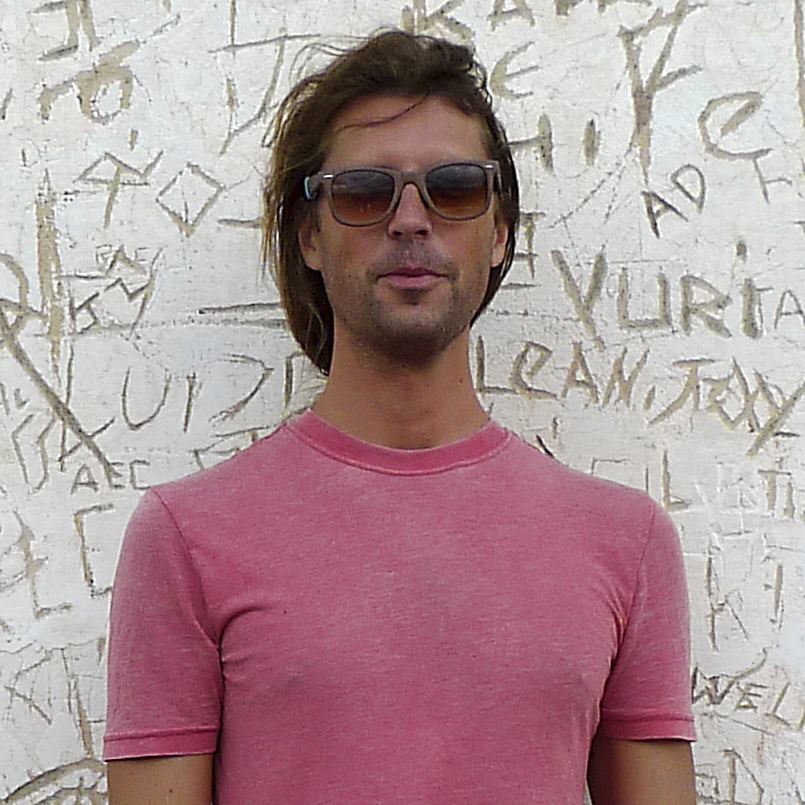
- Adam Frelin portrait
- Born: 1973 (age 52–53)
- Awards: National Endowment for the Arts New York Foundation for the Arts Gateway Foundation

Adam Frelin (born 1973) is an American artist working in sculpture., video, photography, and performance. He received a BFA from Indiana University of Pennsylvania, and an MFA University of California, San Diego. He has shown at venues such as the Getty Center, Aldrich Contemporary Art Museum, I-Park Foundation, the Columbus Museum, Samson Projects Evergreen House and Contemporary Art Museum St. Louis.

Frelin's work is known for its usage of place and impermanence, informed by extensive travel, though he does not consider himself an environmental artist. "Since I don’t have a big white room to show work in, I make it outside," he told St. Louis Post-Dispatch art critic David Bonetti in 2006. "When I began travelling, I found that it was advantageous to not interrupt what I saw by putting it through my own filtering system. I’ve learned to isolate and concentrate attention of perceived phenomenon. The more you train your eye in that direction, the better you get at it".

In 2000, while completing his second and final year of graduate school, Frelin received a National Endowment for the Arts College Art Association Fellowship. A year later, he became a visiting artist and then a faculty member at Webster University in St. Louis, MO. In 2004 he received an award from the Gateway Foundation for his installations White Heat and Things Airborne. He has also received awards from the New York Foundation for the Arts. Of Frelin's 2006 work, The Mirroring Stone, a gravestone made of polished steel, Boston Globe Correspondent Cait McQuaid said: "Walking past, the reflection of grass and other monuments reads like a dizzying warp in your vision. Stop and focus, and you'll discover your own reflection, a chilling reminder that in the end, all that will be left of you is a marker on your grave".

In 2007, Frelin participated in two international commissions. The United States Embassy, Japan, commissioned Frelin for an art installation in Tokyo, Japan. The project, White Line (Tokyo), consisted of lighting instruments suspended along an arching steel cable, was installed in the garden of the International House of Japan. The Center for Contemporary Art, Kyiv, commissioned Frelin and two others to travel to Ukraine and produce works based on the experience, which were later exhibited in Los Angeles.

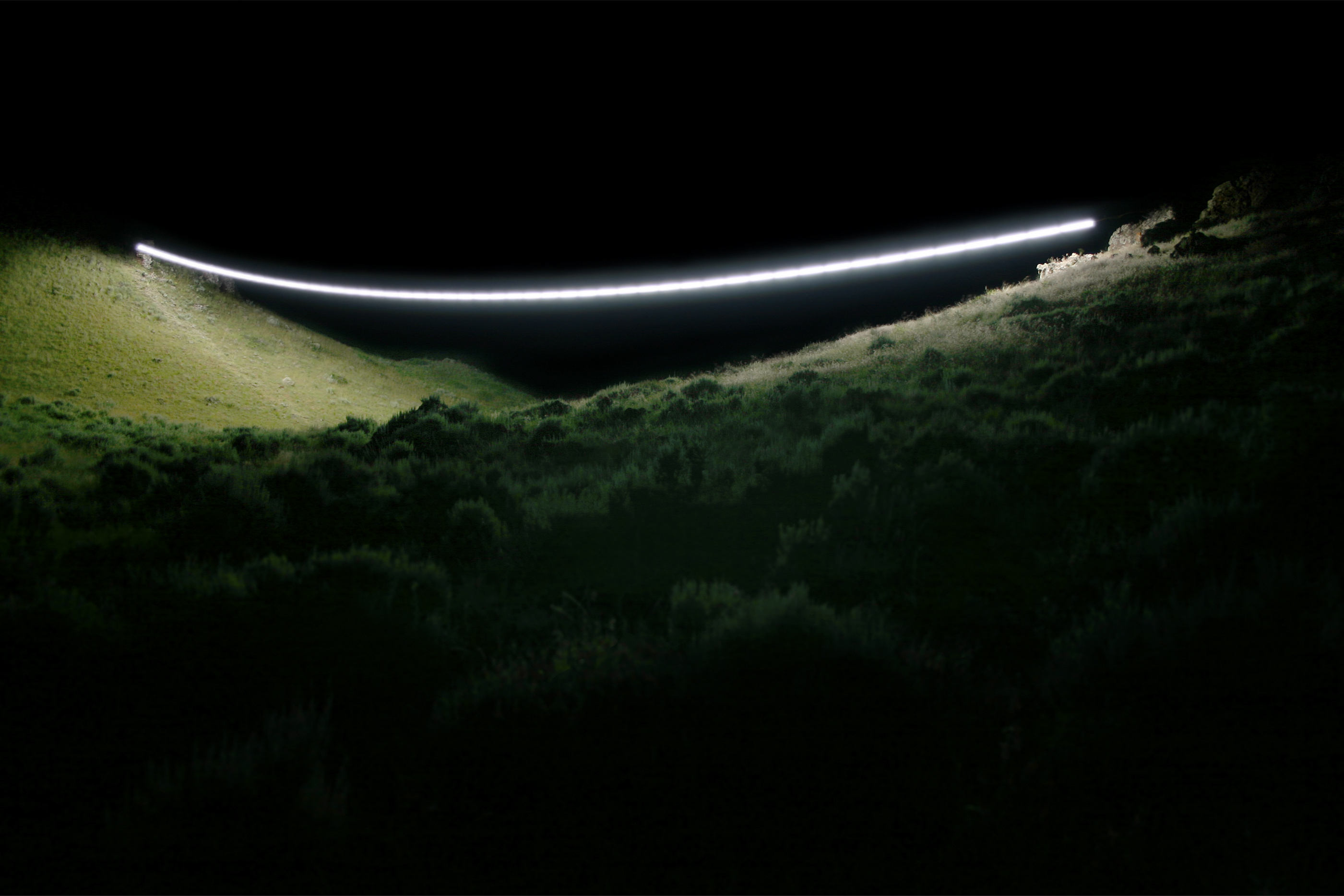
White Line (Wyoming), 2005

In 2008, the Milwaukee Art Museum Exhibited a series of Frelin's video work as part of the Media Projects 2008 exhibit. "With an over-the-river-and-through-the-woods storybook feel," said the Milwaukee Journal Sentinel's Mary Louise Schumacher, "Frelin's works are filled with pilgrimages and a sense of place"

Frelin has completed residencies at the Skowhegan School of Painting and Sculpture, MacDowell Colony, Ucross Foundation, Fine Arts Work Center, Bemis Center for Contemporary Arts among others. He is currently an associate professor in the Department of Art and Art History at SUNY University at Albany, and lives in Troy, NY.

He participated in 2013's Art in Odd Places festival with a performance piece, KODAMAZOTHGOLEMNKISI

In 2014, Frelin's Crier appeared as part of The Last Billboard installation by Pittsburgh artist Jon Rubin. The text of his billboard installation reads "Let's put loudspeakers on the roofs of hospitals/Let's announce births and deaths as they occur". In December, his work was exhibited at the Radiator Gallery in Long Island City, alongside artist Rena Leinberger in a show titled From Within the Flesh of the World.

In February 2015, Frelin and co-artist Barbara Nelson were selected by Bloomberg Philanthropies as one of 12 finalists for the Bloomberg Public Art Challenge. Their project, on behalf of three upstate New York cities, proposes to illuminate the windows of vacant buildings in New York's Capital Region. In June 2015, Bloomberg Philanthropies announced that their proposal was selected for funding, with an award amount of up to $1 million.

== Education ==
He received a BFA from Indiana University of Pennsylvania, and an MFA from the University of California, San Diego.

== Work ==
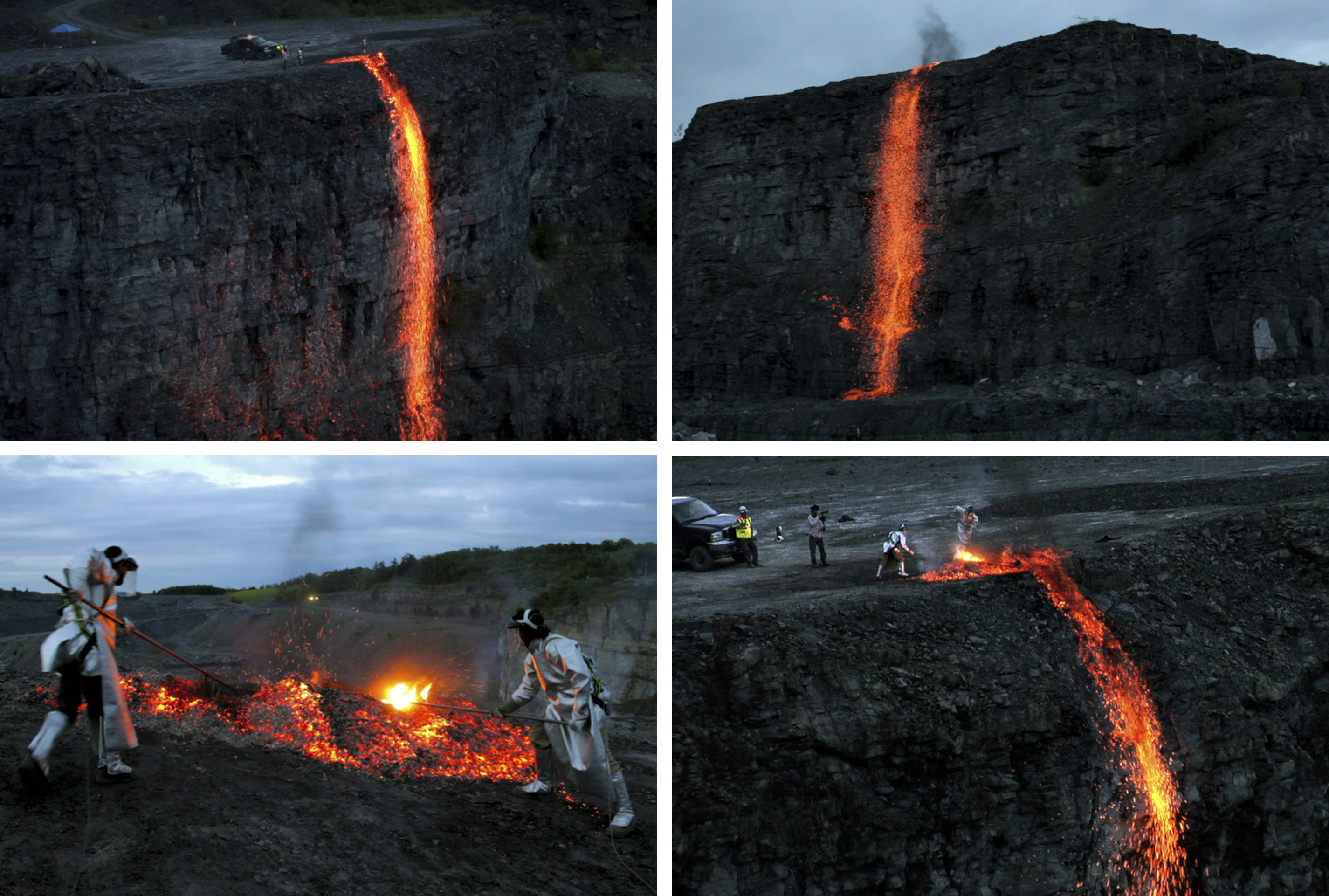
Firefall, 2012

As part of an essay written for Frelin's book of photography, Trees Hit By Cars, Toby Kamps, Curator of Modern and Contemporary Art at the Menil Collection in Houston describes his work this way: “While he covers large physical and aesthetic territories, Frelin is aware that he works in a time of limited resources––natural and artistic. His is an art for the age of global warming. Even as he goes to great lengths to create and catalogue revelatory intercessions in the environment, Frelin realizes the hubris and the ultimate impossibility of bending the world to his will and his will to the world. As a countermeasure, he makes self-criticism a central part of his process. Frelin’s aesthetic and philosophical road––twisting and turning between human and natural, between theory and practice––is treacherous, but he also shows us that the marks left in the struggle for control can serve as portentous blazes on the trail.”
