= Eisenhower Auditorium =

Penn State University performing arts venue

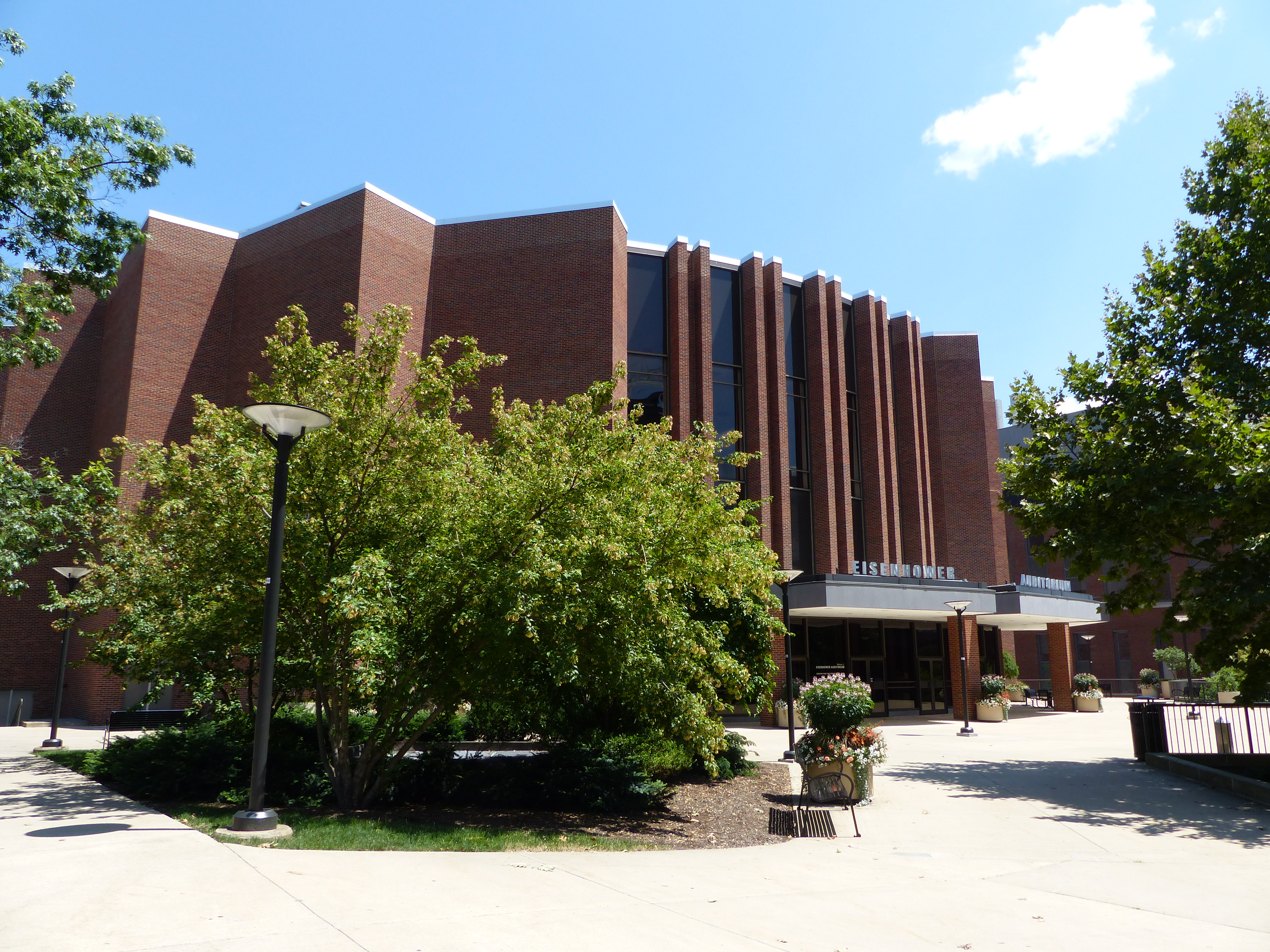
- Eisenhower Auditorium on Penn State's University Park campus
- Interactive map of Eisenhower Auditorium
- Former names: University Auditorium (1974—1977)
- Location: University Park, Pennsylvania
- Coordinates: 40.80153°N 77.86172°W
- Owner: Pennsylvania State University
- Capacity: 2,500
- Type: Auditorium
- Events: Music, concerts, lectures, commencements, and theatre

Construction
- Groundbreaking: Summer 1971
- Built: October 1973
- Opened: May 8, 1974

Eisenhower Auditorium (originally named "University Auditorium") is Pennsylvania State University's largest performing arts venue. Located centrally on the University Park campus, Eisenhower Auditorium hosts more than 200 plays, musicals, concerts, lectures, and commencements annually.

== Construction ==
Construction of Eisenhower Auditorium began in the summer of 1971 and was completed in October 1973. Installation of technical equipment ended in January 1974 and the building was dedicated under its original name "University Auditorium" on May 8, 1974.

== Seating ==
Seating at Eisenhower Auditorium is divided into three levels- the orchestra, the grand tier, and the balcony. There are no middle aisles in the auditorium.

== Extended Sunset ==
In October 2019, artist and associate professor of art at the University of Albany Adam Frelin installed his work, Extended Sunset in the six vertical windows of the facade of Eisenhower Auditorium. The work features a colorful Pennsylvania sunset, backlit by LED lamp on an astronomical timer system. The work first illuminates as the actual sunset begins and then fades as the sun rises in the morning.
