= Sherrie Flick =

American fiction writer (born 1967)

Sherrie Flick (born 1967) is an American fiction writer whose work has appeared in Prairie Schooner, North American Review, Quarterly West, Puerto del Sol, Weave Magazine, Quick Fiction, Lit Hub, and other literary magazines. Flick is also a regular contributor to the Pittsburgh Post-Gazette, which publishes her column "In a Writer's Urban Garden." In 2021, her work was performed by actress Marin Ireland for Symphony Space.

She has received artist residencies from the Ucross Foundation, Atlantic Center for the Arts, and Virginia Center for the Creative Arts, and a Tennessee Williams Fellowship from the Sewanee Writers' Conference. She received a 2007 individual artist fellowship from the Pennsylvania Council on the Arts.

For ten years Flick was artistic director and co-founder of the Gist Street Reading Series in Pittsburgh, Pennsylvania. She is a senior lecturer in the Food Studies program and the MFA creative writing program at the Chatham University, serves as senior editor at SmokeLong Quarterly, is a former series editor of The Best Small Fictions series, and is the co-editor for W. W. Norton's Flash Fiction America. She has taught interdisciplinary writing workshops in arts institutions, including the Carnegie Museum of Art and Silver Eye Center for Photography, and curates literary programs in alternative settings like Wood-Fired Words in Braddock, Pennsylvania, and for the Pittsburgh Office for Public Art.

== Awards ==
- 2009 VCU First Novelist Award Semi-finalist for Reconsidering Happiness
- 2016 CCM Entropy Best Fiction Book of 2016 for Whiskey, Etc.
- 2017 INDIES Foreword Bronze Prize for the Short Story for Whiskey, Etc.

== Works ==
Books:

- I Call This Flirting, short stories (Chico: Flume Press, 2004).
- Reconsidering Happiness, novel (Lincoln: University of Nebraska Press, 2009).
- Whiskey, Etc., short stories (Plano: Queen's Ferry Press, 2016).
- Thank Your Lucky Stars, short stories (Pittsburgh: Autumn House Press, 2018).
- Flash Fiction America: 73 very short stories, Co-Editor (W.W. Norton, 2023)
- Homing: Instincts of a Rustbelt Feminist, essay collection (Lincoln: University of Nebraska Press, 2024)
- I Have Not Considered Consequences, short stories (Pittsburgh: Autumn House Press, 2025).

Nonfiction:

- "Caretaker, Murderer, Undertaker: A Plan B Essay," essay in Ploughshares 125 (Winter 2014–2015)
- "Talk Right" in Western Pennsylvania History Magazine (Summer 2021)

== Sources ==
- Contemporary Authors Online. The Gale Group, 2008.
