= Hunt Armory =

- U.S. National Register of Historic Places
- Pittsburgh Historic Designation
- Pittsburgh Landmark – PHLF
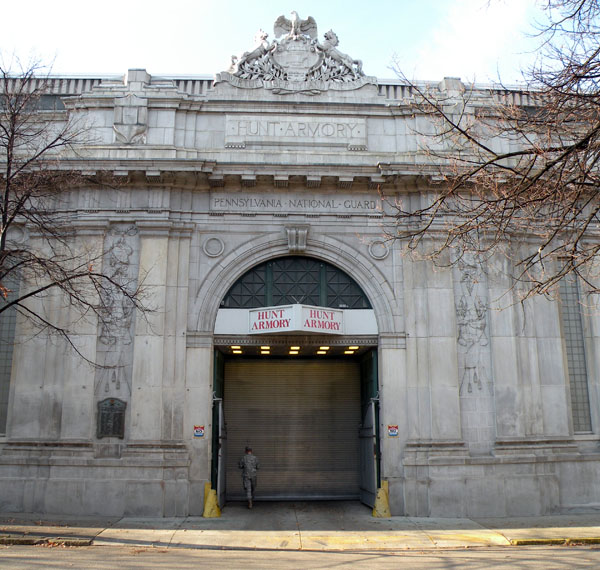
- Hunt Armory

- Location within Pittsburgh Location within Pennsylvania Location within the United States
- Location: 324 Emerson Street, Shadyside, Pittsburgh, Pennsylvania
- Nearest city: Pittsburgh, Pennsylvania
- Coordinates: 40°27′22.11″N 79°55′26.16″W
- Built: 1916
- Built by: Dawson Construction Co.
- Architect: W.G. Wilkins Co.
- Architectural style: Classical Revival
- NRHP reference No.: 91001697

Significant dates
- Added to NRHP: November 14, 1991
- Designated CPHS: February 27, 2014
- Designated PHLF: 2014

Hunt Armory (also known as Pittsburgh Armory) is a former armory located at 324 Emerson Street in the Shadyside neighborhood of Pittsburgh, Pennsylvania. It was designed by Pittsburgh architects W.G. Wilkins Co. Announced on August 29, 1909 and budgeted at $450,000 ($16.1 million in present-day terms) it was completed by 1916. The armory was named after Spanish–American War hero, metallurgist, and industrialist Captain Alfred E. Hunt (1855–1899), best known for founding the company that would eventually become Alcoa, the world's largest producer and distributor of aluminum. The Hunt Armory occupies an entire city block covering an area of 56,000 square feet (5,200 m^{2}), also reported as 1.84 acres.

For many years, it was used (along with the Syria Mosque) as the city's main auditorium. Until the Pittsburgh Civic Arena was completed in 1961, the Hunt Armory was the largest auditorium in Pittsburgh and was frequently the host for concerts and political events including:

- October 20, 1944: Presidential candidate Thomas E. Dewey.
- October 23, 1948: President Harry S. Truman with a crowd of over 25,000.
- September 7 - October 4, 1952: Billy Graham's Pittsburgh crusade.
- October 27, 1952: Presidential candidate Dwight D. Eisenhower.
- October 30, 1952: Presidential candidate Adlai Stevenson.
- October 9, 1956: President Eisenhower.
- October 31, 1956: Presidential candidate Adlai Stevenson speaks to 12,000.

The Armory is closed for military use, but continues to be used for other purposes. In 2008, it hosted the Handmade Arcade.

By 2015, historically appropriate redevelopment was being planned under the City's Urban Redevelopment Authority (URA). In November 2021, the site opened as a public skating rink, becoming the first indoor community ice rink opened within the city of Pittsburgh in 25 years. The rink serves as the home of Chatham University's ice hockey teams.

Hunt Armory has been listed in the National Register of Historic Places since November 14, 1991. It received City of Pittsburgh historic landmark status on February 27, 2014.

== See also ==
- National Register of Historic Places listings in Allegheny County, Pennsylvania
