= Center for Emerging Visual Artists =

American non-profit organization

The Center for Emerging Visual Artists was founded in 1984 as Creative Artists Network (CAN) in Philadelphia, Pennsylvania, by Felicity R. "Bebe" Benoliel in an apartment at the Barclay Hotel on Rittenhouse Square. The non-profit organization serves emerging artists who live and work within 100 miles of Philadelphia, an area that includes the cities of Baltimore, MD and New York, NY, and the entire states of Delaware and New Jersey. The Center for Emerging Visual Artists provides a two-year career development program to artists accepted by the organization's board of artistic advisors.

Alumni of the program include the painters Jane Golden and Vincent Desiderio, multidisciplinary artist Arlene Rush, and photographer Judy Gelles.

Following the death of founder and executive director Benoliel in 2000, the organization began a process of reorganization under Antonia W. Hamilton. In 2001 Maida R. Milone, Esq. was appointed president and chief executive officer. The organization began using the name "The Center for Emerging Visual Artists" in 2004.

In recent years, the organization has increased its emphasis on programs that serve the entire community, including artists, art collectors, and the general public.
