= Joseph del Pesco =

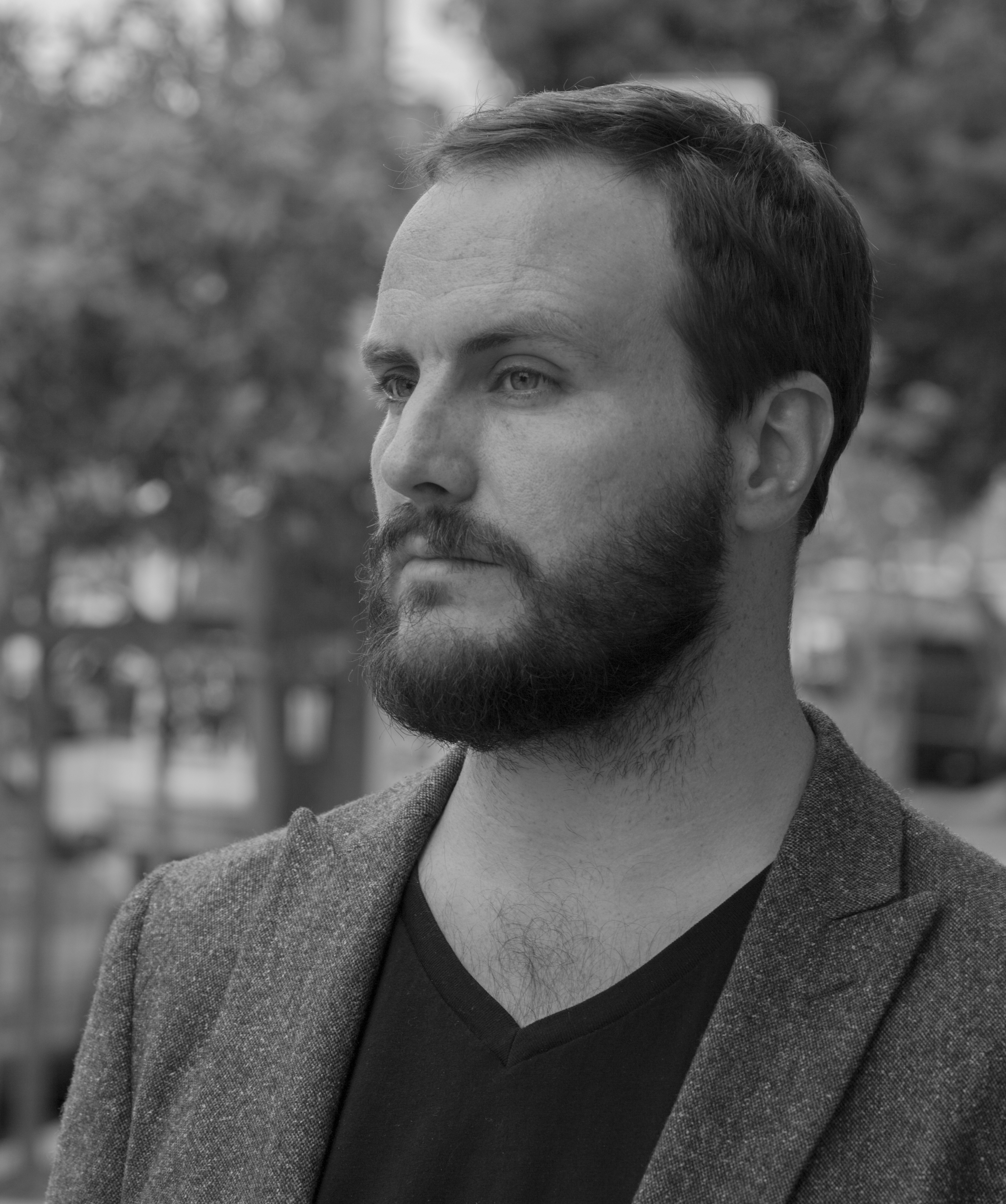
- Born: Joseph Thomas del Pesco; December 29, 1975 (age 50); Wilmington, Delaware
- Education: California College of the Arts
- Known for: curator
- Awards: Jerome Foundation Fellowship, Banff Curatorial Residency, Fondazione Sandretto Re Rebuadengo residency, Fogo Island Arts Residency, ArtPort Tel Aviv residency, Beta-Local residency

Joseph Thomas Del Pesco is a contemporary art curator and arts writer. He is currently the International Director of Kadist.

== Biography ==
He holds a 2005 Masters of Arts degree in Curatorial Practice from the California College of the Arts. In 2002, del Pesco was chosen to participate in the Renaissance Society's group show, Watery, Domestic.

=== Publications ===
Del Pesco has had his writing published in Manifesta Journal. In 2018, his book of short stories The Museum Took a Few Minutes to Collect Itself was published by Art Metropole (Toronto, Canada). In 2024, del Pesco wrote a short story with artist Jon Rubin for the Substack newsletter Do Not Research titled DAO of the Dead.
