= Mural Arts Philadelphia =

Nonprofit organization in Philadelphia, United States

Coordinates: 39.96531°N 75.16695°W

Mural Arts Philadelphia is a non-profit organization that supports the creation of public murals in Philadelphia, Pennsylvania. Founded in 1986 as the Mural Arts Program, the organization was renamed in 2016. Having ushered more than 4,000 murals into being, it calls itself "the nation’s largest public art program." As of 2024, the organization runs 50 to 100 public art projects each year, including new murals in neighborhoods such as Kensington, Northern Liberties, Philadelphia, and the Gayborhood. It also works to maintain existing murals. Of these art pieces painted on buildings, 2,000 are still viewable by the public, making this collection the "World’s Largest Outdoor Art Gallery."

The program was founded under the direction of local artist Jane Golden as part of the Philadelphia Anti-Graffiti Network to facilitate collaboration between professional artists and prosecuted graffiti writers to create new murals in the city. The program, which employs more than 300 artists at least part-time, is one of the largest employers of artists in Philadelphia. The program also hires more than 100 prosecuted graffiti writers every year and involves them in the creation of murals around Philadelphia. In 2006, the program had 36 former graffiti artists on permanent payroll.

It works with community groups to educate and children in the arts and involve them in the creation of the murals; in 2006, it involved more than 300 children a year.

The Mural Arts Program is responsible for the creation of the largest mural in Philadelphia: History of Immigration, a 600-foot (180 m) work that portrays people of different ethnicities who settled in Philadelphia over time. In 2022, the building was demolished and the mural subsequently moved off-site.

== History ==
In 1984, artist Jane Golden approached Tim Spencer, who was head of the Philadelphia Anti-Graffiti Network (PAGN), about adding a program named "Umbrella". Several graffiti taggers were given the option to either go to jail or take part in a new city beautification initiative, and Spencer had initially envisioned a program that would rehabilitate graffiti artists and lead them towards other art forms. In the end, Golden's proposal won. In 1986, Mural Arts Project, led by Golden, was founded as a division of PAGN.

In 1991, the Ash Center for Democratic Governance and Innovation awarded the Innovation in American Government Award to Philadelphia for the success of the Mural Arts Project.

At some point, the Philadelphia Recreation Department absorbed PAGN and elevated the Mural Arts Program to a separate entity. The Philadelphia Mural Arts Advocates was founded as a nonprofit corporation to raise funds for the Mural Arts Program.

In 1995, the Mural Arts Program commissioned Philadelphia artist Diane Keller to paint a multistory mural of former Philadelphia Mayor Frank Rizzo at Ninth and Montrose Streets, near the city's Italian Market. Though some in the city's Italian-American community took pride in the depiction of Rizzo, the mural was frequently defaced in protest of his rough treatment of the city’s Black and gay communities. In 2010, the MAP had Keller repaint the mural at a cost of $20,000. After the mural was again defaced during the George Floyd protests, the Mural Arts Program issued a statement ("We know that the removal of this mural does not erase painful memories and are deeply apologetic for the amount of grief it has caused”) and painted over it in the early hours of June 7, 2020.

Since 2001 the Mural Arts Program has been headquartered in the former home and studio of the painter Thomas Eakins at 1727-29 Mount Vernon Street in the Spring Garden section of Philadelphia.

During the 2001–2004 Neighborhood Transformation Initiative, the Mural Arts Program painted more than 600 murals around Philadelphia.

In 2004, the murals painted by the program were on average the height of a three-story row house and 35 feet (11 m) wide. The average cost of each mural was $10,000–$15,000, including artists' commissions and supplies.

In February 2006, the city of Watertown, New York, asked Jane Golden to speak in hopes of creating a similar program in their community. In 2007, Prince Charles and his wife Camilla visited the Donald Gensler mural Reading: A Journey, at 40th and Penns Grove Streets. The visit was intended to demonstrate how the murals have inspired regeneration in the West Philadelphia neighborhood. Prince Charles was interested in creating a similar project in London.

In 2014 the Mural Arts Program celebrated its 30th anniversary with the book "Philadelphia Mural Arts @30" and an exhibition at the Pennsylvania Academy of the Fine Arts.

In 2016, the organization was renamed Mural Arts Philadelphia.

In 2017, the program worked with Monument Lab to produce several works of public art in Philadelphia.

In 2024, Mural Arts celebrated its 40th anniversary, when including the foundational days of PAGN, exploring the theme "Roots & Reimagination."

== Murals ==
- 1995: Before the founding of Mural Arts Philadelphia, Jane Golden painted the mural "Waterfalls" at 1014-18 S. 48th street in West Philadelphia. The mural remains on view as part of the Mural Arts Collection.
- 1998: Mural artist Meg Saligman created Common Threads at Broad and Spring Garden streets. The work comments on the shared history of humanity through the juxtaposition of classical sculptural forms with those of local high school students.
- 1999: Artist Josh Sarantitis created Colors of Light at 12th and Vine Streets, facing the Vine Street Expressway. Commissioned in partnership with the Asian Arts Initiative, the mural represents the local Asian American community, including Asian Arts Initiative founder Gayle Isa and a poem by Jeffrey Loo. In 2017, the mural was completely covered by the construction of XS House, a 7-unit apartment building built on the adjoining 11' x 93' lot to the north.
- 2016: The Atlas of Tomorrow: A Device for Philosophical Reflection (533 South Juniper Street, Philadelphia) is a piece by Candy Chang, an artist whose pieces often have a participatory element to them. In this kinetic mural, viewers are invited to spin a numeric dial. Where the dial lands directs the viewer to read and reflect on one of 64 unique stories.
- 2018: Artist Joshua Mays and DJ King Britt worked with Mural Arts Philadelphia to create Dreams, Diaspora and Destiny, an "augmented reality" mural that included music and a mobile app. The piece is at 5300 Landsdowne Ave.
- June 2019: Baltimore artists Jessie Unterhalter and Katey Truhn along with curator Ryan Strand Greenberg created Folding the Prism, a mural that highlights the textile history of the Spring Garden neighborhood of Philadelphia. The piece is located at 12th and Spring Gardens Streets.
- November 2020: artists Paul Santoleri and Abdul Karim Awad created "Light of the Northeast", a mural that features the Statue of Liberty. The mural is located at 6826 Bustleton Avenue in Philadelphia.
- 2021: Elastic Geography by Arden Bendler Browning was created in partnership with Yards Brewing and Alliance HSP. The artist developed work using the palette of Yards’ current product labels and incorporated selected landmarks around the neighborhood. The resulting murals are a series of round portals offering abstract and gestural imaginary landscapes.

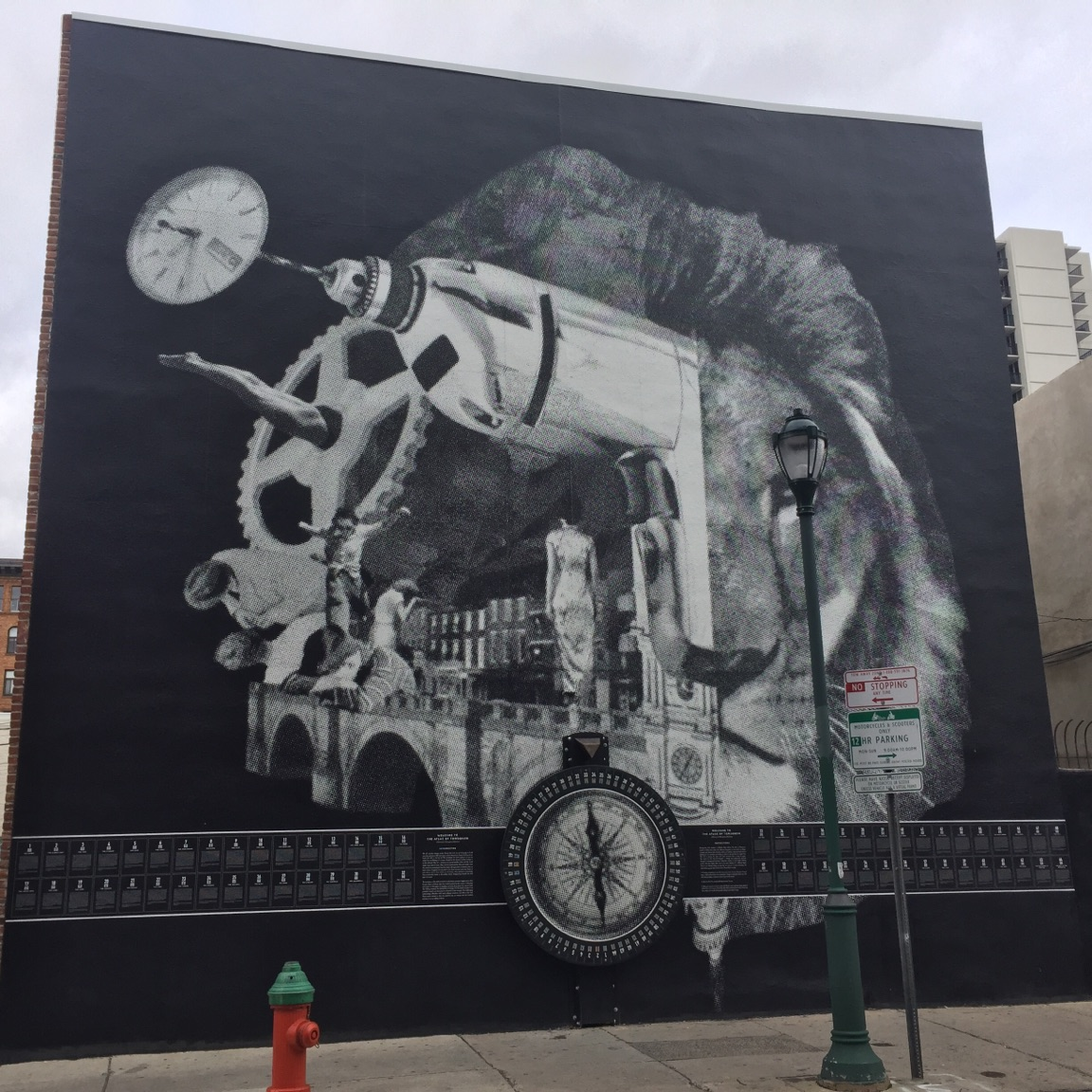
Atlas of Tomorrow is a mural by artist Candy Chang, which has a kinetic component in which the viewer can spin the wheel.

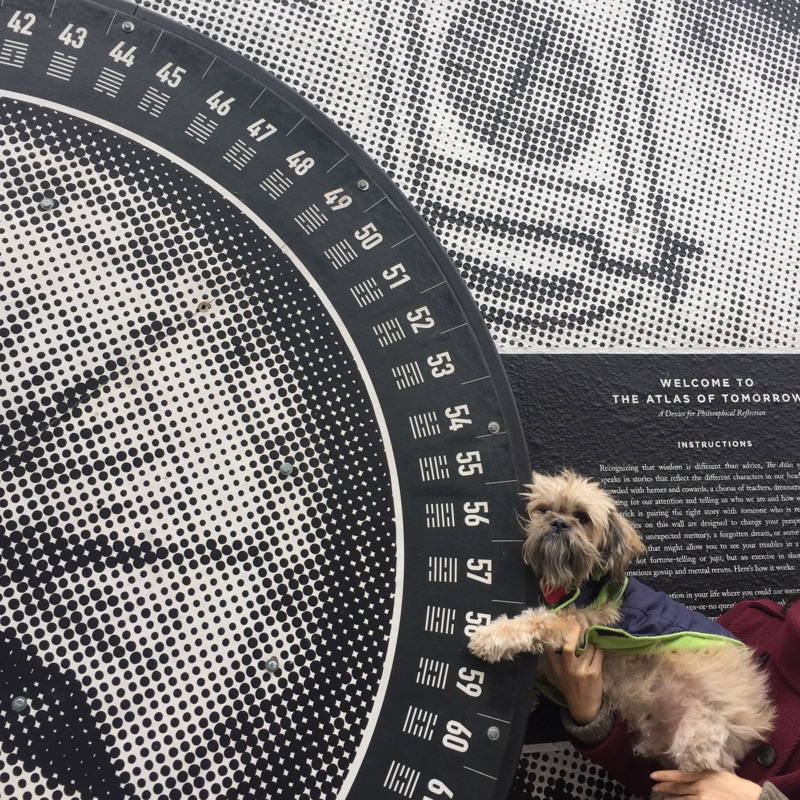
The mural, commissioned by the Mural Arts Program, includes a kinetic wheel at sidewalk level, which directs the viewer to a unique story based on where it lands.

== See also ==
- The Sprout Fund — Pittsburgh mural program
- City of Philadelphia Mural Arts Program at Google Cultural Institute
