= Arlene Rush =

Artist

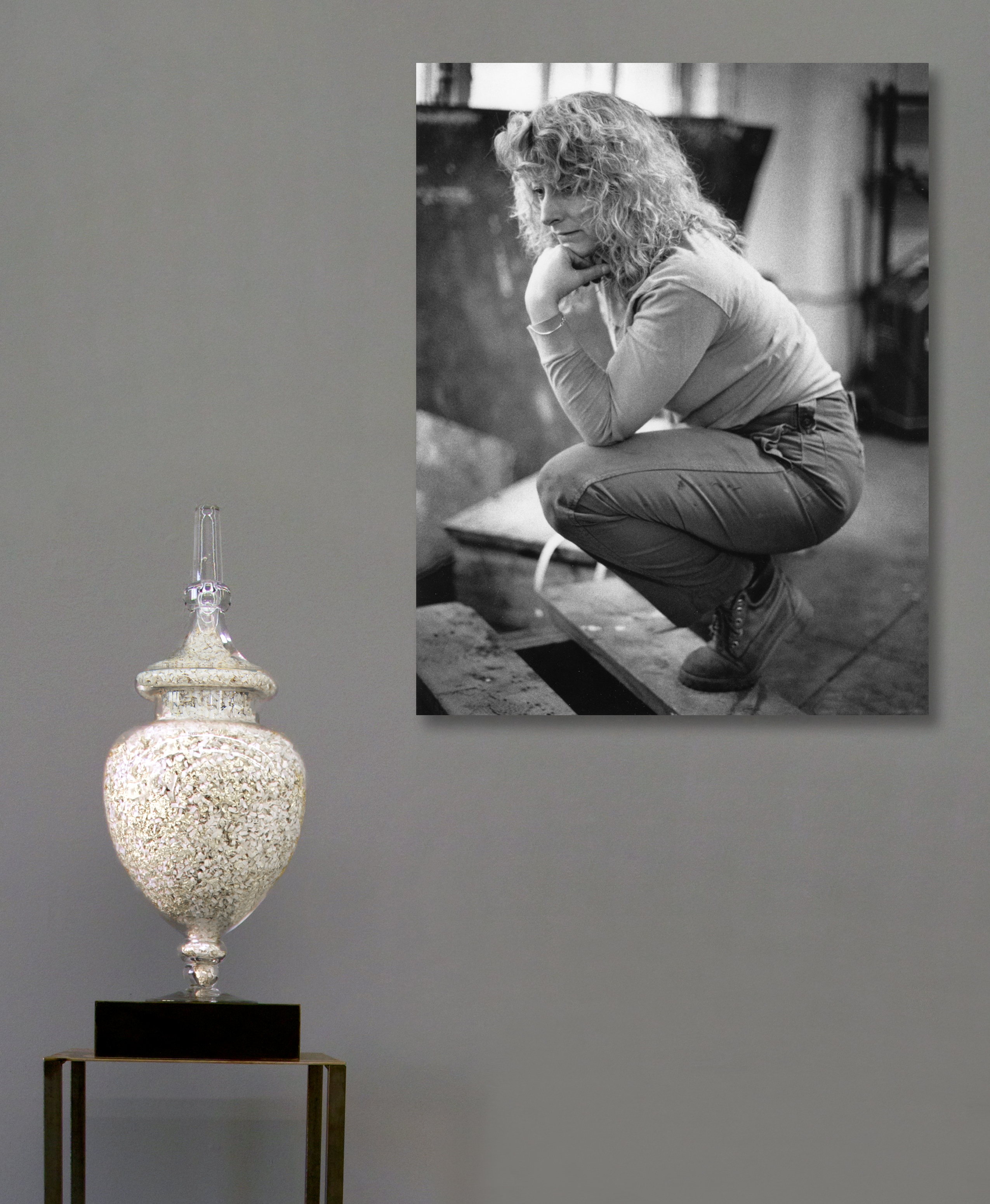
- Arlene Rush, The Thinker (Detail), 1988-2018, Digital c-print, glass vase, shredded rejection letters, metal and wood 82”h x 42”w x 14”d
- Born: The Bronx, New York
- Education: Queens College, City University of New York
- Alma mater: Queens College
- Known for: Sculpture, installation, mixed-media
- Notable work: Fragment Parts and Pieces: heads, vaginal, hands/arms, Twins, Evidence of Being, My Body as a Battleground, Where Liberty Dwells, Current Affairs
- Movement: Conceptual art
- Website: www.arlenerush.com

Arlene Rush is a New York City-based interdisciplinary artist. Her work addresses themes and issues that impact the contemporary world, including gender roles, societal norms, socioeconomics, and politics.

== Early life and education ==
Rush was born in Manhattan in 1955, and grew up in the Parkchester section of The Bronx. She had a twin brother. As a child, Rush's creativity, which included playing with Erector sets and Play-Doh and carving soap, was encouraged by her parents. She began studying sculpture in High School, and continued her artistic education at Queens College where she received a Bachelor of Arts in 1978, with a strong focus in sculpture.

== Career ==
Rush's artistic career began in the Chelsea district of Manhattan, where she obtained her first studio in 1986. She was the earliest artist to setup a long term studio at the notable West Chelsea Arts building located at 526 West 26th Street, which she has occupied for over 30 years.

Rush has previously worked in the architectural and design furnishing industry doing sales, design, project management, and architectural restoration. She has taught art to women with cancer through The Creative Center, a New York based nonprofit organization that brings creative arts to people with cancer and chronic illnesses. As of 2022 Rush sits on The Creative Center's Advisory Council.

== Artwork ==
In the beginning of her career, Rush created abstract metal sculptures in a modernist style following architectural concepts. In 1991, Rush’s art-making was stirred by Buddhism, which led to an incorporation of philosophical ideas in her artwork. In addition to making art inspired by Buddhist philosophy, she follows the modern New Kadampa Buddhist tradition.

Starting from the mid to late 1990s, Rush's art began to focus on an interdisciplinary conceptual art practice that uses corporeal forms and iconography to explore the human condition, and society's views on gender roles and identity. The act of meditation prompted Rush's methodology of creating multiples of an image or concept. Her ongoing cast heads are an example of the use of repetition. She explains that, "I started using the form of genderless heads to talk about philosophical ideas: the stripping away of the self that we normally see does not exist, and creates in us a feeling of being separate and isolated. Uniting the gender to an androgynous head created a feeling of unity and connectedness."

Rush's Twins series (2000-2018) is a notable ongoing body of interdisciplinary artwork examining gender and identity through multiple layers of identity and sameness. Critic Steve Rockwell writes about one of the works, Twins III (2000), noting that, "The articulation of sexual distinction is achieved through the tailoring of clothing to shape anatomy. Hand-holding siblings raise their free hands in a kind of benediction to a possible new birth, the bannister before them suggestive of a crib. The fingers of the hand of the sister overlays the image of the mother bride on the wall behind them as a confirming gesture of attribution. The expressed moment is at once, intimate, lovely, and touching."

Rush's My Body As a Battleground is a series documenting her experience with breast cancer in 2011.

As Rush began archiving her career, she started making work addressing the effects of the art market, gentrification, class warfare, gender bias, and other kinds of discrimination. This is portrayed in her series Evidence of Being (2016–present), which questions what constitutes success and what she describes as the importance and nature of being an artist working in the face of bias. A participatory element of Evidence of Being took place at a phone booth on 14th Street and 7th Avenue during Art in Odd Places' 2019 festival: INVISIBLE. For the public art event, Rush created an installation using rejection letters from her career and from an open call on social media inviting people to bring their own rejection letters.

Her social and politically themed work includes the mixed-media series Where Liberty Dwells (2019), which features gilded objects displayed upon tasseled pillows and ornate plinths. Each artwork's title is in the form of a social media hashtag that signifies a particular social, cultural, economic, or political issue. Objects include a replica of a gun (#GunControl), a scale model of the White House, a miniature globe (#GlobalWarming), and a Russian doll (#PutinMyLover).

Throughout the COVID-19 pandemic she created masks (resembling the PPE worn to mitigate the virus) with imagery honoring Harriet Tubman, Ruth Bader Ginsburg, and the Black Lives Matter movement. In 2021, Rush started to develop NFTs that reflect her longstanding themes of social justice and identity.

== Exhibitions ==
Rush has exhibited her work in galleries and museums throughout the United States, Europe, and Asia.

She has participated in Visual AIDS’ "Postcards from the Edge" exhibition annually since its inception in 1998.

In 2020, Rush's work was exhibited in Silvermine Art Center's 70th A•ONE, curated by Barbara O'Brien.

Rush's first minted NFT, I’m Still Here, was exhibited at the Every Woman Biennial on June 24, 2021.

Rush and media artist Caroline Voagen Nelson, where presented in a two-person exhibition at the SPRING/BREAK art show in 2023. Featured in the exhibition titled After the Goldrush was an installation of Rush’s series Where Liberty Dwells.

In 2024, Rush was part of the group exhibition Political Circus at Florida Atlantic University’s Schmidt Center Gallery. Her politically charged work included pieces from her Where Liberty Dwells and In Excess series. That same year, she had work from her Twins series exhibited in At Face Value, curated by Robert Curcio and Leah Oates at Station Independent Projects in Toronto, Canada.

== Awards and residencies ==
The Center for Emerging Visual Artists granted Rush a residency in Barcelona, Spain in 1988. In 2011, she was awarded the Pat Hearn & Colin De Land Foundation Grant. For her work that was exhibited at Silvermine Art Center's 70th A•ONE (2020), Rush was awarded the Carole Eisner Award For Sculpture. Rush was the recipient of the Rauschenberg Medical Grant in 2025.

== Collections ==
Rush is in numerous public collections including the 9/11 Memorial & Museum Artist Registry (New York, NY); Schomburg Center for Research in Black Culture (New York, NY); Museum of Modern Art (Wales, UK); Museu Brasileiro de Escultura, Sao Paulo, Brazil; The Center for Emerging Visual Artists (Philadelphia, PA); Library of Congress, Thomas Jefferson Bldg., Washington, D.C.

Rush's art is also in notable private collections including collectors Sara M. Vance Waddell (Cincinnati, OH) and Joe Baio (New York, NY)
