= Graffiti abatement =

Joint effort between groups to eliminate graffiti

Graffiti abatement is a joint effort between a given community; its public works division; police department; community development; and parks, recreation, and community services to eliminate graffiti. In an effective graffiti abatement program, hot spots – areas frequently targeted by graffiti artists – are checked regularly, with the overall goal of removing graffiti as soon as possible. The reasoning given is, that graffiti is an expensive burden for a community, as it lowers property values, generates repair costs and can incite additional criminal activity.

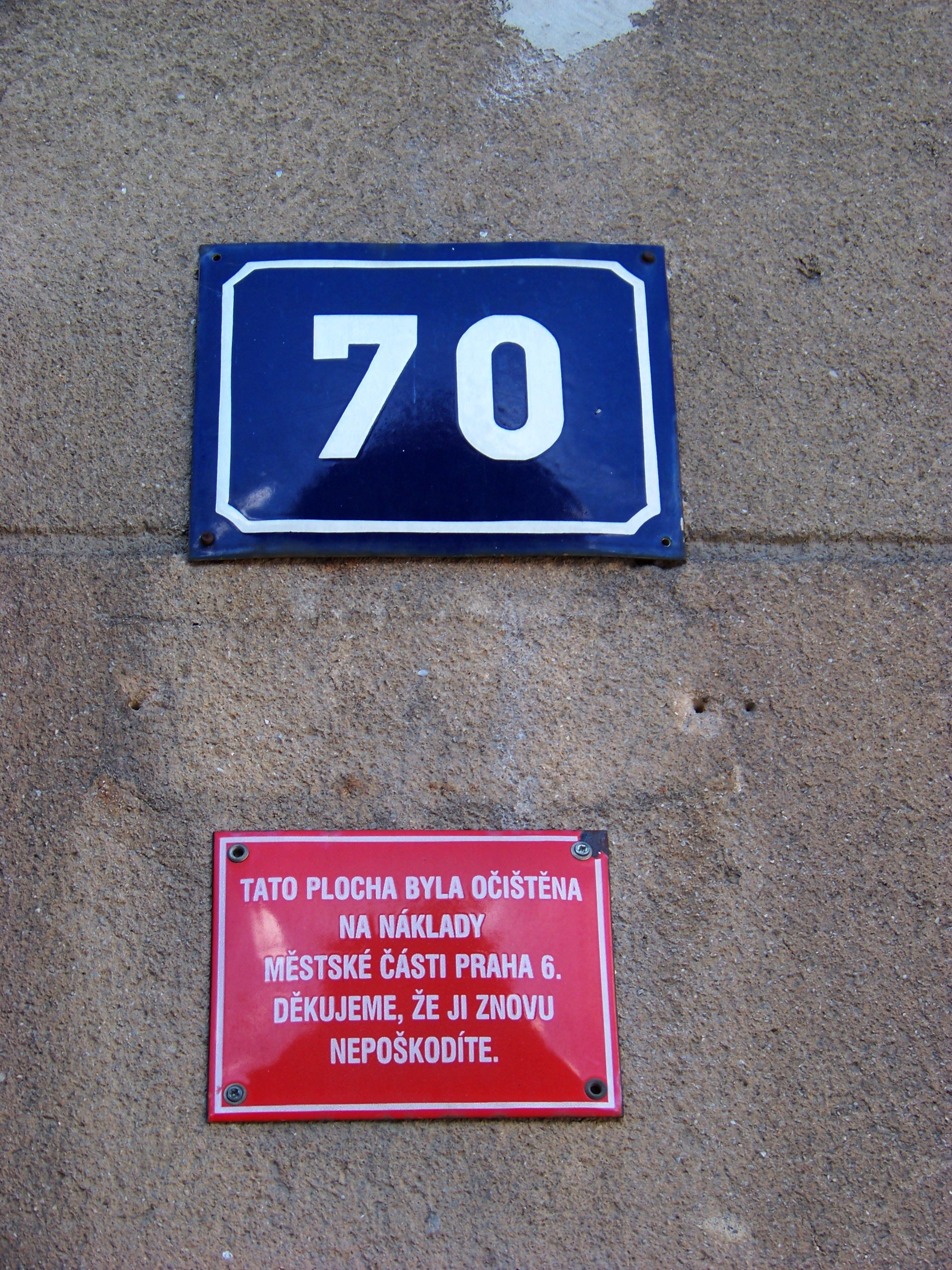
A graffiti abatement sign (lower) attached to a wall in Prague 6

A graffiti abatement sign on the Great Wall in Hebei, 1978

== Young Offender Graffiti Abatement Programs ==
Young offender graffiti abatement programs have been growing in popularity throughout Europe and Australia as an effective method to reduce local government costs while allowing young offenders to perform community service under supervision of welfare officers. Safe graffiti removal programs are developed in conjunction with government and graffiti remover chemical manufacturers.

== See also ==
- Anti-graffiti coating
- Broken windows theory
- Philadelphia Anti-Graffiti Network
