= The Original Magazine =

Arts magazine from Pennsylvania, US

- Categories: arts and culture
- Frequency: Semi-annual
- Circulation: 5,000
- Founder: Elana Schlenker
- Founded: 2006
- Country: Pittsburgh, Pennsylvania
- Language: English
- Website: http://www.originalmag.com

The Original Magazine (also known as The Original) is a semiannual magazine covering the arts scene in Pittsburgh. Founded in 2006 by Elana Schlenker as a nonprofit organization, The Original is supported by the Sprout Fund, and grants from various departments at the University of Pittsburgh, and The Original Hot Dog Shop. Printed copies are distributed free of charge throughout the Oakland neighborhood of Pittsburgh, including coffee shops, art galleries, and bookstores. The staff, mostly students, numbers around 50. The magazine publishers hold an annual "Arts and Crap Fair", allowing local artists to showcase and sell their work.

Over 300 people attended the magazine's 2007 issue's release party. The magazine's cover and table of contents design has received awards from the College Media Advisers. The magazine was displayed by the Pittsburgh American Institute of Graphic Arts during CONTEXT 2007, its annual graphic design showcase. In 2007, the University of Pittsburgh Student Government named The Original the "Best New Student Group".
