= Handmade Arcade =

Annual craft fair in Pittsburgh, Pennsylvania, United States

- Date: November
- Frequency: Annual
- Locations: Pittsburgh, Pennsylvania.
- Inaugurated: 2004

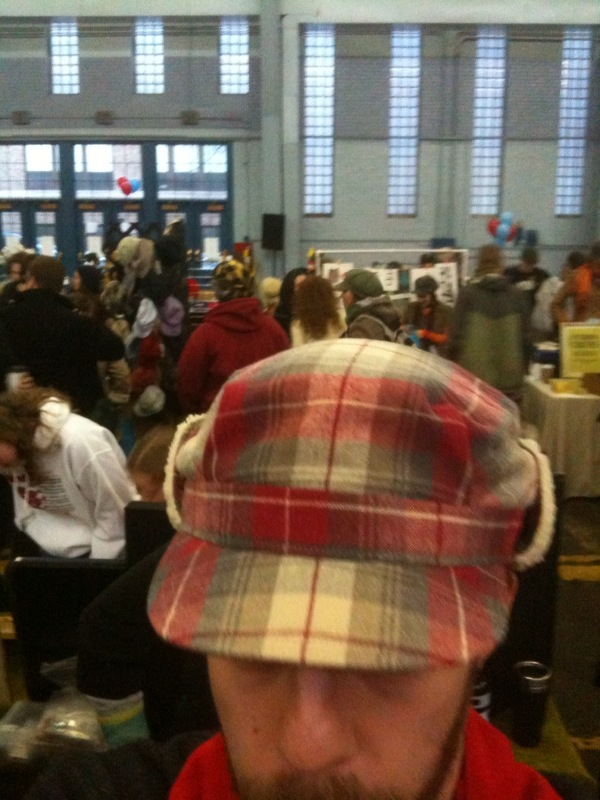
A felt hat purchased from the 2009 Handmade Arcade.

Handmade Arcade is an annual independent craft fair in Pittsburgh, Pennsylvania. The fair focuses on sustainable, upcycled, recycled, and eco-friendly materials and techniques. Vendors come from multiple states; in 2012, participants came from 15 different states. For example, some pieces include purses made from recycled books, camera straps constructed from vintage fabrics, jewelry made from found objects, pillows constructed from vintage T-shirts, and organic bath and body products. Attendance has reached 10,000. In 2007 and 2009, it won the People’s Choice Award for Best Arts Event from the Greater Pittsburgh Arts Council.

The first Handmade Arcade was held in 2004 at Construction Junction in Point Breeze. The founder was Gloria Forouzan of Lawrenceville. The Sprout Fund provided critical funding for that first event. That year, attendance was 1,000, with 60 vendors. In 2005, attendance and the number of vendors had doubled. The 2006 version saw 5,000 attendees.

In 2008, it had moved into the Hunt Armory. By 2011, attendance had grown to 7,000, allowing for a move to the David L. Lawrence Convention Center
