= Ora Lerman =

American painter and sculptor (1938–1998)

- Born: March 14, 1938; Campbellsville, Kentucky, U.S.
- Died: April 19, 1998 (aged 60)
- Movement: Feminist Art Movement
- Website: https://www.oralermantrust.com/oralerman

Ora Lerman (March 14, 1938 – April 19, 1998) was a Jewish-American painter and sculptor born in Campbellsville, Kentucky to a Jewish immigrant family. She received her Bachelor of Arts degree in fine arts at Antioch College and a Master of Fine Arts in painting from Pratt Institute. Lerman also attended Columbia University in 1969 for art history studies as well as the Brooklyn Museum Art School studying painting.

== Early life and education ==
Lerman was born March 14, 1938, in Campbellsville, Kentucky, to a Jewish-immigrant family. Her father was a shopkeeper. In the shop he kept a room full of mannequins, this later inspired Lerman to work with objects and symbols to represent personal statements in her pieces.

Lerman received her Bachelor of Arts degree in fine arts at Antioch College and her Master of Fine Arts in painting from Pratt Institute. In 1969 she attended Columbia University to study art history, then later at Brooklyn Museum Art School for painting.

Lerman received several prestigious awards and fellowships throughout her education and early career. In 1977, she was awarded a fellowship at the MacDowell Colony. She later received a fellowship from the Ossabaw Island Foundation in 1980. In 1984, Lerman was honored with an Andrew Mellon Fellowship. Four years later, in 1988, she was awarded a grant from the Pennsylvania State Council on the Arts. She was a four-time recipient of research grants in painting from the State University of New York (SUNY), receiving awards in 1972, 1974, 1976, and 1977. Lerman also earned a Fulbright research award to Japan, where she studied at Tama Art University from 1963 to 1965. During this time, she pursued private studies in calligraphy and Sumi-e.

== Feminist art movement ==
Lerman was part of the feminist art movement of the 1970s in New York City, serving as president of the New York chapter of the Women's Caucus for Art from 1978 through 1980.

== Career ==
In 1997 Lerman completed a mural entitled Inside the Ark. It was commissioned by the NYC Board of Education and installed in P.S. 113 at 4862 Broadway in Manhattan.

Lerman died on April 19, 1998. Her work is in the collection of the Jewish Museum in New York. In 2001 a retrospective of her work was held at the Hebrew Union College – Jewish Institute of Religion entitled Ora Lerman: I Gave You My Song.
