= The New Yinzer =

- Editor: Scott Silsbe
- Categories: Literary magazine
- Frequency: Triannually
- First issue: January 2002
- Final issue: Summer/Fall 2015
- Country: United States
- Based in: Pittsburgh
- Language: English
- Website: http://www.newyinzer.com/

The New Yinzer was an online literary magazine published in Pittsburgh. The primary means of publication was online, supplemented with occasional printed material. It was published triannually. The New Yinzer focused on Pittsburgh as inspiration. It focuses on first-time contributors; the editors have an open door policy to provide assistance to prospective authors. Contributors were paid in t-shirts. It was funded by the Sprout Fund.

== History and profile ==
The first issue was published online in January 2002. The early success of The New Yinzer was cited by the Pittsburgh Post-Gazette as part of a growing trend of Pittsburgh becoming better for young people. The content grew to include comics and an arts section. The first print book was published in February 2004

Jennifer Meccariello Layman and Dave Madden were the founders of The New Yinzer. The first editorial staff included Layman, Madden, Seth Madej and Margaret Emery, all of whom attended the University of Pittsburgh and wrote for the Pittsburgh City Paper and In Pittsburgh Weekly. By 2005, they began the process of seeking to pass on the magazine to new leadership, which they sought from among the Pittsburgh literary scene. The magazine was revived by Scott Silsbe and Ellie Gumlock, who took over in September 2006. Scott Silsbe served as managing editor. He is credited with giving The New Yinzer a renewed sense of purpose. The successful transition was cited by the Pittsburgh Quarterly as evidence of vibrancy of Pittsburgh's literary scene.

The editors hosted parties and public readings under the "TNY Presents..." banner. In 2010, the magazine sponsored ModernFormations, a forum for live music and local and out-of-town writers reading their works publicly. The magazine ended publication with the issue Summer/Fall 2015.
