= David Bonetti =

American art critic (c.1947–2018)

- Born: c. 1947
- Died: April 4, 2018 (aged 71); Brookline, Massachusetts, U.S.
- Education: Brandeis University
- Occupation: Art critic

David Bonetti (c. 1947 – April 4, 2018) was an American art critic.

== Early life ==
David Bonetti was born circa 1947 and grew up in Boston, Massachusetts. His father was Italian and his mother Irish. He graduated from Brandeis University in 1969.

== Career ==
Bonetti began his career as an art critic for the Boston Phoenix. He was an art critic for The San Francisco Examiner from 1989 to 2000, and The San Francisco Chronicle from 2000 to 2002. He later became the art critic for the St. Louis Post-Dispatch.

== Personal life and death ==
Bonetti was openly gay. He resided in Duboce Triangle, San Francisco, California, and retired in Brookline, Massachusetts, where he died on April 4, 2018, at the age of 71.
