= Philadelphia Anti-Graffiti Network =

Coordinates: 39.95405°N 75.16417°W

The Philadelphia Anti-Graffiti Network (PAGN) was founded in January 1984 by former Philadelphia Mayor Wilson Goode. The original goal of the program was to combat the spread of graffiti in the Philadelphia area and was led by Tim Spencer. In 1986 another program began within PAGN, named The Mural Arts Project (MAP), and headed by artist Jane Golden. Through the success of both programs in 1991 the city of Philadelphia was awarded the Innovations in American Government Award due to the progress PAGN and MAP had made in the surrounding communities. In 1996 the success of MAP was noted and split off into a separate program and placed under the umbrella of the Philadelphia Recreation Department. From the founding of these programs over 2,500 murals have been created across the city and over 40,000 walls cleaned of graffiti. The Philadelphia Anti-Graffiti Network currently consists of three programs; Mural Arts Program, Paint Voucher Program, and the Graffiti Abatement Team.

== History ==
A precursor is The Philadelphia Museum of Art's urban outreach project in the seventies. The program helped to create murals around Philadelphia to cover up the graffiti-covered buildings. The museum's program ended in 1983, a year prior to the beginning of the PAGN, which like its predecessor attempted to use murals to curb the rising graffiti problem.

While closely related to the Philadelphia Museum of Art's urban outreach project, the PAGN encompassed a larger goal with similar priorities. The program was originally created during a citywide crackdown on graffiti and accompanied other antigraffiti regulations and increases in penalties. Selling of spray paints to minors was prohibited as well as displaying unlocked cans of paint in stores, the latter to curb the common practice of shoplifting paints. Included with the increased penalties also came alternative forms of punishment such as forcing graffiti writers to clean graffiti as a form of community service and an amnesty program for identified "taggers" who signed pledges promising not to vandalize property anymore. The amnesty program accumulated over a thousand signatures between 1984 and 1991. Those found guilty of vandalism also had another option: apprenticeship in the PAGN program. The apprenticeship focused on taking the creative energy of the graffiti artists and helping them gain guidance from already established professional artists.

In 1996, the PAGN program was merged into the Philadelphia Recreation Department and MAP was elevated as an independent entity. From the MAP program came the Philadelphia Mural Arts Advocates, a not for profit corporation for raising funds for the MAP programs. While 1996 marked a greater position for MAP-it also was the year the PAGN founder, Tim Spencer, died. The roots of MAP was in a meeting with Jane Golden and Spencer in 1984 in which she asked to run a program within PAGN. Spencer originally envisioned a program that would move kids more towards other arts and crafts, however, Golden envisioned what is now the MAP program.

== Divisions ==
=== Graffiti Abatement Team ===
The Graffiti Abatement Team provides businesses, homeowners and community organizations with free painting and power-washing services in an effort to combat vandalism. The team on average handles up to 25 complaints related to graffiti a day and cleans upwards of 100,000 properties a year. Graffiti vandals who are apprehended and convicted are often given community service in the form of cleaning up graffiti around the city. Since its inception, over 3,000 graffiti artists have gone through the community service program under the supervision of the Graffiti Abatement Team. During the years of 2001-2004 under Mayor John F. Street's, Neighborhood Transformation Initiative, the Graffiti Abatement Team cleaned over 385,000 walls.

=== Paint Voucher Program ===
The Paint Voucher Program allows businesses, community groups and homeowners to request free paint for the purpose of cleaning up graffiti on their own properties. The program is funded from the same $1.125 million anti-graffiti budget.

=== Mural Arts Program ===
The Mural Arts Program was founded in 1984 by Jane Golden. Golden had met the then head of the PAGN in hopes of creating a program under the umbrella project, however, Spencer had originally envisioned a program that would take those caught away from graffiti and into other arts and crafts. Golden’s vision won out and the Mural Arts Program was created. The Mural Arts Program works with community groups to educate and involve children in arts and in creation of murals throughout the city. The MAP also takes in prosecuted graffiti vandals at the rate of over 100 a year and involves them in the creation of many of the murals around Philadelphia. During the 2001–2004 Neighborhood Transformation Initiative, MAP had painted over 600 murals around Philadelphia.

== Awards and recognition ==
It was in 1991 when the program received a milestone; not only in breaking the 1,000 mark for obtained amnesty pledges, but for also earning the 1991 Innovations in American Government Award for the city of Philadelphia for the manner in which PAGN is run. This was followed on February 1, 1994, with a tribute to PAGN for "10 years of changing attitudes and neighborhoods" by Lucien E. Blackwell, on behalf of the United States House of Representatives.

The Mural Arts Program is responsible for the largest mural painted in Philadelphia at 600 feet (180 m) in length, titled "History of Immigration", the mural displays settlers of different races who have settled in Philadelphia over time. The average mural painted by MAP is about the height of three-story row house and 35 feet (11 m) wide, the approximate cost is 10–15 thousand dollars, which includes artist commission and supplies.

MAP is currently one of Philadelphia's largest employers of artists, employing over 3,000 artists a year. Currently, MAP employs 36 former graffiti artists as staff members on permanent payroll and services over 300 children a year in their arts programs. In February 2006 the city of Watertown, NY asked Jane Golden to speak in hopes of creating a similar program in their area.

== See also ==
- Graffiti abatement
- Fixing Broken Windows
- Graffiti in the United States
