= Weave Magazine =

American literary magazine

- Editor: Laura E. Davis
- Categories: Literary magazine
- Frequency: Biannual
- Publisher: Weave Magazine
- First issue: 2008
- Final issue: Summer 2016
- Country: United States
- Based in: Pittsburgh
- Language: English
- Website: www.weavemagazine.net
- ISSN: 1948-1551
- OCLC: 326861457

Weave Magazine was an American literary magazine based in Pittsburgh. It was established in order to remedy a perceived gender imbalance in contemporary literary publishing. Weave published literary fiction, poetry, nonfiction, reviews and artwork biannually in January and July. The magazine was last published in 2016.

== History ==
Weave was established by Laura E. Davis and Margaret Bashaar in May 2008. It ensured that at least half of the work in each issue was created by women. Weave's vision of diversity expanded to feature work by LGBT writers, writers of color, writers of age and disabled writers, among other marginalized voices. Davis served as the editor-in-chief.

== Awards ==
The magazine, or pieces that have appeared in it, received the following awards:

- 2013 Verse Daily: "Push" by Kate Partridge and "Tantrum" by Suzanne Marie Hopcroft.
- 2012 Micro Award Finalist: Anthony Varallo's story, "All Very Surprising", which appeared in Weave issue 7.
- 2008 Seed Award from The Sprout Fund.
