= Jane Golden =

American painter

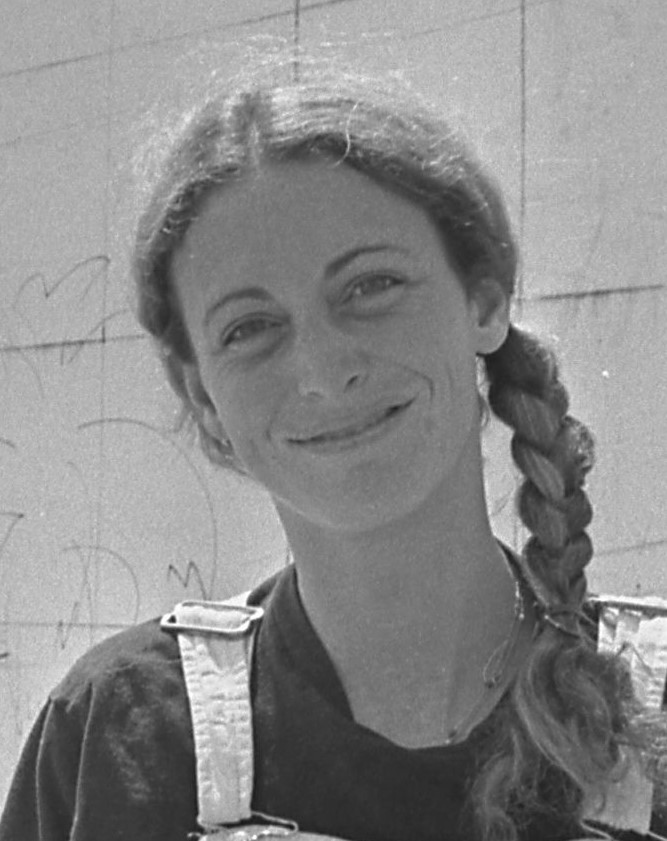
- Golden in 1981
- Education: Stanford University (BA); Rutgers University (MFA)
- Known for: Mural Arts Program

Jane Golden is an American artist who has been an active mural painter and community organizer since the 1970s.

== Background and education ==
Following graduation from Stanford University, Golden moved to Los Angeles and created a number of large, well received murals in the Los Angeles beach areas, particularly in Santa Monica, in the late 1970s and early 1980s. She was co-founder and director of the Los Angeles Public Art Foundation.

In 1985, following a diagnosis of lupus, Golden left California to be with her family in the Philadelphia area, where she had grown up. In 1984, she founded Mural Arts Philadelphia, which grew out of the Philadelphia Anti-Graffiti Network. The program was designed to fight graffiti in the city by giving graffiti artists a more productive artistic outlet. She quickly began working with at risk teens. Together, they painted murals throughout the city and were trained in practical working skills. The program grew, and the Mural Arts Program (MAP) has now created over 3600 murals to date.

Under Jane Golden's leadership, MAP transitioned to a comprehensive community service program in 1996, collaborating with various governmental agencies to transform individuals and communities through art. Golden's approach emphasizes honoring the voices of marginalized individuals, providing them with a platform for self-expression and community engagement. By fostering dialogue and cooperation, MAP helps to rebuild trust and validate the experiences of community members.

The collaborative process of designing a MAP project involves extensive community engagement. MAP leaders, including Jane Golden, hold regular meetings to listen to the collective voices of community members, discussing their problems, frustrations, hopes, and dreams. This dialogue is essential in developing mural designs that genuinely reflect the community's experiences and aspirations. The process ensures that the murals are not just art pieces but symbols of the community's identity and collective vision.

MAP's projects, such as the "Healing Walls," have facilitated dialogues between prisoners, crime victims, and community members, leading to mutual understanding and transformation. This initiative exemplifies how art can serve as a medium for healing and redemption, breaking down barriers and fostering empathy among diverse groups. Overall, MAP's impact extends beyond beautifying urban spaces; it actively engages residents in the artistic process, thereby promoting social cohesion, empowering individuals, and fostering a sense of community ownership and pride.

In 2003, Golden received a Visionary Woman Award from Moore College of Art & Design. Eisenhower Fellowships selected Jane Golden as a USA Eisenhower Fellow in 2003. She is an instructor at the Pennsylvania Academy of Fine Art and teaches at the University of Pennsylvania.

Supporters of Golden urged her to run for Mayor of Philadelphia in 2015, an idea Golden said she was "intrigued by.

== Art and community initiatives ==
Golden has become an important voice and organizer within the community. Under her leadership, the Philadelphia Mural Arts Program actively engages with critical issues in the area. Their Porch Light program spotlights mental illness issues and homelessness and addiction, in cooperation with the Department of Behavioral Health. Golden has taught at Graterford Prison for many years and has also spearheaded a collaborative project connecting inmates and juveniles at a correction facility with a Kensington neighborhood. Connections at Graterford brought Golden to a position where she could support conceptual artist Peggy Diggs, who worked with inmates to construct shelters for disaster survivors. Some bemoan the quality of the murals developed through local participation as a model for developing the murals, citing uneven quality, artist Stephen Powers identifies Golden's success in convincing civic authorities that art can be an agent of positive change.

In 1989, Golden painted a mural in the Point Breeze section of Philadelphia with a group of neighborhood children titled "Stop the Violence", in honor of children from that neighborhood that had been killed by gun violence. In 2018, this mural was destroyed when the wall of the rowhouse that contained it crumbled during the process of redevelopment, sparking controversy about the effects of gentrification in that neighborhood.

== Awards ==
- Katharine Hepburn Medal from Bryn Mawr College, Bryn Mawr PA, 2009
- Governor's Award for the Arts (Pennsylvania) 2012 – Arts Innovation, Erie PA, 2012
- Noam Chomsky Award, Justice Studies Association, 2013

== Publications ==
- Philadelphia Murals and the Stories They Tell, Temple University Press (2002). ISBN 9781566399517
- More Philadelphia murals and the stories they tell, Temple University Press (2006). ISBN 9781592135271
- Philadelphia Mural Arts @30, Temple University Press (2014). ISBN 9781439911310
