= The Sprout Fund =

- Formation: 2001
- Type: Non-profit
- Purpose: civic
- Headquarters: 5423 Penn Avenue; Pittsburgh, Pennsylvania
- Region served: Southwestern Pennsylvania
- Budget: $1.3 million
- Staff: 8

The Sprout Fund is a non-profit organization dedicated to funding various programs designed to increase civic engagement in Pittsburgh, Pennsylvania.

Sprout-funded murals were named the "Best Public Art" by the Pittsburgh City Paper in 2006.

The Sprout Fund hosts an annual fundraiser called "Hothouse", a "roving party". Most of that money funds the "Sprout Seed Awards", a series of small to moderate grants.

== Projects funded ==
- The New Yinzer
- The Original Magazine''
- Weave Magazine
- Handmade Arcade
- Conflict Kitchen

== See also ==
- Mural Arts Program, Philadelphia mural program
