= Lenka Clayton =

British-American conceptual artist and educator

- Born: 1977 (age 48–49); Cornwall, England
- Education: National Film and Television School, Central Saint Martins
- Website: www.lenkaclayton.com

Lenka Clayton (born 1977 Cornwall, England) is a British-American conceptual artist and educator based in Pittsburgh. Her work contemplates, exaggerates and defamiliarizes accepted rules and practices of everyday life, extending the ordinary to the poetic and absurd. Her work spans and expands upon many disciplines including film, video, performance, fibers, drawing and writing. Clayton has exhibited her art nationally and internationally.

== Biography ==
Lenka Clayton earned a Master of Arts in Documentary Direction from the National Film and Television School, and a Bachelor of Arts in Fine Art from Central Saint Martins, London.

Her materials are often culled from daily life and range from maps, letters, paper mail, clothing and stones to objects pulled from her son’s mouth. Her processes utilize unconventional systems and organizations, offering a world deconstructed, rearranged and newly envisioned.

Some exhibitions include the Carnegie Museum of Art in Pittsburgh, FRAC Le Plateau in Paris, Kunsthalle St. Gallen in Switzerland, Anthology Film Archives in New York City, and the Tehran International Documentary Festival in Iran.

She is an adjunct assistant professor of art at Carnegie Mellon University (CMU) as of 2016.

Clayton was named "Emerging Artist of the Year" in 2013 in Pittsburgh, Pennsylvania.

Her work is included in the permanent collections of the Metropolitan Museum of Art, New York; Blanton Museum of Art, University of Texas at Austin; Carnegie Museum of Art, Pittsburgh; Fabric Workshop and Museum, Philadelphia; and Crystal Bridges Museum of American Art, Bentonville.

Clayton has been represented by Catharine Clark Gallery, San Francisco since 2019.

== Selected works ==
=== Berlin (2003) ===
Berlin is a 2 × 1.5m municipal map of Berlin meticulously cut up into 39 different categories and cataloged in sealed bags. Clayton's categories include bags of schools, graveyards, and roads. Houses are crammed together tightly, while parks have more space in a larger bag due to their size and frequency.

=== Qaeda, quality, question, quickly, quickly, quiet (2004) ===
Qaeda, quality, question, quickly, quickly, quiet is a video of President George W. Bush's 2002 "Axis of Evil" speech cut and edited alphabetically. This piece also exists as a limited edition vinyl soundtrack.

=== 7,000 stones (2009) ===
7,000 Stones was created during Clayton's tenure as the Theodore Randall International Chair at Alfred University. The piece alludes to the lost artifacts of the Allen Steinheim Museum. Clayton's tiny, precise numbers hand-painted on 7,000 stones contemplate the many dispersed museum objects whose only remaining links to the missing collection are their painted acquisition numbers. Other works calling attention to the lost collection are Found Instructions 1 and Amnesty for the Museum.

=== Artist Residency in Motherhood (2012-2014) ===
Becoming a mother of two children further inspired Clayton's creative drive, and she devised for herself an Artist Residency in Motherhood. The residency took place within her home and was fully funded by various organizations, including the Robert C. Smith Fund, the Betsy R. Clark Fund of The Pittsburgh Foundation, and the Sustainable Arts Foundation. An artist residency situated within the family home "subverts the art-world’s romanticization of the unattached artist, and frames motherhood as a valuable site, rather than an invisible labour." Works produced during this time include: The Distance I Can Be From My Son, All Scissors in the House Made Safer, 63 Objects from My Son's Mouth, Women's Intuition (hats), Moons From Next Door, and One Brown Shoe, they are archived on-line at www.residencyinmotherhood.com. Works from Clayton's Artist Residency in Motherhood were exhibited at Pittsburgh Center for the Arts in 2012, in Complicated Labors, curated by Irene Lusztig & Natalie Loveless, at University of California Santa Cruz in 2014, and in State of the Art at Crystal Bridges Museum of American Art in Bentonville, in 2016.
