= Jon Rubin =

American artist and academic

- Born: Philadelphia, Pennsylvania
- Education: MFA, California College of Arts and Crafts. BFA, Pennsylvania Academy of Fine Arts
- Known for: social practice, video art, performance, and sculpture
- Movement: Social Practice
- Awards: Creative Capital, Creative Work Fund Grant, Americans For the Arts, Year in Review (Best in Public Art), Pittsburgh Center for the Arts Artist of The Year
- Website: http://www.jonrubin.net

Jon Rubin is an American contemporary artist based in Pittsburgh, Pennsylvania and a professor at Carnegie Mellon University.

== Projects ==
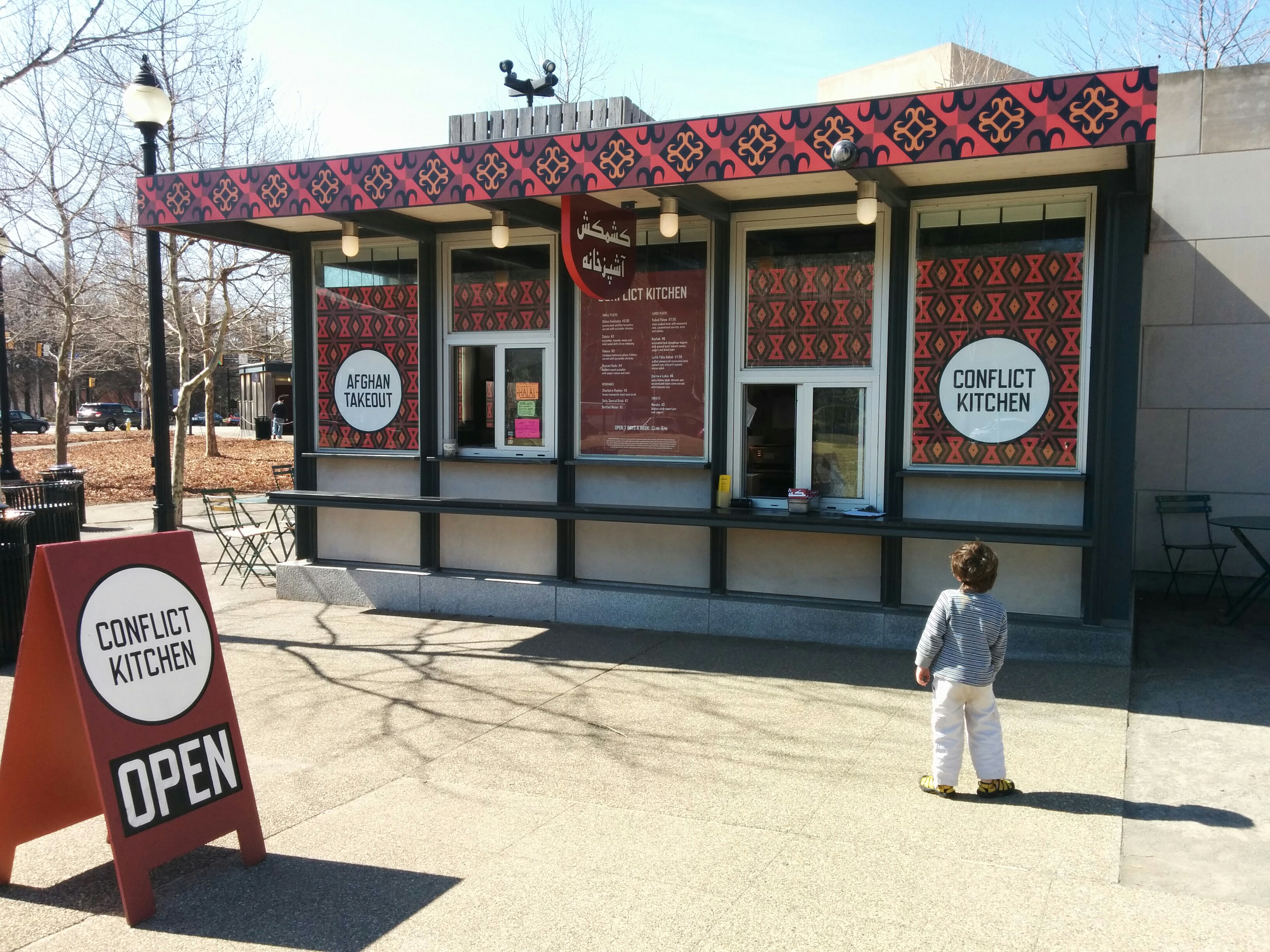
Conflict Kitchen in Schenley Plaza, Pittsburgh, Pennsylvania, with Afghanistan cuisine

=== Fruit and Other Things ===
Fruit and Other Things (2018-2019) is a project created in collaboration with artist Lenka Clayton commissioned by the Carnegie Museum of Art for the 2018 iteration of the Carnegie International. The project pulls from the specific context and history of the Carnegie International, which in its earliest years, selected artworks for its exhibitions from an international competition. From 1896 to 1931, artists submitted artworks to be considered for the exhibition, and the museum kept not only detailed records of the accepted works, but of those that were rejected as well. Over this 35 year span, 10,632 artworks were rejected from the exhibitions. In this project, Rubin and Clayton have hired a team of sign painters to meticulously render the titles of each rejected work, one by one. Each text painting is exhibited for a day, and then given away to visitors, totaling 10,632 paintings created, exhibited, and given away to the public over the course of the roughly six-month exhibition.

=== Thinking About Flying ===
Thinking About Flying was a project at Center for Curatorial Studies at Bard College (2011) and Museum of Contemporary Art Denver (2012) in which homing pigeons roosted in a pigeon loft on the museum roof and museum visitors were invited to take home a pigeon and release it. Upon releasing the pigeon from museum visitors' homes, the pigeon would fly back to the museum, and the cycle could repeat. Pigeons traveled distances increasing from a few blocks to over 400 miles. Over the one year duration of the project over 1000 people took and released pigeons from their homes.

=== The Last Billboard ===
The Last Billboard (2010–present), is a billboard founded and curated by Rubin in Pittsburgh, Pennsylvania.

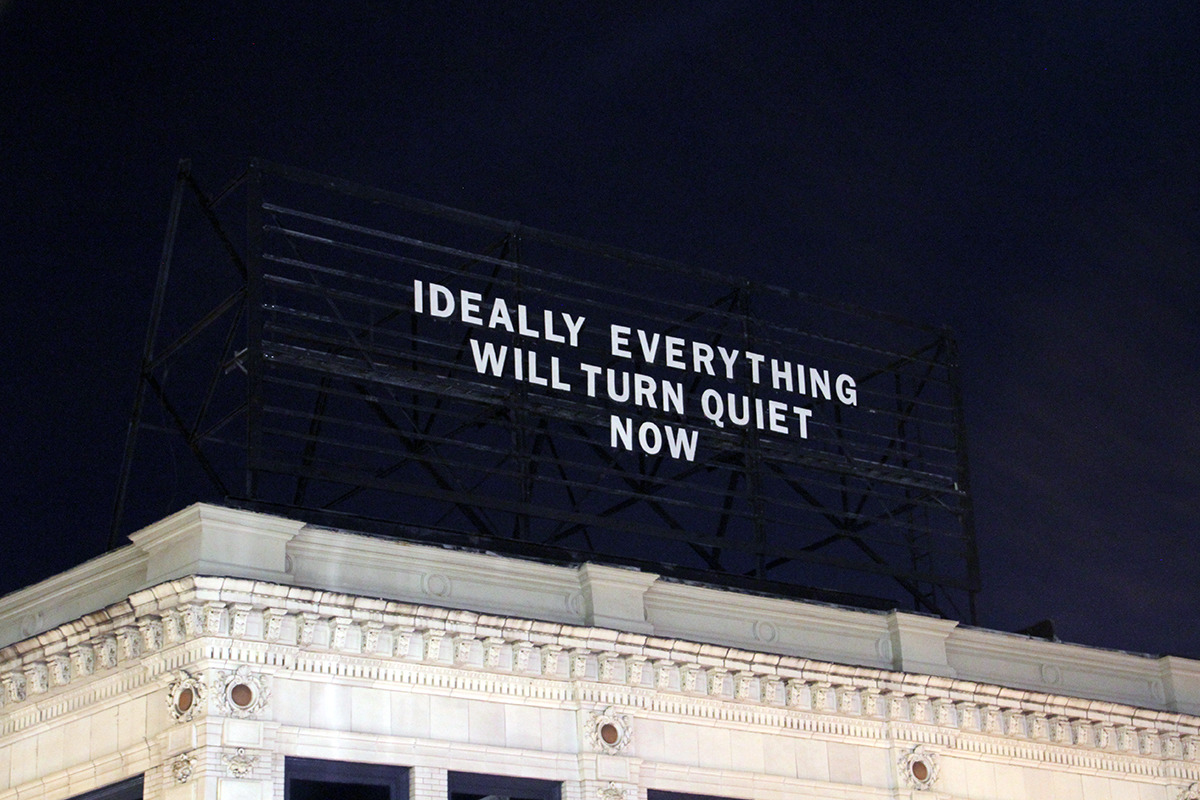
The Last Billboard, a project by artist Jon Rubin, featured a text by Laure Prouvost in Pittsburgh, Pennsylvania, November 2017.

In March 2018, a text by artist Alisha B. Wormsley stating "THERE ARE BLACK PEOPLE IN THE FUTURE" was removed after several weeks of display. According to statement by Rubin on April 3, 2018, originally posted to the project website, “Last week, The Last Billboard’s landlord, We Do Property, forced Alisha’s text to be taken down over objections to the content (through a never-before evoked clause in the lease that gives the landlord the right to approve text).”

=== ...circle through New York ===
...circle through New York (2017), for which the full title is A talking parrot, a high school drama class, a Punjabi TV show, the oldest song in the world, a museum artwork, and a congregation's call to action circle through New York, was a project in collaboration with artist Lenka Clayton commissioned by the Solomon R. Guggenheim Museum in New York City. In this project, from March 1 to August 31, 2017, six very different sites and communities participated in a complex system of exchange. The Guggenheim Museum (Upper East Side), Saint Philip's Church (Harlem), Pet Resources (South Bronx), Frank Sinatra School for the Arts (Queens), Jus Broadcasting (Queens), and the Institute for the Study of the Ancient World (Upper East Side), each with their own communities and audiences, were the participating institutions. The six organizations all lie along an imaginary circle drawn across the city. After extensive research, Clayton and Rubin selected one component from each location, as referenced in the title. For example, the talking parrot was selected from the Pet Resources in the South Bronx, while a museum artwork was selected from the Guggenheim Museum. The artwork on loan from the Guggenheim was Félix González-Torres's sculpture "Untitled" (Public Opinion) (1991). ...circle through New York was commissioned as part of the Guggenheim Social Practice initiative.

=== The Lovasik Estate Sale ===
For the 9th Shanghai Biennale in 2012, Rubin purchased an entire estate sale from a Pittsburgh family and shipped every item to Shanghai and hosted the estate sale during the exhibition. Once in Shanghai, the roughly 3000 items were arranged in the same way as the original estate sale.

=== Teaching ===
Job Rubin has been a professor at Carnegie Mellon University School of Art since 2006, and currently serves as the school's first Director of its MFA Program.
