= Cloud Column =

Sculpture by Anish Kapoor in Houston, Texas, U.S.

- Artist: Anish Kapoor
- Year: 1998-2006
- Medium: Stainless steel sculpture
- Dimensions: 8.92 m × 3.30 m × 2.03 m (29.25 ft × 10.83 ft × 6.67 ft)
- Weight: 2100 lbs
- Location: Glassell School of Art, Houston, Texas, U.S.; 29.7272°N 95.3907°W
- Website: Cloud Column

Cloud Column is a 30-foot, highly polished stainless steel sculpture created by Anish Kapoor and installed at the Brown Foundation Plaza on the Glassell School of Art campus in Houston, Texas, United States, in 2018. Kapoor began work on the sculpture in 1998 and completed it in 2006, making it a precursor to his better-known Cloud Gate (2006) in Chicago. Some Houstonians have given it the nickname El Frijole—a Texas regional variant of the Spanish word frijol, meaning "bean"—a playful echo of Cloud Gate's own nickname, "The Bean".

== Description ==
The hand-worked polished surface is a curved mirror. Its north side, facing the Glassell School of Art, has an oblong concave scoop (it curves inward). The reflection in the concave portion is upside-down: the clouds appear at the bottom, and the school and viewer hang inverted from the top. Its south side, facing the Lillie and Hugh Roy Cullen Sculpture Garden, is convex (bulging outward): the reflection is distorted into a wider, panoramic view.

The slightly mottled surface gives Cloud Column a more lively and organic reflectivity, more like moving water than a perfect mirror. It is one of the few sculptures by Kapoor with this effect.

== Artistic context ==
In the 1980s, Kapoor began exploring the idea of "the void" in his art. In some of these early pieces, he used pigment on large fiberglass structures to create an optical illusion, drawing the eye to it and tricking the viewer into believing there was a void: a space with no surface, a hole, an emptiness. The effect is disorienting and leaves the viewer feeling unsure whether the piece is two- or three-dimensional. This encourages the viewer to slow down and pause long enough to reorient themselves.

In 1995, he began exploring the same ideas in mirrored stainless steel. Instead of light-absorbing pigments, he used this light-reflecting material. Fabricating concave mirrors is technically difficult: the steel must be extremely well polished to provide a midpoint (a center of curvature) that does not disrupt the image, so that the surface seems to disappear—as in his earlier void works. He started with cast metal in pieces such as Turning the World Inside Out (1995), and later shifted to CNC machining, as for Cloud Gate. Cloud Column sits between these two eras of his practice.

== History ==
=== Commission and creation ===
Originally, the British Museum in London commissioned the sculpture to serve as a permanent contemporary centerpiece just outside the Reading Room of the Queen Elizabeth II Great Court, but the project fell through. Kapoor began work on the sculpture in 1998. The artist was on site during its manufacture in England, directing where the surfaces were hand-hammered and welded. He and his team spent five years making it, and another three years polishing it, completing it in 2006.

=== Acquisition and installation ===
Around 2014 or 2015, the Museum of Fine Arts, Houston chose to acquire the sculpture. It was transported from England to Galveston by ship, then trucked to Houston, where it remained in the museum's storage for about a year—including during Hurricane Harvey.

It was installed in March 2018. Using a 675-ton crane, the installation team hoisted the sculpture from the parking lot of First Presbyterian Church (Houston), over the Glassell School of Art building, and onto its 30-foot-deep piers, to which it was bolted and welded.

== Comparison with Cloud Gate ==
When Cloud Column was installed in Houston, many observers noted its similarities to Cloud Gate in Chicago, which is nicknamed "The Bean". Some Houstonians responded by nicknaming their sculpture El Frijole. "Frijole" is a Texas regional variant of the Spanish word frijol; both mean a single bean.

Kapoor's fabricator of 30 years publicly clarified that Cloud Column was created first. One key manufacturing difference reinforces this: while Cloud Gate has a completely smooth surface produced using computer programs and robotics, Cloud Column was hand-hammered and hand-welded, giving it a mottled surface that makes the hand of the artist more apparent.

The arrival of Cloud Column prompted a brief cultural skirmish between the two cities. A Chicago reporter derided Houston as a "cultureless abyss" and lamented that Houston was on course to surpass Chicago in population. Some Houstonians playfully responded by declaring Chicago a "has bean".

== Other works by Kapoor in Texas ==
- In Search of the Mountain I (1984), at Nasher Sculpture Center in Dallas
- Void #2 (1988–1991), at the Dallas Museum of Art
- Sky Mirror (2006), at AT&T Stadium in Arlington, Texas

== See also ==
- List of public art in Houston
