= Ilan Kapoor =

Canadian academic

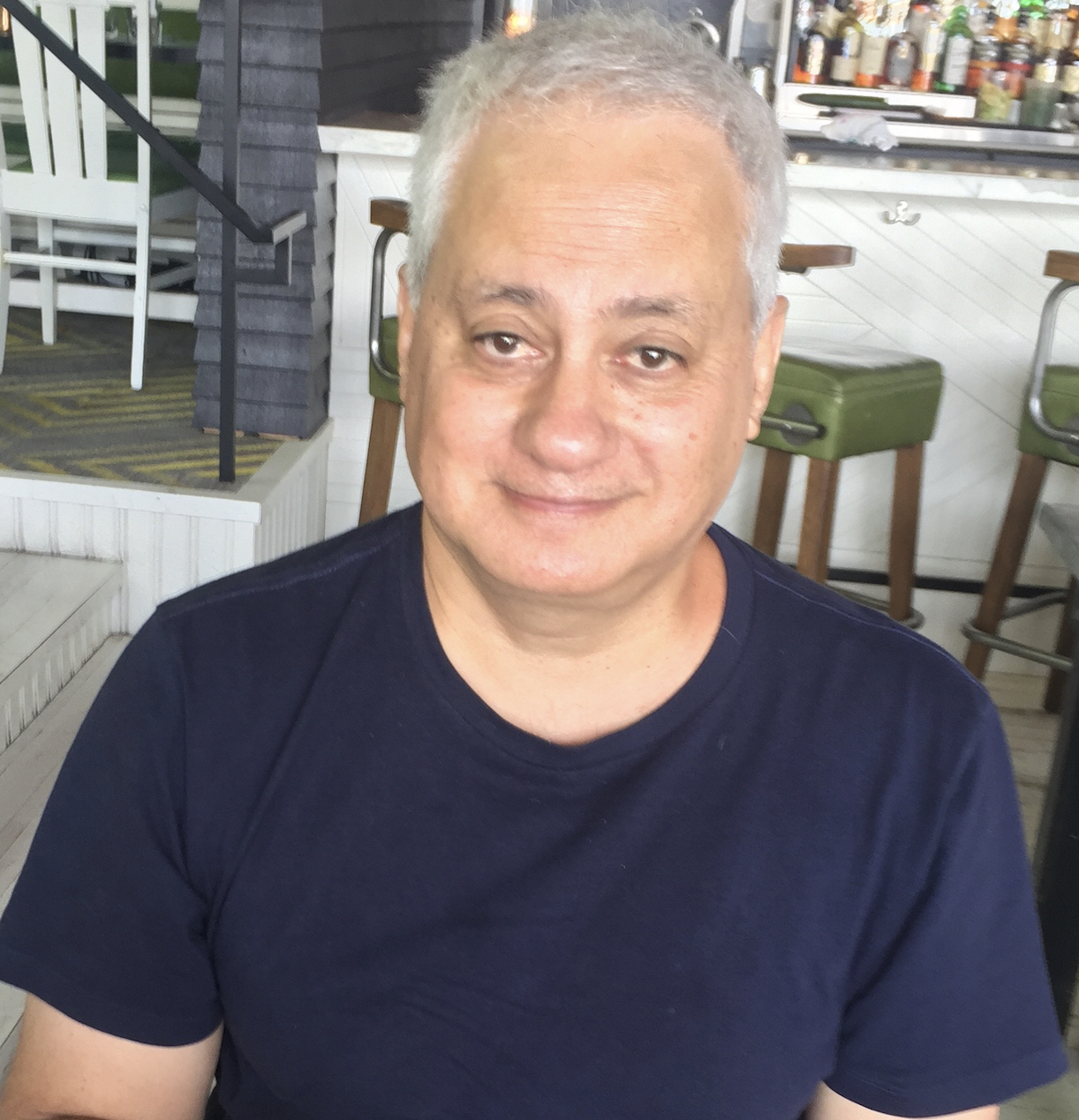
- Ilan Kapoor in 2023
- Born: August 26, 1959 (age 67); Mumbai, India
- Relatives: Anish Kapoor (brother)

Academic background
- Education: University of Toronto (Doctorate of Arts)

Academic work
- Discipline: development studies, comparative politics, political theory, psychoanalysis, postcolonialism, humanitarianism, global political economy, political ecology
- Institutions: York University (1998–present)
- Website: www.ilankapoor.com

Ilan Kapoor (born 1959) is a professor of Critical Development Studies at the Faculty of Environmental and Urban Change at York University in Toronto, Ontario, Canada. He is an influential postcolonial scholar, considered the first to bring both psychoanalysis and postcolonial analysis to the field of Development Studies. He is the author of seven books and numerous articles on postcolonial politics, psychoanalysis, participatory development, and celebrity humanitarianism. In 2025, Kapoor was inducted as a Fellow into the Royal Society of Canada.

== Work on participation ==
Kapoor first came to prominence in the early 2000s through a series of influential journal articles on participatory development (the practice of involving beneficiaries of international development programs in decision-making). Kapoor is critical of such a practice, arguing that while it looks noble and promising (when adopted by the World Bank or any other international agency), it is often an excuse to further neoliberal policies, and can even result in authoritarian and exclusionary practices. In 2004, Kapoor's critique helped frame an issue of Current Issues in Comparative Education (published at Columbia University).

== Work on postcolonialism ==
Kapoor's 2008 book, The Postcolonial Politics of Development, is a collection of essays written between 2002-2007. The book is one of the first to analyze development issues from a postcolonial perspective. It has received many positive reviews. Kapoor examines recent international development policy areas (governance, human/gender rights, participation), carrying out a cultural and political economy critique of them. He argues that development practitioners and westernized elites are often complicit in perpetuating contemporary forms of imperialism. The book concludes by arguing for the need for a radical self-reflexivity on the part of development workers, institutions and academics; while at the same time emphasizing the political strategies of marginalized groups that can lead to greater democratic dialogue.

Ilan Kapoor is the brother of artist Anish Kapoor. The latter has designed the book covers for Kapoor's 2008, 2020 and 2021 books.

In September 2017, Kapoor resigned as editorial board member of the journal Third World Quarterly (along with roughly half of the journal's editorial board members) in protest against the journal publishing an article making a "case for colonialism."

== Work on celebrity humanitarianism ==
Kapoor's book, Celebrity Humanitarianism: The Ideology of Global Charity (2012), is one of the first to critically assess the relatively new phenomenon of global celebrity philanthropy (by the likes of Bono, Geldof, Angelina Jolie, Madonna, Bill Gates, George Soros). The author carries out a stinging critique of celebrity charity work and corporate philanthropy. He shows how this charity is not just self-promoting, but also helps justify and worsen the global inequality brought about by capitalism. Kapoor also draws attention to what he sees as a new phenomenon of "spectacular NGOs," not-for-profit development organizations such as Save Darfur or Medecins Sans Frontieres (Doctors Without Borders) that don’t just get celebrity endorsements but seek out celebrity status themselves. He takes them to task for being more interested in branding, spectacle and short-term results than addressing broader and long-term problems of social inequality and political inclusion.

== Work on psychoanalytic politics ==
Kapoor's books, Confronting Desire: Psychoanalysis and International Development (2020) and Psychoanalysis and the GlObal (2018), investigate how the unconscious "speaks out" in various guises: from obsessions about growth and poverty to the perverse seductions of racism and over-consumption, from disavowal of the climate crisis to the social and cultural traumas engendered by globalization. For Kapoor, the unpredictability and excess of unconscious desire are not only the source of "irrationality" but also a political resource for breaking out of the global capitalist status quo. He examines, for example, the political and psychoanalytic bases of revolutionary movements such as the Arab Spring.

Kapoor's book Universal Politics (2021), co-authored with Zahi Zalloua, argues for a negative universality rooted in social antagonism (shared experiences of marginalization) and envisions a common solidarity of the excluded. For the authors, such a conception of universality avoids the trap of neocolonial universalism and the narrow particularism of identity politics. The book examines what a universal politics could look like in such key current global sites of struggle as climate change, workers' struggles, the Palestinian question, the refugee crisis, Black Lives Matter, #MeToo, political Islam, Morales's universalist state in Bolivia, the European Union, and COVID-19.

Kapoor's 2023 co-authored book, Global Libidinal Economy, is the first to examine international political economy with a psychoanalytic lens. The book focuses on key political economy categories such as consumption, production, trade, financialization, and ecology, claiming for example that consumption is not only a way of satisfying a need but aimed at soothing a deeply held sense of loss; or that capital is accompanied by unconscious "drive" that seduces and beguiles in the service of endless profit-making. The book also examines the gender and racial dimensions of global political economy, suggesting that unconscious desire/enjoyment of domination is integral to capital accumulation.

Kapoor's 2024 co-authored book, Rethinking Development Politics, examines development politics with a psychoanalytic lens, reassessing it in relation to Modernization, Postdevelopment/Decoloniality, and Marxist political economy. The book distinguishes the psychoanalytic approach from the latter schools of thought by focusing on present-day case studies, including digital and green modernization, trade, neopopulism, anti-racist training, and radical politics in Iran's Women, Life, Freedom movement.

== Articles and Op-eds ==
=== Academic articles and book chapters ===
Kapoor has published over 70 academic journal articles and book chapters spanning critical development studies, postcolonial theory, political economy, psychoanalysis, and environmental politics. His earlier scholarship examined participatory development, the politics of representation, neoliberal globalization, and the relationship between development institutions and power. His subsequent work has increasingly drawn on Marxist and Lacanian psychoanalytic theory to investigate ideology, desire, capitalism, and global inequality. More recent publications address such subjects as neofeudal capitalism, decoloniality, anti-Blackness, universality, political ecology, and the environmental contradictions of capitalist development. His articles have appeared in journals including Third World Quarterly, Political Geography, Antipode, Theory, Culture & Society, Environment and Planning D: Society and Space, Philosophy & Social Criticism, Rethinking Marxism, Globalizations, and the Canadian Journal of Development Studies. His book chapters have appeared in edited collections addressing international development, postcolonialism, psychoanalysis, and critical social theory.

=== Op-eds and public commentary ===
Alongside his academic scholarship, Kapoor has written numerous opinion articles and political commentaries for international news and public affairs publications, including Al Jazeera English, The Conversation, Social Europe, and The Loop. His public writing applies critical political economy and postcolonial analysis to contemporary international affairs, addressing such subjects as global capitalism, neofeudalism, international debt, economic inequality, Western foreign policy, corporate power, and the politics of international development. His commentaries have also examined celebrity humanitarianism, racial and social inequality, the politics of decolonization, and geopolitical developments involving the United States, the Middle East, and the Global South. Recent articles in Al Jazeera have addressed the implications of US policy towards Iran, the international debt burden on developing countries, the emergence of BRICS as a geopolitical bloc, and the relationship between corporate power and contemporary political leadership.

== Recognition & Awards ==
In 2025, Kapoor was inducted as a Fellow into the Royal Society of Canada, considered the highest honour for a Canadian academic and awarded to those “who have made remarkable contributions in the arts, the humanities and the sciences, as well as in Canadian public life.”

Kapoor's work has been positively reviewed and endorsed, often by famous global academics. In assessing his 2008 book, The Postcolonial Politics of Development, the Journal of Peace Research states, “[t]his excellent book translates postcolonial theory into existing discourses of Development Studies ... [T]his book represents a small theoretical revolution that will hopefully make academia better prepared to grasp the meanings of politics in the postcolonial world.” On Kapoor's work on psychoanalytic politics, philosopher and global public intellectual Slavoj Žižek writes that it "brilliantly confirms Jacques Lacan’s thesis that the unconscious is political … Ilan Kapoor's [work] is obligatory reading, not only for those who want to penetrate the dark underside of our social life but also for those who want to bring out the economic and political mediation of our most intimate traumas.” Similarly, global postcolonial critic and academic, Gayatri Chakravorty Spivak (Columbia University), sees Kapoor's research as “required reading,” noting that “[m]ovements for change must take it into account.” Acclaimed scholar and trade activist, Walden Bello assesses Kapoor's recent psychoanalytic work as "path-breaking ... seek[ing] to create the theoretical arsenal that will plumb capitalism's dark [and irrational] side." And the University of Sussex’s Department of Development Studies has stated that Kapoor is “one of the greatest critical thinkers" in Development Studies.

Kapoor's 2023 co-authored book, Global Libidinal Economy, is the subject of special book forums in the journals, Distinktion: Journal of Social Theory and Rethinking Marxism. Kapoor's co-authored 2024 book, Rethinking Development Politics, is the subject of a special book forum in the Canadian Journal of Development Studies. Kapoor's 2020 monograph, Confronting Desire: Psychoanalysis and International Development, is the subject of a forum in Contexto Internacional.

Kapoor has been awarded prizes for "Excellence in Research" and in teaching at his university (York University).
