= Cloud Gate =

Sculpture by Anish Kapoor in Chicago

- Cloud Gate in 2007

- Location in Chicago
- Artist: Anish Kapoor
- Year: 2006
- Medium: Stainless steel sculpture
- Dimensions: 10 m × 13 m × 20 m (33 ft × 42 ft × 66 ft)
- Location: Millennium Park, Chicago, Illinois, U.S.; 41°52′58″N 87°37′24″W
- Website: www.chicago.gov/city/en/depts/dca/supp_info/chicago_s_publicartcloudgateinmillenniumpark.html

Cloud Gate is a public sculpture by artist Anish Kapoor that is the centerpiece of Grainger Plaza at Millennium Park in the Loop community area of Chicago, Illinois, United States. Constructed between 2004 and 2006, the sculpture is nicknamed "The Bean" because of its fabiform shape. Made up of 168 stainless steel plates welded together, its reflective and highly polished exterior has no visible seams. It measures 33 by 66 by 42 feet (10 by 20 by 13 m), and weighs 110 short tons (100 t; 98 long tons). The sculpture and its plaza are located above Millennium Hall, between the Chase Promenade and McCormick Tribune Plaza & Ice Rink.

Kapoor's design was inspired by liquid mercury and the sculpture's surface reflects and distorts the city's skyline and clouds moving overhead. Visitors are able to walk around and under Cloud Gate's 12-foot (3.7 m) high arch. On the underside is the "omphalos" (from Greek ὀμφαλός 'navel'), a concave chamber that warps and multiplies reflections. The sculpture builds upon many of Kapoor's artistic themes, and it is popular with tourists as a photo-taking opportunity for its unique reflective properties.

The sculpture was the result of a design competition. After Kapoor's design was chosen, numerous technological concerns regarding the design's construction and assembly arose, in addition to concerns regarding the sculpture's upkeep and maintenance. Various experts were consulted, some of whom believed the design could not be implemented. Eventually, a feasible method was found, but the sculpture's construction fell behind schedule. It was unveiled in an incomplete form during the Millennium Park grand opening celebration in 2004, before being concealed again while it was completed. Cloud Gate was formally dedicated on May 15, 2006, and has since gained considerable popularity, both domestically and internationally.

== Design ==
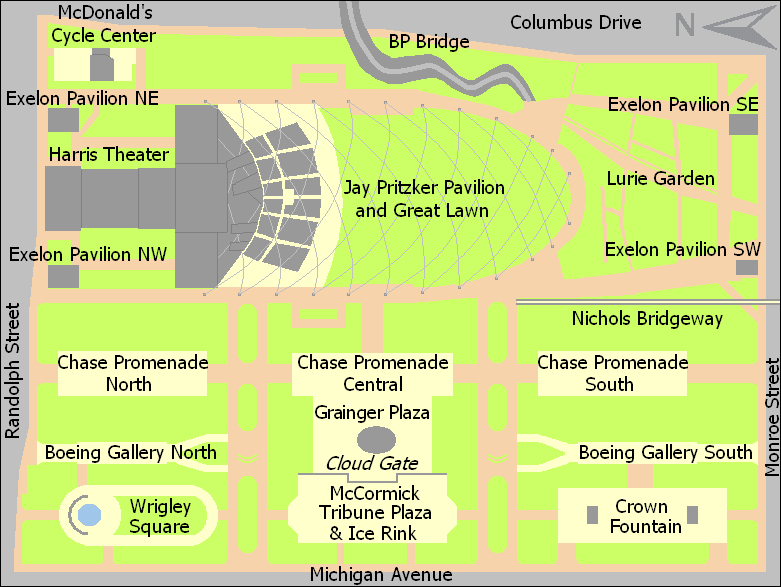
Image map of Millennium Park; east is at the top. Each feature or label is linked.

Lying between Lake Michigan to the east and the Loop to the west, Grant Park has served as Chicago's "front yard" since the mid-19th century. Its northwest corner, north of Monroe Street and the Art Institute, east of Michigan Avenue, south of Randolph Street, and west of Columbus Drive, had been Illinois Central rail yards and parking lots until 1997, when it was made available for development by the city as Millennium Park. In 2007, the park was Chicago's second largest tourist attraction, trailing only Navy Pier.

In 1999, Millennium Park officials and a group of art collectors, curators and architects reviewed the artistic works of 30 different artists and asked two for proposals. American artist Jeff Koons submitted a proposal to erect a permanent 150-foot (46 m) sculpture of a playground slide; his glass and steel design featured an observation deck 90 feet (27 m) above the ground that was accessible via an elevator. The committee chose the second design by internationally acclaimed artist Anish Kapoor. Measuring 33 by 66 by 42 feet (10 by 20 by 13 m) and weighing 110 short tons (100 t; 98 long tons), the proposal featured a seamless, stainless steel surface inspired by liquid mercury. This mirror-like surface would reflect the Chicago skyline, but its elliptical shape would distort and twist the reflected image.

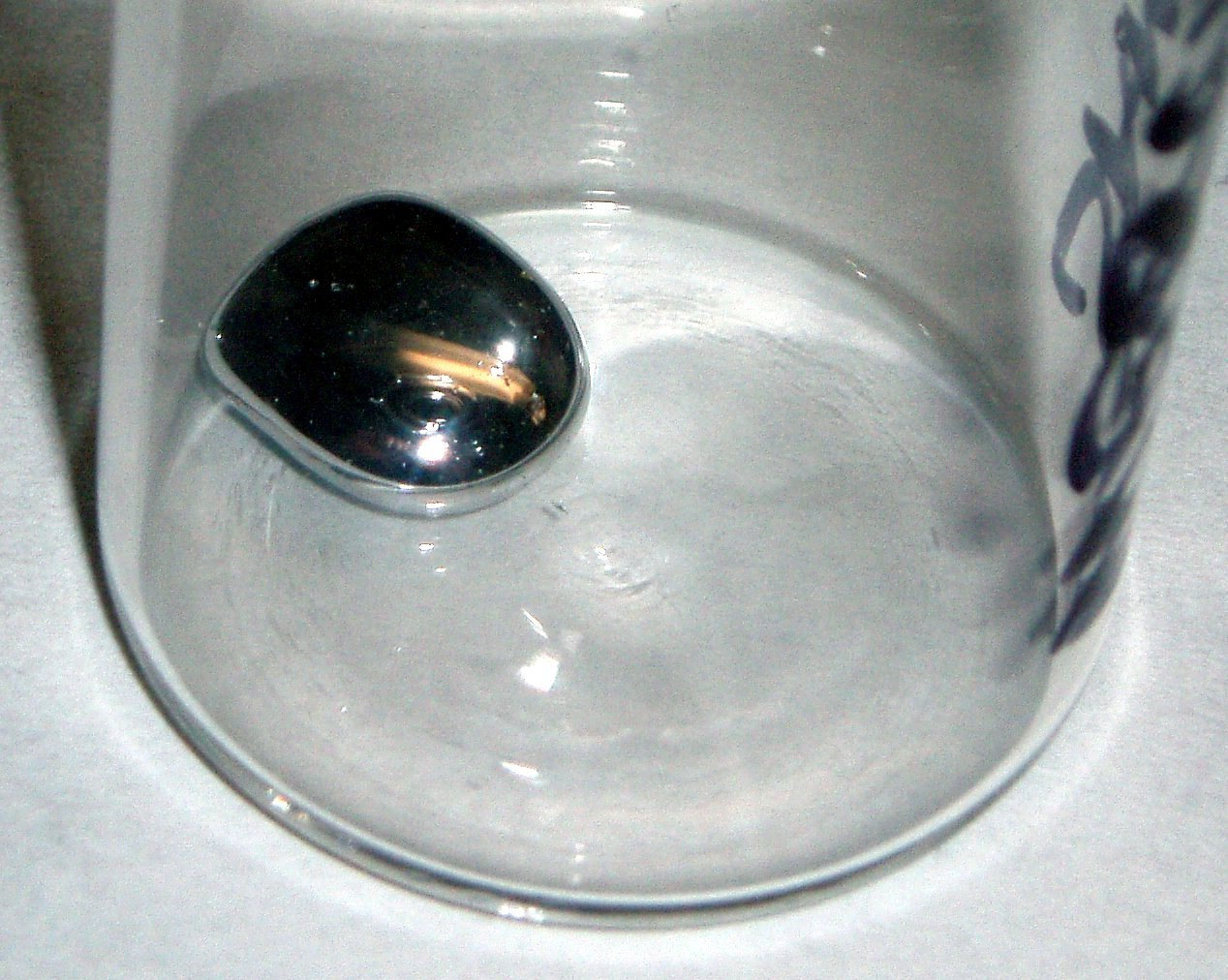
The design was inspired by liquid mercury.

In the underside of the sculpture is the omphalos, an indentation whose mirrored surface provides multiple reflections of any subject situated beneath it. The apex of the omphalos is 27 feet (8.2 m) above the ground. The concave underside allows visitors to walk underneath to see the omphalos, and through its arch to the other side so that they view the entire structure. During the grand opening week in July 2004, press reports described the omphalos as the "spoon-like underbelly". The stainless steel sculpture was originally envisioned as the centerpiece of the Lurie Garden at the southeast corner of the park. However, Park officials believed the piece was too large for the Lurie Garden and decided to locate it at what is now known as Grainger Plaza, despite Kapoor's objections. Skyscrapers to the north along East Randolph Street, including The Heritage, the Smurfit-Stone Building, Two Prudential Plaza, One Prudential Plaza, and Aon Center are visible, reflected on both the east and west sides of the sculpture. Around the structure, its surface acts like a fun-house mirror as it distorts their reflections.

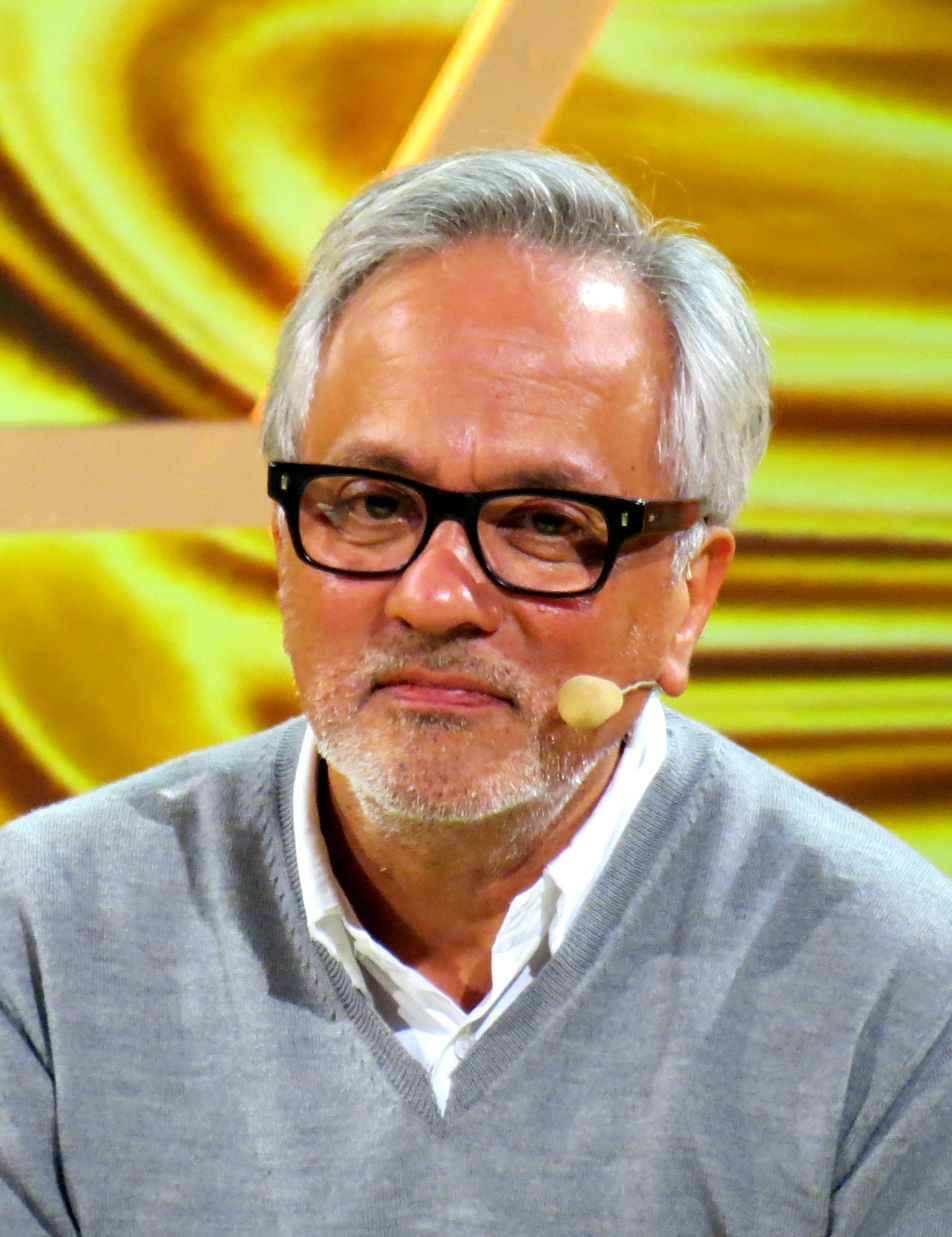
Anish Kapoor's design proposal was chosen over works by 30 different artists.

Although Kapoor does not draw with computers, computer modeling was essential to the process of analyzing the complex form, which created numerous issues. Since the sculpture was expected to be outdoors, concerns arose that it might retain and conduct heat in a way that would make it too hot to touch during the summer and so cold that one's tongue might stick to it during the winter. The extreme temperature variation between seasons was also feared to weaken the structure. Graffiti, bird droppings and fingerprints were also potential problems, as they would affect the aesthetics of the surface. The most pressing issue was the need to create a single seamless exterior for the external shell, a feat architect Norman Foster once believed to be nearly impossible.

While the sculpture was being constructed, public and media outlets nicknamed it "The Bean" because of its shape, a name that Kapoor described as "completely stupid". Months later, Kapoor officially named the piece Cloud Gate. (Kapoor eventually accepted the nickname of "The Bean".) Critical reviews describe the sculpture as a passage between realms. Three-quarters of the sculpture's external surface reflects the sky and the name refers to it acting as a type of gate that helps bridge the space between the sky and the viewer. In 2008, the sculpture and plaza were sometimes referred to jointly as "Cloud Gate on the AT&T Plaza" (as Grainger Plaza was then called). It is Kapoor's first public outdoor work in the United States, and is the work by which he is best known in the country according to the Financial Times.

== Construction and maintenance ==
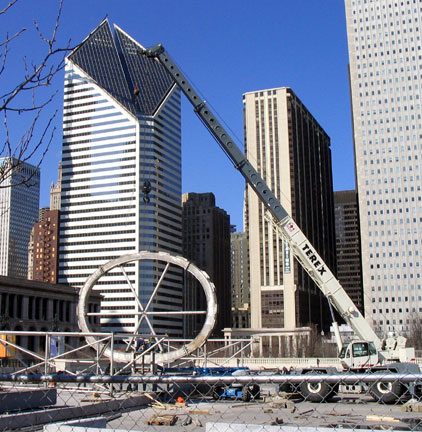
In 2004, the first of two internal support rings for the sculpture was erected in Millennium Park, on what is now Grainger Plaza.

The British engineering firm Atelier One provided the sculpture's structural design. They started out with a wooden model, then transitioned into a digital image that was sent to multiple potential fabricators to make sample sheets of steel. These sample sheets of steel would help Kapoor choose who he would want to work with for the project. After seeking out three potential firms, Kapoor would end up choosing Performance Structures, Inc. Kapoor chose this team because they returned the highest quality sample and because of their ability to produce nearly invisible welds. Initially, PSI planned to build and assemble the sculpture in Oakland, California, and ship it to Chicago through the Panama Canal and St. Lawrence Seaway. However, this plan was discarded after park officials deemed it too risky, so the decision was made to transport the individual panels by truck and to assemble the structure on-site, a task undertaken by MTH Industries.

The sculpture's weight raised concerns. Estimating the thickness of the steel needed to create the sculpture's desired aesthetics before fabrication was difficult. Cloud Gate was originally estimated to weigh 60 short tons (54 t; 54 long tons) when completed. However, the final figure was almost twice as heavy at 110 short tons (100 t; 98 long tons). This extra weight required engineers to reconsider the sculpture's supporting structures. The roof of the restaurant Millennium Hall, formerly known as Park Grill, upon which Cloud Gate sits, had to be built strong enough to bear the weight. The large retaining wall separating Chicago's Metra train tracks from the North Grant Park garage supports much of the weight of the sculpture and forms the back side of the restaurant. This wall, along with the rest of the garage's foundation, required additional bracing before the piece was erected. Cloud Gate is further buttressed by lateral members underneath the plaza that are anchored to the sculpture's interior structure by tie rods.

Inside Cloud Gate's polished exterior shell are several steel structures that keep the sculpture standing. PSI contracted Advanced Building and Metal Fabrication of Chico, California, to build them. The first structural pieces, two type 304 stainless steel rings, were put into place in February 2004. As construction continued, crisscrossing pipe trusses were assembled between the two rings. The trusses and supporting structures were only present for the construction phases. The finished sculpture has no inner bracing. The supporting structural components were designed and constructed to ensure that no specific point was overloaded, and to avoid producing unwanted indentations on the exterior shell. The frame was also designed to expand and contract with the sculpture as temperatures fluctuate. As a result, the two large rings supporting the sculpture move independently of each other, allowing the shell to move independently of the rings.

When Cloud Gate's interior components were completed, construction crews prepared to work on the outer shell; this comprises 168 stainless steel panels, each 3/8 inch (10 mm) thick and weighing 1,000 to 2,000 pounds (450 to 910 kg). They were fabricated using three-dimensional modeling software. Computers and robots were essential in the bending and shaping of the plates, which was performed by English wheel and a robotic scanning device. Metal stiffeners were welded to each panel's interior face to provide a small degree of rigidity. About a third of the plates, along with the entire interior structure, were fabricated in Oakland. The plates were polished to 98 percent of their final state and covered with protective white film before being sent to Chicago via trucks. Once in Chicago, the plates were welded together on-site, creating 2,442 linear feet (744 m) of welded seams. Welders used keyhole welding machines rather than traditional welding guns. The plates were fabricated so precisely that no on-site cutting or filing was necessary when lifting and fitting them into position.

When construction of the shell began in June 2004, a large tent was erected around the piece to shield it from public view. Construction began with the omphalos, where plates were attached to the supporting internal steel structure, from the inside (underside) of the sculpture downward to the outermost surfaces. This sequence caused the structure to resemble a large sombrero when the bottom was complete.

The shell of Cloud Gate was fully erected for the grand opening of Millennium Park on July 15, 2004, although it was unpolished and thus unfinished, because its assembly had fallen behind schedule. The piece was temporarily uncovered on July 8 for the opening, although Kapoor was unhappy with this as it allowed the public to see the sculpture in an unfinished state. The original plan was to re-erect the tent around the sculpture for polishing on July 24, but public appreciation for the piece convinced park officials to leave it uncovered for several months. The tent was again erected in January 2005 as a 24-person crew from Ironworkers Local 63 polished the seams between each plate. In order to grind, sand and polish the seams, six levels of scaffolding were erected around the sides of the sculpture, while climbing ropes and harnesses were used to polish harder-to-reach areas. When the upper and side portions of the shell were completed, the tent was once again removed in August 2005. On October 3, the omphalos was closed off as workers polished the final section. Every weld on the Cloud Gate underwent a five-stage process, required to produce the sculpture's mirror-like finish.

| Stage | Name | Equipment used | Sandpaper type | Purpose |
|---|---|---|---|---|
| 1 | Rough cut | 5-pound (2.3 kg), 4½-inch (110 mm) electric grinder | 40-grit | Removed welded seams |
| 2 | Initial contour | 15-pound (6.8 kg), 2-inch (51 mm), air-driven belt sander | 80-grit, 100-grit and 120-grit | Shaped the weld contours |
| 3 | Sculpting | air-driven 10-pound (4.5 kg), 1-inch (25 mm) belt sander | 80-grit, 120-grit, 240-grit and 400-grit | Smoothed the weld contours |
| 4 | Refining | double action sander | 400-grit, 600-grit and 800-grit | Removed the fine scratches that were left from the sculpting stage |
| 5 | Polishing | 10-inch (250 mm) electric buffing wheel | 10 pounds (4.5 kg) of rouge | Buffed and polished the surface to a mirror-like finish |

Cloud Gate was finally completed on August 28, 2005, and officially unveiled on May 15, 2006. The cost for the piece was first estimated at $6 million; this had escalated to $11.5 million by the time the park opened in 2004, with the final figure standing at $23 million in 2006. No public funds were involved; all funding came from donations from individuals and corporations.

Kapoor's contract states that the constructed piece should be expected to survive for 1,000 years. The lower 6 feet (1.8 m) of Cloud Gate is wiped down twice a day by hand, while the entire sculpture is cleaned twice a year with 40 US gallons (33 imp gal; 150 L) of liquid detergent. The daily cleanings use a Windex-like solution, while the semi-annual cleanings use Tide. A notable February 2009 incident saw two names etched in letters about 1 inch (25 mm) tall on the northeast side of the curved sculpture. The graffiti was removed by the same firm that did the original polishing.

In August 2023, the City of Chicago began renovation and construction work on Grainger Plaza, which also closed public access to Cloud Gate. The work involved accessibility improvements, including ramps and new steps, replacing pavers, and waterproofing. After being behind fencing for most of a year, the sculpture was reopened to the public on June 23, 2024.

== Reception ==
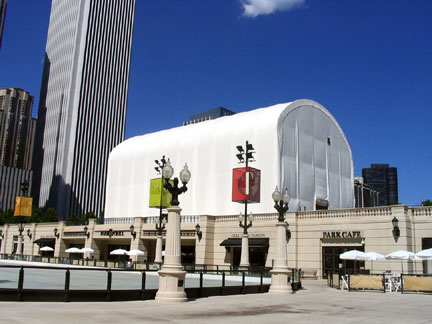
A tent was erected to cover Cloud Gate while it was being polished in 2004 and 2005.

Chicago Mayor Richard M. Daley declared the day of the sculpture's dedication, May 15, 2006, to be "Cloud Gate Day". Kapoor attended the celebration, while local jazz trumpeter and bandleader Orbert Davis and the Chicago Jazz Philharmonic played "Fanfare for Cloud Gate", which Davis composed. The public took an instant liking to the sculpture, affectionately referring to it as "The Bean". Cloud Gate has become a popular piece of public art and is now a fixture on many souvenirs such as postcards, sweatshirts, and posters. The sculpture has attracted a large number of locals, tourists, and art aficionados from around the world. The sculpture is now the piece by which Kapoor is most identified in the United States.

Time describes the piece as an essential photo opportunity, and more of a destination than a work of art. The New York Times writes that it is both a "tourist magnet" and an "extraordinary art object", while USA Today refers to the sculpture as a monumental abstract work. Chicago art critic Edward Lifson considers Cloud Gate to be among the greatest pieces of public art in the world. The American Welding Society recognized Cloud Gate, MTH Industries and PSI with the group's Extraordinary Welding Award. Time named Millennium Park one of the ten best architectural achievements of 2004, citing Cloud Gate as one of the park's major attractions.

What I wanted to do in Millennium Park is make something that would engage the Chicago skyline ... so that one will see the clouds kind of floating in, with those very tall buildings reflected in the work. And then, since it is in the form of a gate, the participant, the viewer, will be able to enter into this very deep chamber that does, in a way, the same thing to one's reflection as the exterior of the piece is doing to the reflection of the city around.

— Anish Kapoor

When the park first opened in 2004, Metra police stopped a Columbia College Chicago journalism student who was working on a photography project in Millennium Park and confiscated his film because of fears of terrorism. In 2005, the sculpture attracted some controversy when a professional photographer without a paid permit was denied access to the piece. As is the case for all works of art currently covered by United States copyright law, the artist holds the copyright for the sculpture. This allows the public to freely photograph Cloud Gate, but permission from Kapoor or the City of Chicago (which has licensed the art) is required for any commercial reproductions of the photographs. The city first set a policy of collecting permit fees for photographs. These permits were initially set at $350 per day for professional still photographers, $1,200 per day for professional videographers and $50 per hour for wedding photographers. The policy has been changed so permits are only required for large-scale film, video and photography requiring ten-person crews and equipment.

In addition to restricting photography of public art, closing a public park for a private event has also been controversial. In 2005 and 2006, almost all of Millennium Park was closed for a day for corporate events. On both occasions, as one of the park's primary attractions, Cloud Gate was the focus of controversy. On September 8, 2005, Toyota Motor Sales USA paid $800,000 to rent most venues in the park including Cloud Gate and the surrounding AT&T Plaza from 6 a.m. to 11 p.m. On August 7, 2006, Allstate paid $700,000 to rent the park. For this price, Allstate acquired the visitation rights to a different set of features and only had exclusive access to Cloud Gate after 4 p.m. These corporate closures denied tourists access to Kapoor's public sculpture, and commuters who walk through the park were forced to take alternative routes. City officials stated that the money would help finance free public programs in Millennium Park.

In 2015, a sculpture similar to Cloud Gate was reported in Karamay, China at the site of an oil discovery, which according to Eduardo Peñalver, the Dean of Cornell Law School, "very probably" is a copyright infringement against Cloud Gate. Though designed to resemble an oil bubble, Kapoor hoped that legal action would be taken against what he termed a Chinese knockoff. Mayor Rahm Emanuel was less concerned and said that it was a flattering imitation.

A movement to "Windex the Bean" was started in 2017, with the premise that the sculpture is dirty and needs to be cleaned. Posted as an event on Facebook, over 2000 people marked themselves as "going". The post also spawned a variety of similar joke movements.

== Artistic themes ==
=== Relevant Kapoor themes ===
I hope what I have done is make a serious work, which deals with serious questions about form, public space and an object in space. You can capture the popular imagination and hold other points of interest, but that is not what I set out to do, although there is inevitably a certain spectacular in an object like this.

— Anish Kapoor

Anish Kapoor has a reputation for creating spectacles in urban settings by producing works of extreme size and scale. Before creating Cloud Gate, Kapoor had created art that distorted images of the viewer instead of portraying images of its own. In doing so, he acquired experience blurring the boundary between the limit and the limitless. Kapoor drew on past experience to design Cloud Gate, in particular the designing of Sky Mirror (2001), a 20-foot (6.1 m) 10-short-ton (9 t; 9-long-ton) concave stainless steel mirror that also used a theme of distorted perception on a grand scale.

Kapoor's objects often aim to evoke immateriality and the spiritual, an outcome he achieves either by carving dark voids into stone pieces, or more recently, through the sheer shine and reflectivity of his objects. His works have no fixed identity, but rather occupy an illusionary space that is consistent with eastern theologies shared by Buddhism, Hinduism and Taoism, as well as Albert Einstein's views of a non-three-dimensional world. Kapoor explores the theme of ambiguity with his works that place the viewer in a state of "in-betweenness". The artist often questions and plays with such dualities as solidity–emptiness or reality–reflection, which in turn allude to such paired opposites as flesh–spirit, the here–the beyond, east–west, sky–earth, etc. that create the conflict between internal and external, superficial and subterranean, and conscious and unconscious. Kapoor also creates a tension between masculine and feminine within his art by having concave points of focus that invite the entry of visitors and multiplies their images when they are positioned correctly.

=== Cloud Gate themes ===
Kapoor often speaks of removing both the signature of the artist from his works as well as any traces of their fabrication, or what he refers to as "traces of the hand". He aspires to make his works look like they have independent realities that he reveals rather than creates. For him, removing all the seams from Cloud Gate was necessary in order to make the sculpture seem as though it was "perfect" and ready-made. These effects increase the viewer's fascination with it and makes them wonder what it is and where it came from. His attempts to hide his works' seams as an artist stand in contrast to Frank Gehry's architectural designs in the park, Jay Pritzker Pavilion and BP Pedestrian Bridge, which display their seams prominently.

Cloud Gate is described as a transformative, iconic work. It is similar to many of Kapoor's previous works in the themes and issues it addresses. While the sculpture's mirror effects are reminiscent of fun-house fairground mirrors, they also have a more serious intent; they help dematerialize this very large object, making it seem light and almost weightless. Cloud Gate is considered Kapoor's most ambitious use of complex mirrored form dynamics. Kapoor challenges his viewers to internalize his work through intellectual and theoretical exercise. By reflecting the sky, visiting and non-visiting pedestrians and surrounding architecture, Cloud Gate limits its viewers to partial comprehension at any time. The interaction with the viewer who moves to create his own vision gives it a spiritual dimension. The sculpture is described as a disembodied, luminous form, which is also how his earlier 1000 Names (1979–80) was described when it addressed the metaphysical and mystical.

The viewer physically enters the art when walking underneath into its "navel". The omphalos is a "warped dimension of fluid space". In this dimension, solid is transformed into fluid in a disorienting multiplicative manner that intensifies the experience. It is emblematic of Kapoor's work to deconstruct empirical space and venture into manifold possibilities of abstract space. The experience is described as a displaced or virtual depth that is composed of multiplied surfaces.

According to project manager Lou Cerny of MTH Industries, "When the light is right, you can't see where the sculpture ends and the sky begins." The sculpture challenges perception by distorting and deforming the surrounding architecture. The skyscrapers along East Randolph Street to the northeast (Two Prudential Plaza, and Aon Center), north (One Prudential Plaza) and northwest (The Heritage, Crain Communications Building) are reflected on Cloud Gate's surface when viewed from either the east or the west. The sculpture also warps viewers' perception of time by changing the speed of movements such as the passing of clouds.

Although in the conventional sense Cloud Gate is not an opening that leads anywhere in the same way that monumental gates do, it frames a view and is celebratory in the way it creates a ceremonial place. The work is credited with achieving a new level or understanding described as a transubstantiation of material, reminiscent of that which the artist experienced during a 1979 trip to India. Kapoor's 1000 Names evolved immediately after this trip; twenty-five years later he created Cloud Gate, an object that emerged from material forms to become immaterial.

Kapoor often relies on tenets of Hinduism in his art and says that "The experience of opposites allows for the expression of wholeness." Primal dualities that are one, such as the lingam and yoni, are important to Indian culture, and Cloud Gate represents both the male and female in one entity by symbolizing both the vagina and testicles. Thus, it represents the tension between the masculine and the feminine.

== In popular culture ==
The landmark has been used as a backdrop in commercial films, notably in the 2006 Hollywood film The Break-Up, which had to reshoot several scenes because the sculpture was under cover for the initial filming. It is also prominently featured in the ending scene of Source Code. Director Duncan Jones felt the structure was a metaphor for the movie's subject matter and aimed for it to be shown at the beginning and end of the movie. The sculpture served as an aesthetic and symbolic setting for the 2012 film The Vow when the lead characters share a kiss under it. It also appears in the video to "Homecoming", a song by Chicago native Kanye West, featuring Chris Martin of the band Coldplay. The sculpture is also featured in the 2008 mumblecore film Nights and Weekends. It was also featured in the Bollywood film Dhoom 3 and the 2014 movie Transformers: Age of Extinction, the fourth installment in the Transformers series. A modified reproduction of Cloud Gate is also included in Watch Dogs, a video game released in 2014 that takes place in Chicago. Unlike the real sculpture, the in-game replica is a curved, white torus. Cloud Gate also makes an appearance in season 7 episode 2 of Parks and Recreation "Ron & Jammy."

Cloud Gate plays a prominent role in Battle Ground, the 17th title in the Dresden Files urban fantasy novel series by Jim Butcher. In the Chicago of the novels, the sculpture was commissioned by Queen Mab, ruler of the Winter Court of Faerie, and proves to be hiding a large stockpile of armaments. Its placement by the Winter Court was in anticipation of a massive supernatural attack on the city of Chicago.

=== Lawsuit against National Rifle Association ===
A June 2017 video by the National Rifle Association (NRA) entitled The Clenched Fist of Truth used an image of Cloud Gate. Anish Kapoor sued the NRA to stop running the video, pay any profits gained as a result of the video, compensate him for statutory damages equivalent to $150,000 per infringement, and attorney fees. The suit was settled in December 2018 with the removal of the image from the NRA video.

=== Man in Bean protest ===
During the 2025 Lollapalooza festival, a group of protesters began calling for the release of a man who they satirically claimed was trapped inside of the Cloud Gate. According to the coalition, chief architect Anish Kapoor stole a baby and put him inside the sculpture during its construction, where he has remained since 2004. The posts on the protestors' social media accounts, which quickly gained tens of thousands of followers, urged the public to contact the alderman of Chicago's 42nd Ward, Brendan Reilly, to demand the man's release. Reilly's office received a large number of contacts regarding the group's claim, which they denied. The coalition responded by claiming that "Big Bean" was lying to the public. There is no evidence of a man living inside The Bean; it has been called a 'hoax' by many. The motive behind the group's action is unknown, although some have speculated that it may be performance art commenting on the state of journalism.

=== Border Patrol controversy ===
In November 2025, Block Club Chicago reported that dozens of U.S. Border Patrol agents had gathered to take pictures at Cloud Gate after earlier immigration raids in the Mexican-American neighborhood of Little Village. As they took pictures, one Border Patrol agent reportedly told others, "Everyone say, 'Little Village.'" Kapoor criticized the Border Patrol agents for taking pictures at the sculpture in comments to the art news publication Urgent Matter, in which he likened them to "Nazis" and condemned them for shouting "Little Village" as a "fascist battle cry."

=== "Push the Bean" event ===
On November 8th 2026 at 12:47pm, a numerous amount of people unsuccessfully attempted to push the sculpture seven inches to the north. About 250 people were in attendance. Local rapper Taylor Bennett participated, jokingly declaring victory with the false claim that the bean had been moved one inch.

== See also ==
- List of public art in Chicago
- Cloud Column (1998–2006), sculpture by the same artist
