= Lifson =

Lifson is a surname. Notable people with the surname include:

- Edward Lifson (fl. 1996–2010), American journalist, architecture critic, and academic
- Shneior Lifson (1914–2001), Israeli chemical physicist

== See also ==
- Lifson–Roig model
