= Scheps v Fine Art Logistic Ltd =

Contract-law case

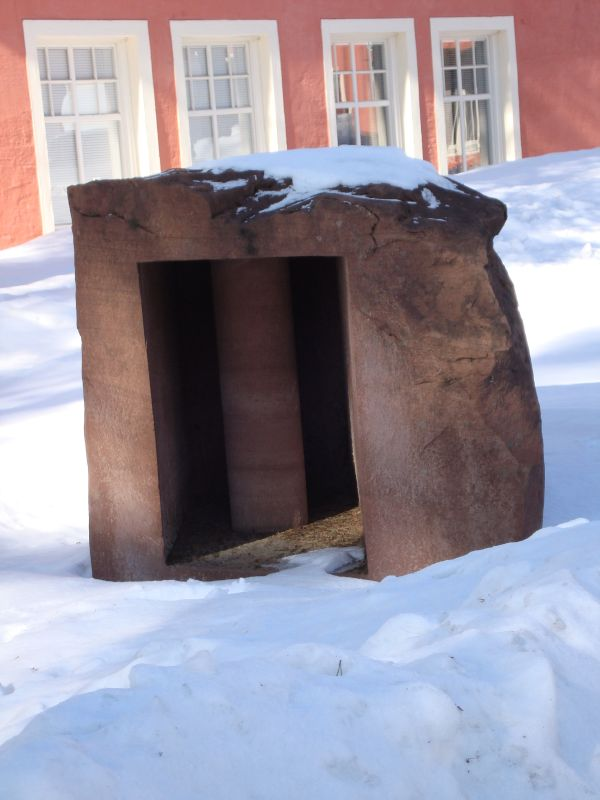
- An artwork by Kapoor (not disposed of)
- Court: High Court, Queen's Bench Division
- Citation: [2007] EWHC 541 (QB)
- Transcript: Full text of judgment

Court membership
- Judge sitting: Nigel Teare

Keywords
- incorporation of terms, common understanding

Scheps v Fine Art Logistic Ltd [2007] EWHC 541 (QB) is an English contract law case, concerning the incorporation of terms in a contract through a common understanding in an industry. It also raised a question about the Unfair Contract Terms Act 1977 and the Unfair Terms in Consumer Contracts Regulations 1999.

== Facts ==
For £20,000 art dealer Ofir Scheps purchased a sculpture by 1991 Turner Prize winner Anish Kapoor, called Hole and Vessel II from an auction house. Scheps hired Fine Art Logistics Ltd (FAL) to collect and store it until it could be delivered to Kapoor's studio for restoration. FAL did pick it up from the auction house, but lost it before it could be delivered to Kapoor; during renovation work at their storage house in Ponton Road, Wandsworth, London, it was probably mistakenly discarded. It was worth £350,000. FAL's standard terms limited liability to £350 per cubic metre of volume. FAL argued that Scheps must have been aware of such standard terms given his experience in arranging for art transport.

== Judgment ==
Judge Nigel Teare held there was no evidence that Scheps had knowledge of the terms of FAL or the business, and that FAL had not given a copy of the terms to Scheps, who was a private customer. Therefore the terms were not incorporated.

Under the Unfair Contract Terms Act 1977 and the Unfair Terms in Consumer Contracts Regulations 1999 it would be reasonable or fair for a company to limit its liability by weight or volume had the terms been reasonably brought to Scheps' attention. But no such effort was made. Therefore, Fine Art Logistics was liable for wrongful interference and conversion of the sculpture. Scheps was entitled to the value at the date of conversion and consequential damage to compensate for the rise in value after.

== See also ==
- British Crane Hire Corp Ltd v Ipswich Plant Hire Ltd [1975] QB 303
