= List of honorary fellows of St Peter's College, Oxford =

The Honorary Fellows of St Peter's College, Oxford include:

- Roger Angel
- Caroline Barron
- Graham Bell
- Sir Kenneth Bloomfield
- Richard Burton (actor)
- Dame Frances Cairncross
- Mark Carney
- Paul Condon, Baron Condon
- Mark Damazer
- Sir Lloyd Dorfman
- Sir Gordon Duff
- Sir David Eastwood
- Paul Fiddes
- Sir Charles Godfray
- Robin Hodgson, Baron Hodgson of Astley Abbotts
- Lord Houghton of Richmond
- Kurt Jackson
- Sir Robin Jacob
- Herwig Kogelnik
- Libby Lane
- Lang Lang
- Sir Anthony Mann
- Andrew Marr
- Sir David Moxon
- François Perrodo
- John Pritchard
- Admiral Sir Mark Stanhope
- Sir Nigel Teare
- Daniel Woolf
