= Gelsdorf =

Gelsdorf may refer to:

Places

- Gelsdorf, a village in the municipality of Grafschaft, Rhineland, in the state of Rhineland-Palatinate, Germany
- Gelsdorf, a hamlet in the municipality of Gransdorf, in the state of Rhineland-Palatinate, Germany

People

- Johann Joseph Gelsdorf (1859–1918), German builder
- Jürgen Gelsdorf (born 1953), German footballer
- Wilhelm Gelsdorf (1838–1908), glassmaker and businessman

== See also ==
- Geldof
