= The Void =

The Void may refer to:

== Art ==
- The Void (artwork), immaterial artwork by Yves Klein

== Fiction ==
=== Film and TV ===
- The Void (2001 film), a 2001 American film directed by Gilbert M. Shilton
- The Void (2016 film), a 2016 Canadian horror film
- "The Void", an episode of the American animated TV series Sonic the Hedgehog
- "The Void" (Star Trek: Voyager), a 2001 episode of the American TV series
- "The Void", a 2014 episode of Lego Ninjago: Masters of Spinjitzu
- "The Void", a 2014 episode of The Amazing World of Gumball
- The Void, a 2021 British game show
- The Void (Marvel Cinematic Universe location), a dimension in the Marvel Cinematic Universe
- The Void (Marvel Cinematic Universe character), a malevolant alter-ego of the hero, Sentry

=== Literature ===
- The Void (Middle-earth), an uninhabited region of nothingness in J. R. R. Tolkien's cosmology
- Location in the Void Trilogy series of books by British author Peter F. Hamilton

=== Video games ===
- The Void (video game), a 2008 adventure computer game by Ice-Pick Lodge
- The Void (virtual reality), a virtual-reality business

== Music ==
- Former artist's name of Oumi Kapila

=== Albums ===
- The Void album by Weesp (band)

=== Songs ===
- "The Void", song by Cage
- "The Void", song from One Fast Move or I'm Gone
- "The Void", song by Andy Black from The Shadow Side
- "The Void", song by Cypecore from their album Identity
- "The Void", song by Kid Cudi from Man on the Moon III
- "The Void", song by Martha from Love Keeps Kicking
- "The Void", song by MC Vinnie Paz with Buckwild and Eamon from album Cornerstone of the Corner Store
- "The Void", song by Meat Puppets from Monsters
- "The Void", song by Metric from Synthetica
- "The Void", song by Mike Gordon from Moss
- "The Void", song by Muse from Simulation Theory
- "The Void", song by Nick Oliveri from Leave Me Alone
- "The Void", song by Parkway Drive from their album Reverence
- "The Void", song by The Raincoats from their 1979 self-titled album
- "The Void", song by Swallow the Sun from Moonflowers
- "The Void", song by Whitechapel from Mark of the Blade

== Other uses ==
- The Void (philosophy)

== See also ==
- The Void in art and media
- Void (disambiguation)
