= Temenos (Kapoor) =

Public artwork in Middlesbrough, England

Coordinates: 54.5803°N 1.2216°W

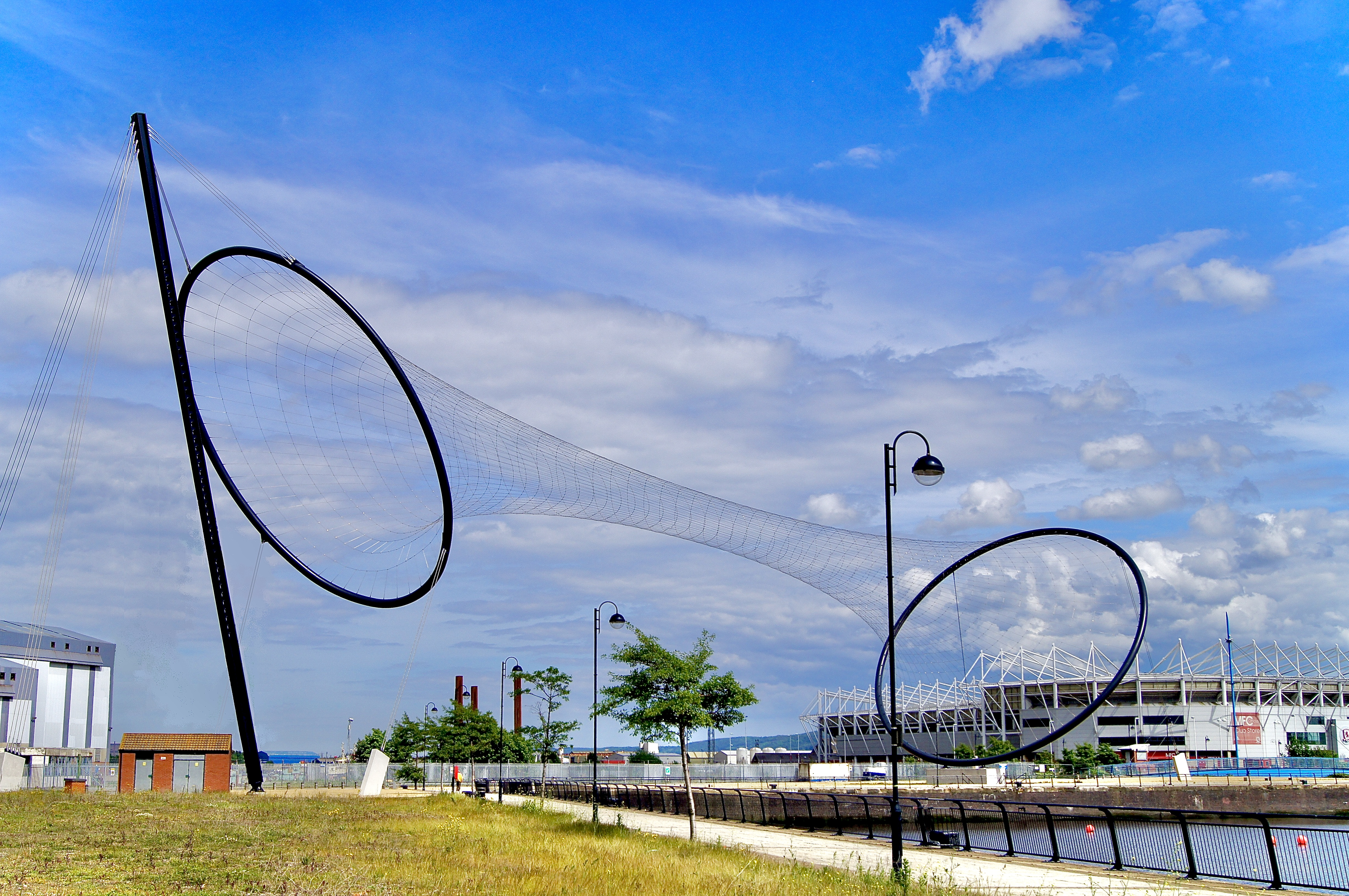
Temenos viewed from the north-west, with the Riverside Stadium in the background.

Temenos is a sculpture in Middlesbrough, Northern England. It is approximately 110 metres (360 ft) long and 50 metres (160 ft) high and cost £2.7 million. The steel structure consists of a pole, a circular ring and an oval ring, all held together by steel wire.

The name Temenos comes from the Ancient Greek (τέμενος < τέμνω, temno, 'to cut') term for land cut off and assigned as an official domain, especially to kings and chiefs, or a piece of land marked off from common uses and dedicated to a god, a sanctuary, holy grove or holy precinct.

The structure is in the Middlehaven area of Middlesbrough, close to where the Transporter bridge is located; construction work started in autumn 2008 and was completed by spring 2010, and the sculpture was officially presented to the people of Middlesbrough on 10 June 2010. It was funded by the Government Initiative, The Northern Way, the regional development agency One NorthEast, the Arts Council England, the Northern Rock Foundation, Middlesbrough Football Club and BioRegional Quintain.

== History ==
The sculpture was part of the planned Tees Valley Giants, intended as a £15 million series of five art installations by the sculptor Anish Kapoor and the structural designer Cecil Balmond. The artwork was planned to be created in the towns of Darlington, Hartlepool, Middlesbrough, Redcar and Stockton on Tees, all in the Tees Valley. The project was launched in July 2008 by Tees Valley Regeneration. If completed, the project would become the world's biggest public art project. In September 2012, Kapoor insisted that the other projects would go ahead, but by September 2016 no progress had been announced.

The other four structures were never formally announced, and in June 2012 the BBC revealed that plans for them had been put on hold; it currently seems unlikely that funding for them will be secured. In September 2012, Kapoor insisted that all of the structures would go ahead, but the project then slipped out of the news until May 2018 when Stockton Council was hoping to revive the scheme by seeking funding from Tees Valley Combined Authority for a second sculpture.
