= Void =

Void may refer to:

== Science, engineering, and technology ==
- Void (astronomy), the spaces between galaxy filaments that contain no galaxies
- Void (composites), a pore that remains unoccupied in a composite material
- Void, synonym for vacuum, a space containing no matter
- Void, a bubble within a mechanical part that causes cavitation when it collapses
- Void, an unwanted air pocket formed during injection moulding
- VoID or Vocabulary of Interlinked Datasets, an RDF vocabulary to enable the discovery and use of linked data sets
- Void Linux, a Linux distribution
- void, the void type, a possible return value in some programming languages

== Arts, entertainment, and media ==
=== Characters ===
- Void, a malevolent alter ego of superhero Sentry (Robert Reynolds)
- Void (Wildcats), member of the original team
- Void, the main antagonist in the 2000 video game Sonic Shuffle
- Voids, the villains in the Zbots action-figures franchise
- Void Termina, Void Soul, and Void, the overarching villain(s) in Kirby Star Allies
- Void, a member of the God Hand and one of the main villains in Berserk
- Void, the main antagonist of Chapter 13 in Xenoblade Chronicles X: Definitive Edition
- Void Kong, the central antagonist of Donkey Kong Bananza

=== Films ===
- Void (film), a 2013 Lebanese film

=== Literature ===
- A Void, a 1969 French novel written without using the letter e by Georges Perec
- Void Trilogy, a science-fiction series by Peter F. Hamilton

=== Music ===
- Void (band), a Washington, D.C.–based hardcore punk band
- Void (Intronaut album), 2006
- VOID (NaNa album), 1999
- Void (Vanna album), 2014
- Void (War of Ages album), 2019
- VOID (Video Overview in Deceleration), a 2005 DVD by the Flaming Lips
- ØØ Void, a 2000 album by Sunn O)))
- Voids (album), a 2017 album by Minus the Bear
- Void (EP), an EP by Destroy the Runner
- Void, a 2025 EP by Molotov Solution
- Voids, a compilation album by Have a Nice Life
- "Void", a song by Allday from Drinking with My Smoking Friends
- "Void", a song by Denzel Curry from 32 Zel/Planet Shrooms
- "Void", a song by Kilo Kish
- "Void", a song by Lil Nas X from Montero
- "Void" (song), a song by Melanie Martinez from Portals
- “Void”, a song by Red House Painters from Old Ramon
- "Void", a song by the Neighborhood from The Neighbourhood

=== Other arts, entertainment, and media ===
- Void (cards), to have no cards of a particular suit in one's hand during a card game
- Void (fanzine), a major science-fiction fanzine started in the 1950s
- Void Gallery, a contemporary art gallery in Derry, Northern Ireland

== Religion and philosophy ==
- The Void (philosophy)
- Void, English for Kū, one of the five elements in Japanese Buddhism
- Śūnyatā, a Buddhist philosophical concept translated most often as emptiness and sometimes voidness

== Other uses ==
- Void (law), an action, document or transaction that has no legal effect
- Voiding, or to void the bladder, the act of urination
- Nothing

== See also ==
- The Void (disambiguation)
