= Current Issues in Comparative Education =

- Discipline: Education
- Language: English

Publication details
- History: 1997-present
- Publisher: Teachers College, Columbia University (United States)
- Frequency: Biannual

Standard abbreviations
- ISO 4: Curr. Issues Comp. Educ.

Indexing
- ISSN: 1523-1615

Links
- Journal homepage

Current Issues in Comparative Education is an international online, open-access academic journal publishing diverse opinions of academics, practitioners, and students in the field of comparative and international education. The journal shares its home with the oldest program in comparative education in the US, the Teachers College Comparative and International Education Program, founded in 1898. Established in March 1997 by a group of doctoral students from Teachers College, Columbia University, the journal is dedicated to serve as a platform for debate and discussion of contemporary educational matters worldwide.
