= The Void in art and media =

Representation or portrayals of the notion of The Void can be found in popular culture: including visual art, performance art, music, literature and film and video games.

In 2011, the Tate Museum in London presented an exhibition titled, Nothing Works: The Void, examining works that spanned over a century, including early 20th century works such as a 1918 work by the painter Kasimir Malevich, and a 1919 work by Marcel Duchamp, mid-century works by conceptual artist, Michael Asher, as well as late 20th century and early 21st-century contemporary artworks. In 2013, the Museum of Contemporary Art, Chicago hosted the exhibition, Destroy the Picture: Painting The Void, 1949-1962, featuring paintings that represented or referred to "the void." The exhibition included the work of 100 artists; the curatorial premise defined the concept of the void as "one of the most significant developments in contemporary abstract painting." The curators posit that artists were attracted to the subject as a result of an existential crisis after the use of the first atomic weapons in Japan during WWII. In 2020, the Museum of Modern Art, New York further developed the theme in the exhibition, Touching the Void, curated with works from the museum's permanent collection that explored "meditative possibilities of objectivity, challenging viewers to heighten their sensory perception."

== Art ==
- Marina Abramović, Holding emptiness (2012).
- Lee Bontecou, Into the Void: Prints of Lee Bontecou exhibition held at the Art Institute of Chicago.
- Alberto Giacometti, Hands Holding the Void (Invisible Object) (1934).
- Anish Kapoor, has stated that, “That’s what I am interested in: the void, the moment when it isn’t a hole. It is a space full of what isn’t there.”
- Yves Klein, Le Vide (The Void) (1958) and "Leap Into the Void" (1960).
- Lee Ufan, Marking Infinity (2011).

== Music ==
- Steve Roach, The Magnificent Void (1996).
- The Beatles, "Tomorrow Never Knows" (1966).
- Hole, The Void (1995)
- Nine Inch Nails, "Into the Void" (1999).
- Palaye Royale, "Love the Void" (2018).

== Literature ==
- Albert Camus and absurdism.
- Mishima ou la vision du vide (Mishima: A Vision of the Void), an essay by Marguerite Yourcenar about the life and body of work of Yukio Mishima. Translated by Alberto Manguel in 2001 ISBN 0-226-96532-5)

== Video games ==
- The Void, released in 2008
- The Dishonored franchise.
- EverQuest contains a zone called "The Void".
- Hollow Knight by Team Cherry, with Void being one of the main elements.
- Dark Souls contains an analogous concept known as "the Abyss."
- Rain World contains an acidic sea called "The Void Sea" which is capable of halting reincarnation
- Risk of Rain 2 has a realm called The Void and several enemies and locations therein.

== Films ==
- 2001: A Space Odyssey, a 1968 Science-fiction mystery film directed by Stanley Kubrick.
- Altered States, a 1980 American science-fiction horror film directed by Ken Russell.
- Crimes and Misdemeanors, a 1989 American existential comedy-drama film written and directed by Woody Allen.
- Nothing, a 2003 Canadian philosophical comedy-drama film directed by Vincenzo Natali.
- Beyond the Black Rainbow, a 2010 Canadian science fiction horror film written and directed by Panos Cosmatos.
- The Void, a 2016 Canadian Lovecraftian horror film written and directed by Steven Kostanski and Jeremy Gillespie.
