= Sky Mirror =

Series of mirror sculptures by Anish Kapoor

Coordinates: 52.9540°N 1.1565°W

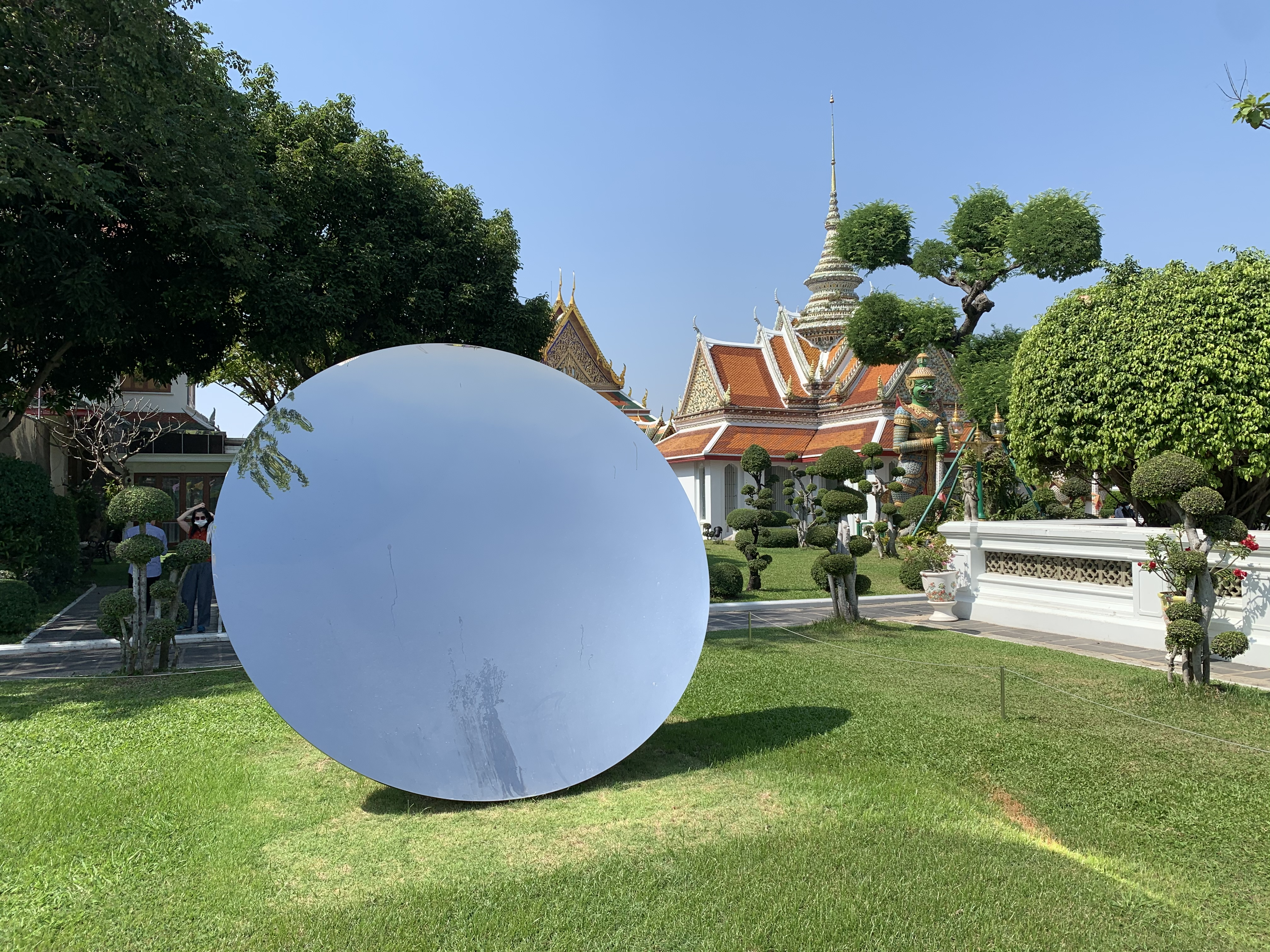
Sky Mirror, this one commissioned in 2015, on a temporary exhibition in 2020 at Wat Arun, Bangkok

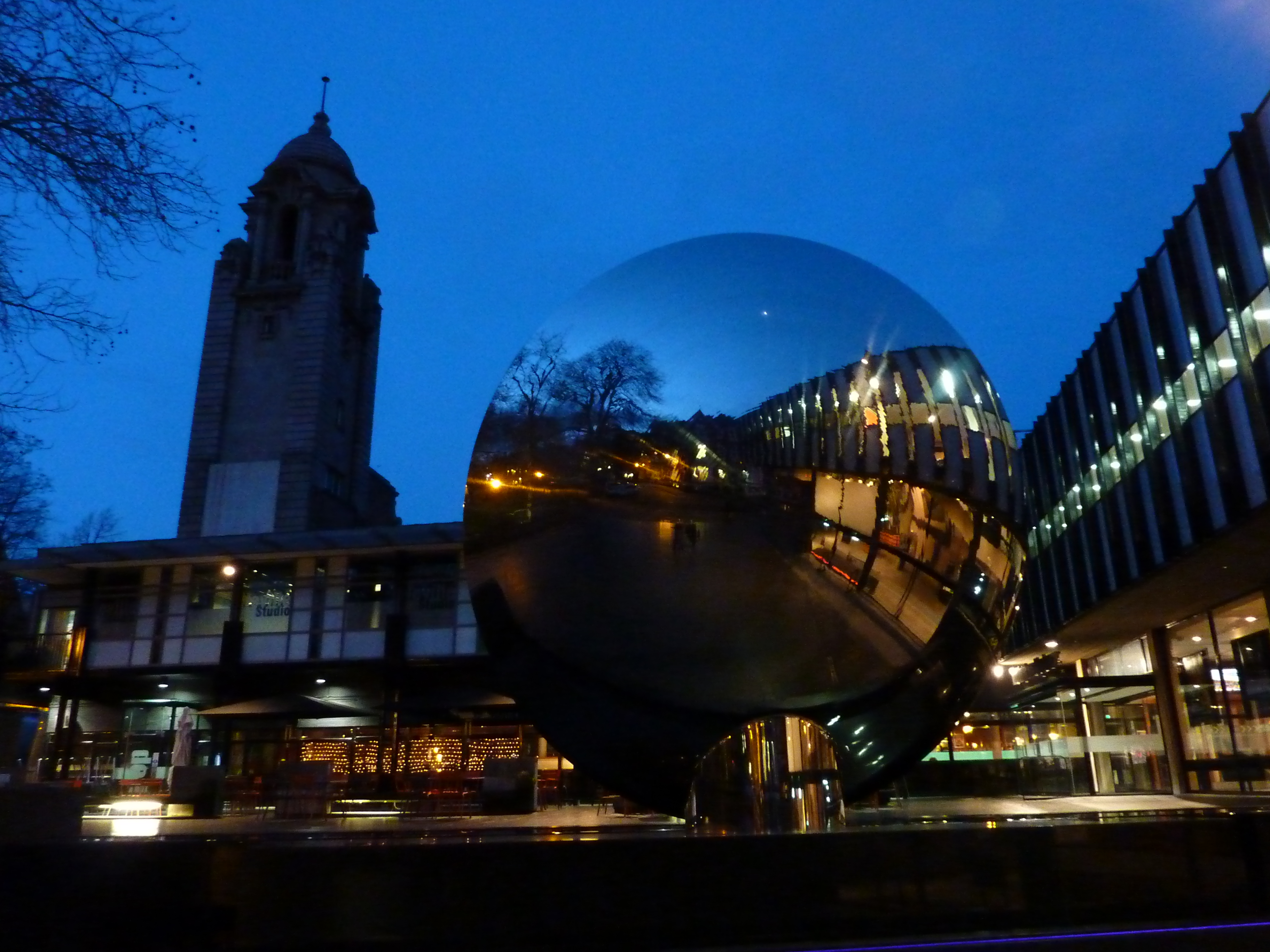
The original Sky Mirror in Wellington Circus, Nottingham, outside the Nottingham Playhouse theatre.

Sky Mirror is a public sculpture by artist Anish Kapoor. Commissioned by the Nottingham Playhouse, it is installed outside the theatre in Wellington Circus, Nottingham, England. Sky Mirror is a 6-metre-wide (20 ft)-wide concave dish of polished stainless steel weighing 10 tonnes (9.8 long tons) and angled up towards the sky. Its surface reflects the ever-changing environment.

== Original version ==
It took six years from the initial idea for a major new piece of public art to the unveiling of Sky Mirror on 27 April 2001, and cost £921,000 (equivalent to £1,655,000 in 2023). At the time, it was the largest National Lottery grant to any single artwork. It was manufactured in Finland.

In autumn 2007 the Nottingham Playhouse Sky Mirror was voted Pride of Place in a poll to find Nottingham's favourite landmark. In 2009, Sky Mirror was installed in Brighton's Pavilion Gardens for the Brighton Festival.

From 28 September 2010, Sky Mirror and three other Kapoor sculptures were exhibited in Kensington Gardens, London. The open-air exhibition was titled Turning the World Upside Down and it ran until 13 March 2011. It was accessible from 6 a.m. until dusk. Kapoor said that Kensington Gardens was "the best site in London for a piece of art, probably in the world". The location of Sky Mirror was previously occupied by a sculpture by Henry Moore – a work that was donated by the artist, but had been removed for conservation in 1996. Kapoor's sculptures were guarded round-the-clock at a cost estimated to be £120,000 paid for by the Royal Parks Agency.

== Other versions ==
From 20 September to 27 October 2006, a larger version of Sky Mirror was installed at Rockefeller Center in New York City. It had a 35 foot (11 m) diameter, stood three stories tall, and weighed 23 long tons (23 t). The convex side faced Fifth Avenue, the concave side the Rockefeller Center courtyard.

Versions of Sky Mirror also exist in the Hermitage Museum in Saint Petersburg, Russia, in front of the Casino de Monte-Carlo in Monaco, and in the Serralves Museum in Porto, Portugal. The De Pont Museum of Contemporary Art in Tilburg, the Netherlands has a rectangular (650 cm by 250 cm) version. There is a version at the Dallas Cowboys Art Collection at AT&T Stadium. Singapore's Marina Bay Sands has a 2.9-metre-wide (9.5 ft)-wide version. A 5-metre-wide (16 ft)-wide version was exhibited at Houghton Hall in 2020.

== Gallery ==
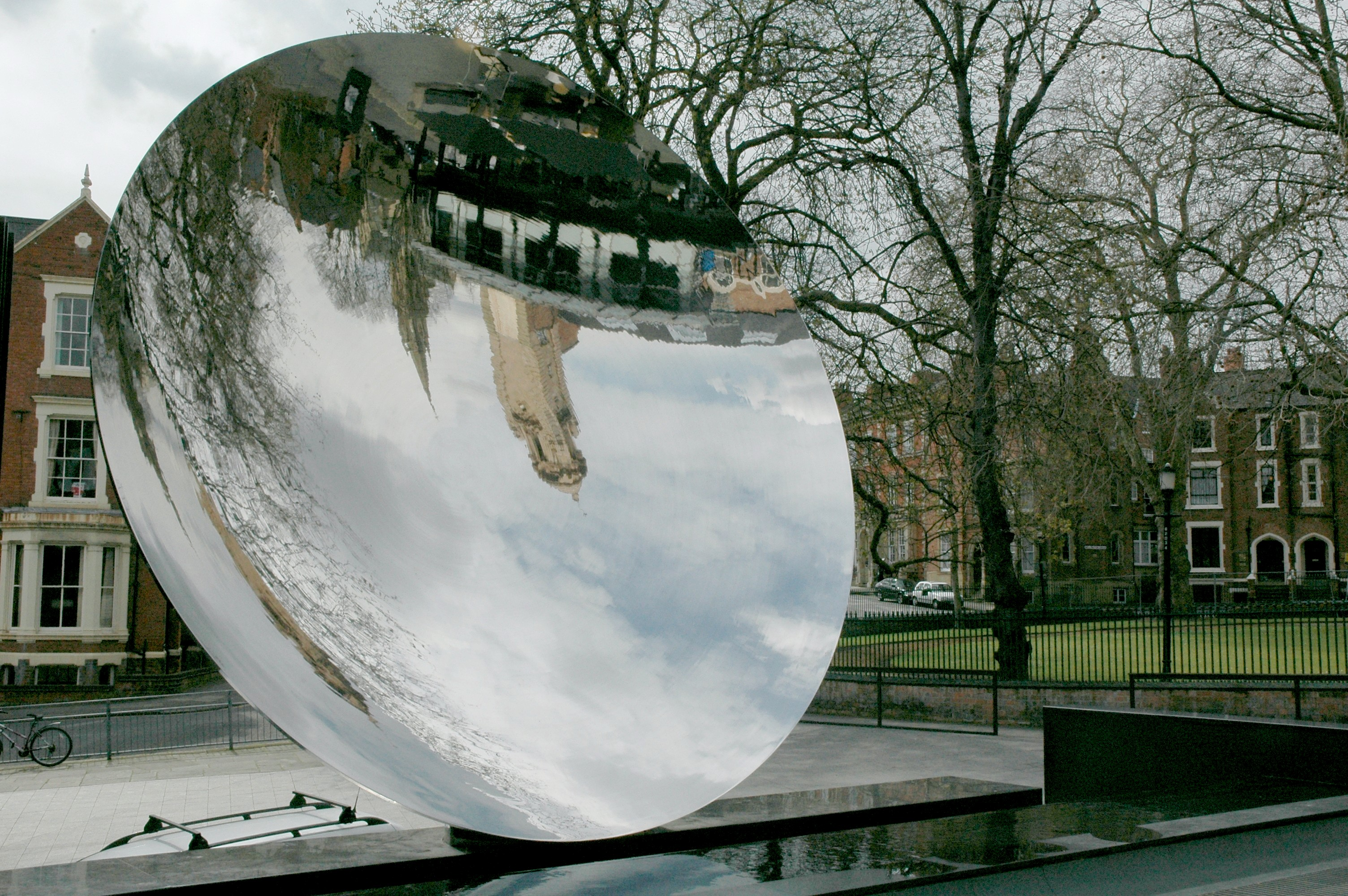
Sky Mirror (original), Nottingham

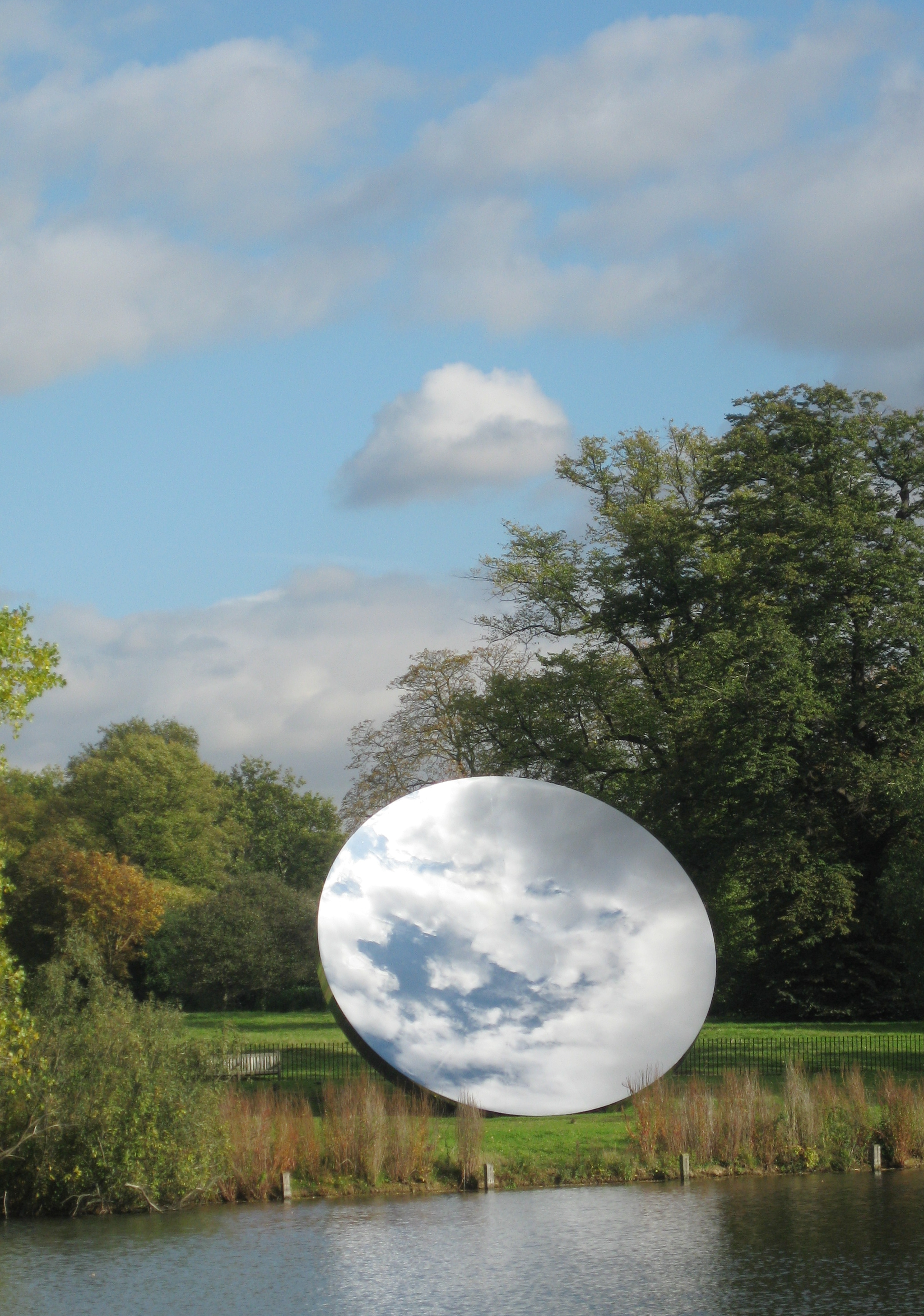
Sky Mirror (original), Kensington Gardens, London

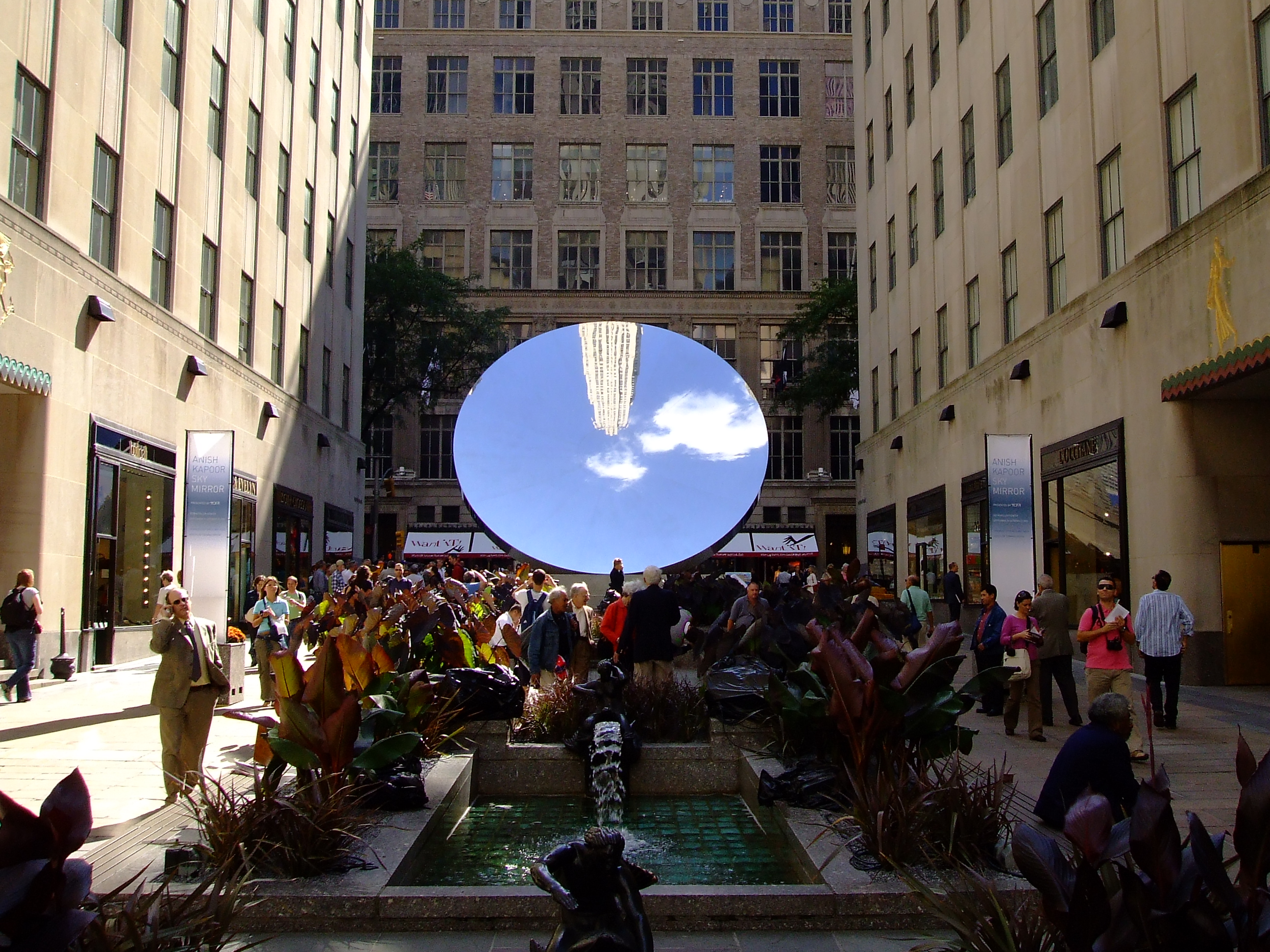
Sky Mirror (version), New York, as seen from Rockefeller Center

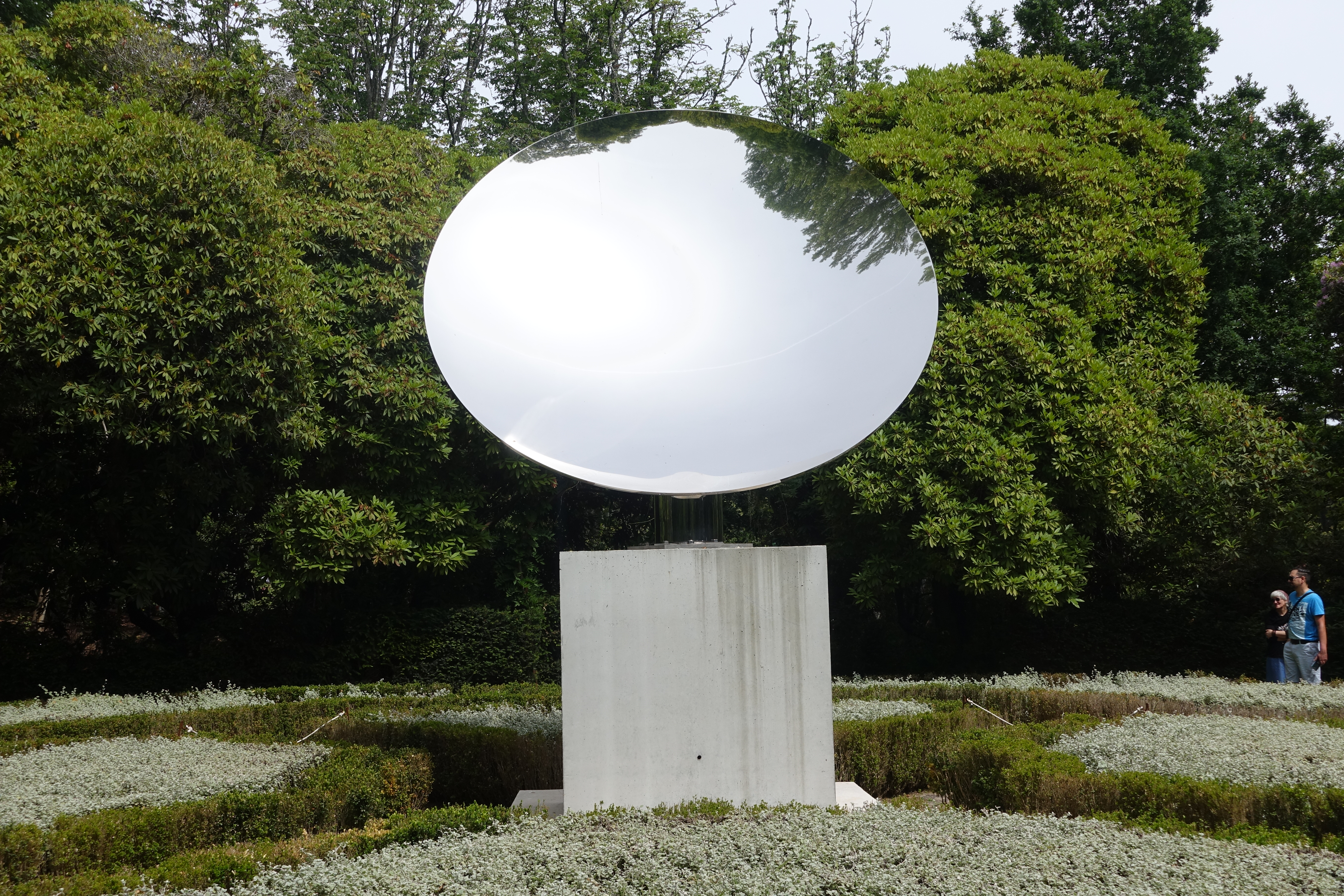
Sky Mirror (version), Serralves, Porto, Portugal
