= Nigel Teare =

British High Court judge (born 1952)

Sir Nigel Teare
- Royal coat of arms of the United Kingdom

Justice of the High Court
- In office 2006–2020

Personal details
- Born: 8 January 1952 (age 74)
- Spouse: Elizabeth Pentecost (m. 1975)
- Education: St Peter's College, Oxford
- Occupation: Judge
- Profession: Barrister

Sir Nigel John Martin Teare (born 8 January 1952), is a retired judge of the High Court of England and Wales. He was Admiralty Judge and Judge in charge of the Commercial Court.

== Early life and education ==
He was born to Eric and Mary Teare. He was educated at King William's College. From there, he studied at St Peter's College, Oxford. He received a BA in 1973 and an MA in 1975. He was later elected an Honorary Fellow at the College in 2010.

== Career ==
He was called to the bar at Lincoln's Inn in 1974. He was made a QC in 1991, recorder from 1997 to 2006. He was made a judge of the High Court of Justice (Queen's Bench Division) since 2006. In 2006, he received the customary knighthood. In 2011 he was appointed the Admiralty Judge, in charge of the Admiralty Court and judge in charge of the Commercial Court list from October 2017. Between 2013 and 2016, he was Presiding Judge of the Western Circuit.

In 2009, Teare presided over the "extraordinary case" of fraud and embezzlement amounting to $6 billion by Mukhtar Ablyazov; the largest case of financial fraud in history.

In 2004, he was made a Bencher of Lincoln's Inn.

He retired on October 1, 2020.

== Personal life ==
He married Elizabeth Pentecost in 1975; they have two sons and a daughter.
