= Geldof =

Geldof is a surname. Notable people with the surname include:

- Bob Geldof (born 1951), Irish singer, songwriter, author, and political activist
- Peaches Geldof (1989–2014), British model and presenter and journalist, daughter of Bob Geldof
- Pixie Geldof (born 1990), British model and singer, daughter of Bob Geldof

== See also ==
- Geldoff, a fictional character in Marvel Comics
- Gandalf
- Gandolf
