= Edward Lifson =

American journalist and academic

Edward Lifson is an American journalist, architecture critic, and academic. He was the Director of Communications for the Pritzker Architecture Prize. He was also a domestic, foreign and war correspondent and bureau chief for NPR National Public Radio; and he created and hosted a radio show in Chicago called "Hello Beautiful!" to explore and tell stories of urban issues, architecture and design. Lifson is an Adjunct Instructor in the Media Center at the USC Annenberg School for Communication and Journalism. For NPR, in the U.S. Lifson covered urban affairs, politics, economics, labor and arts and culture. In 1996, he established the National Public Radio Bureau in Berlin, Germany. In Europe, he covered the rebuilding of Berlin as a city and a national capital, European Union, post-Cold War politics, NATO, the launch of the euro, immigration issues, and Central Europe’s transition to democracy and capitalism. As a war correspondent, he reported extensively for NPR from Serbia, Kosovo, Montenegro and Macedonia before and during the war in Kosovo. In addition to Berlin, he has lived for many years in Paris, Florence, Italy and in England. Lifson was the interim Director of the Shanghai-based American Academy in China, an urban design think tank and studio.

He advises architect selection committees and works with architects and firms on strategy and communications.

Lifson's work has been heard on the BBC, CNN, and CBC, and seen in Dwell, The Architect's Newspaper, Architect, Metropolis, Wallpaper*, and A+U.

His journalism often focuses on what makes cities work and how they can be improved. His particular interests include public space, transportation and art; street furniture, landscaping, parks, civic buildings, sustainability, housing, historic preservation, China, modern architecture and Japanese architecture.

He created and hosted "Hello Beautiful!"—the popular award-winning weekly radio program about arts, architecture and culture—on Chicago Public Radio until mid-2007.

A report by Lifson on the impending auction of Mies van der Rohe's modernist masterpiece Farnsworth House on the Fox River in Plano, Illinois, inspired people across America to donate money to preserve the house in its original location.

In 2007 he was a fellow in the USC/Annenberg Getty Arts Journalism Fellowship in Los Angeles and later became the Associate Director of the program.

In 2007/8 he was a Loeb Fellow at the Graduate School of Design at Harvard University, where he studied urban planning and design, history and theory of architecture, landscape architecture and sustainability. In 2008/9 he was an Annenberg Fellow in Los Angeles at the University of Southern California to study the Specialized Journalism of Architecture.

In 2009/10 he was a visiting fellow at the Graduate School of Design at Harvard University, involved in urban planning and design, history and theory of architecture, landscape architecture and sustainability.

He conducted the last interview with the American writer, oral historian, actor and radio host Studs Terkel.
