= Weave =

Weave may refer to:

- Weaving, is a process of interlacing yarns to form a fabric.

== Arts and entertainment ==
- Weave (Forgotten Realms), a mechanism for using magic in Dungeons & Dragons fantasy games
  - Shadow Weave, a force of magic that is the inverse and opposite of the Weave
- Weave Magazine, an American literary magazine based in Pittsburgh
- Big Daddy Weave, a contemporary Christian band composed of Mike Weaver (lead singer), Jay Weaver, Jeremy Redmon, Joe Shirk, and Brian Beihl
- Weave and Spin, the first album by folk trio Lady Maisery

== Science and technology ==
- Weave (digital printing), a digital printing technique
- WEAVE, a secondary program of WEB
- Weave (protocol), an internet of things communication protocol
- Mozilla Weave, a browser synchronization feature
- Weave merge, a merging algorithm

== Other uses ==
- Weave (consultancy), a French company which provides operational strategy consulting services
- Hair weave, an artificial hair integration
- Bob and weave, a boxing maneuver
- Weave Bridge, a bridge at The University of Pennsylvania, US
- Thach Weave, an aerial combat tactic developed by naval aviator John S. Thach
- Unweave the Weave, a road construction project of the Minnesota Department of Transportation
- Weave of events, a number of actions and their effects that are contiguous and linked together that results in a particular outcome
- Weave poles, in the sport of dog agility

== See also ==
- "we've", a commonly used contraction of "we have"
- weev (born 1985), internet troll
- Dreamweaver (disambiguation)
