= ArcelorMittal Orbit =

Sculpture and tower in London, England

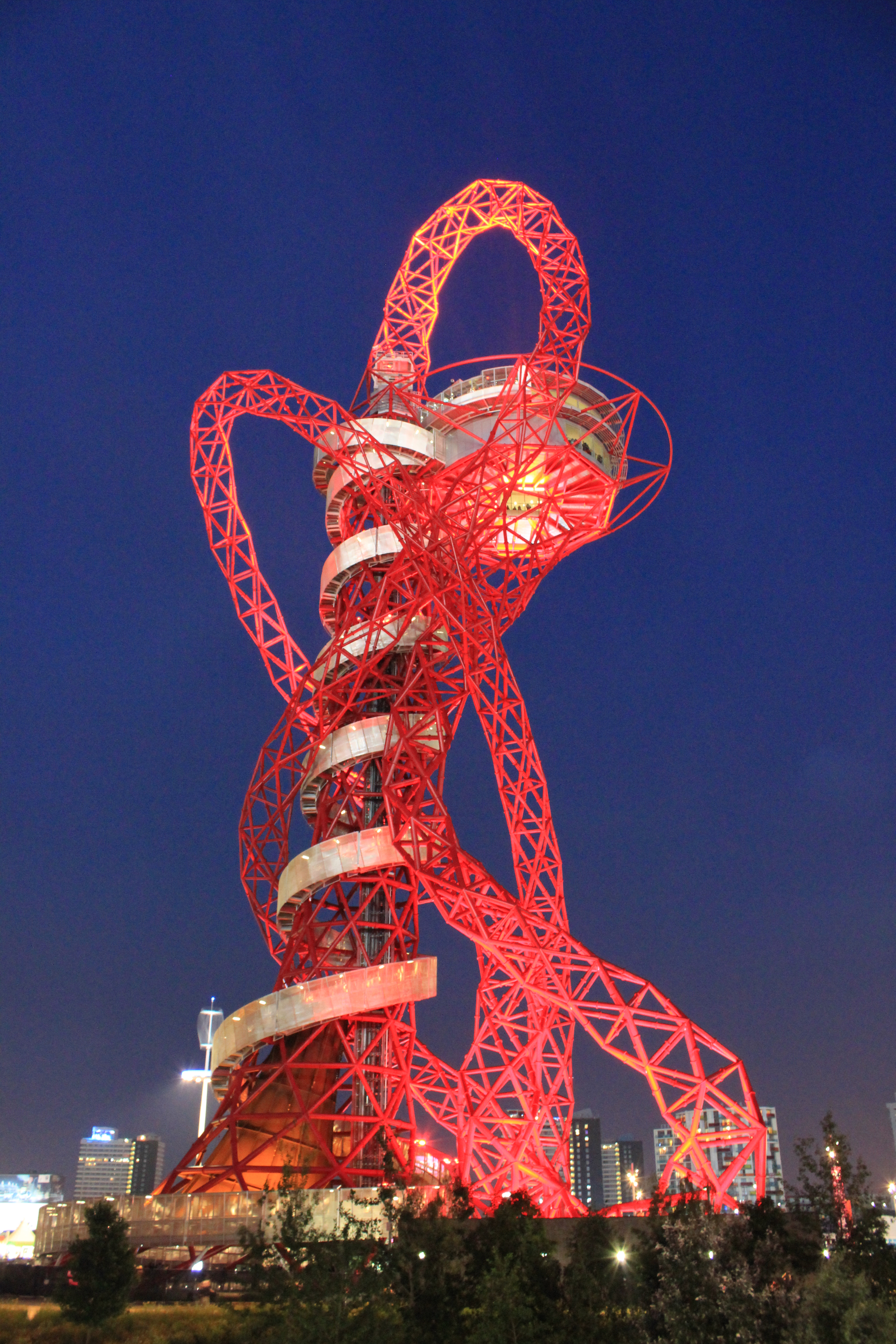

General information
- Type: Observation tower
- Location: Queen Elizabeth Olympic Park; London, E20; United Kingdom
- Coordinates: 51°32′18″N 0°0′48″W
- Estimated completion: May 2012
- Opened: April 2014; 12 years ago
- Cost: £22.7 million
- Owner: Olympic Park Legacy Company (on completion), ownership transferred to London Legacy Development Corporation
- Operator: ENGIE Services Limited on behalf of London Legacy Development Corporation

Height
- Height: 114.5 m (376 ft)

Technical details
- Floor area: 300 m^{2} (3,229 ft^{2})

Design and construction
- Architects: Designed by Anish Kapoor with Sir Cecil Balmond of Arup Group, architect Ushida Findlay Architects
- Developer: ArcelorMittal and London Development Agency
- Structural engineer: Arup

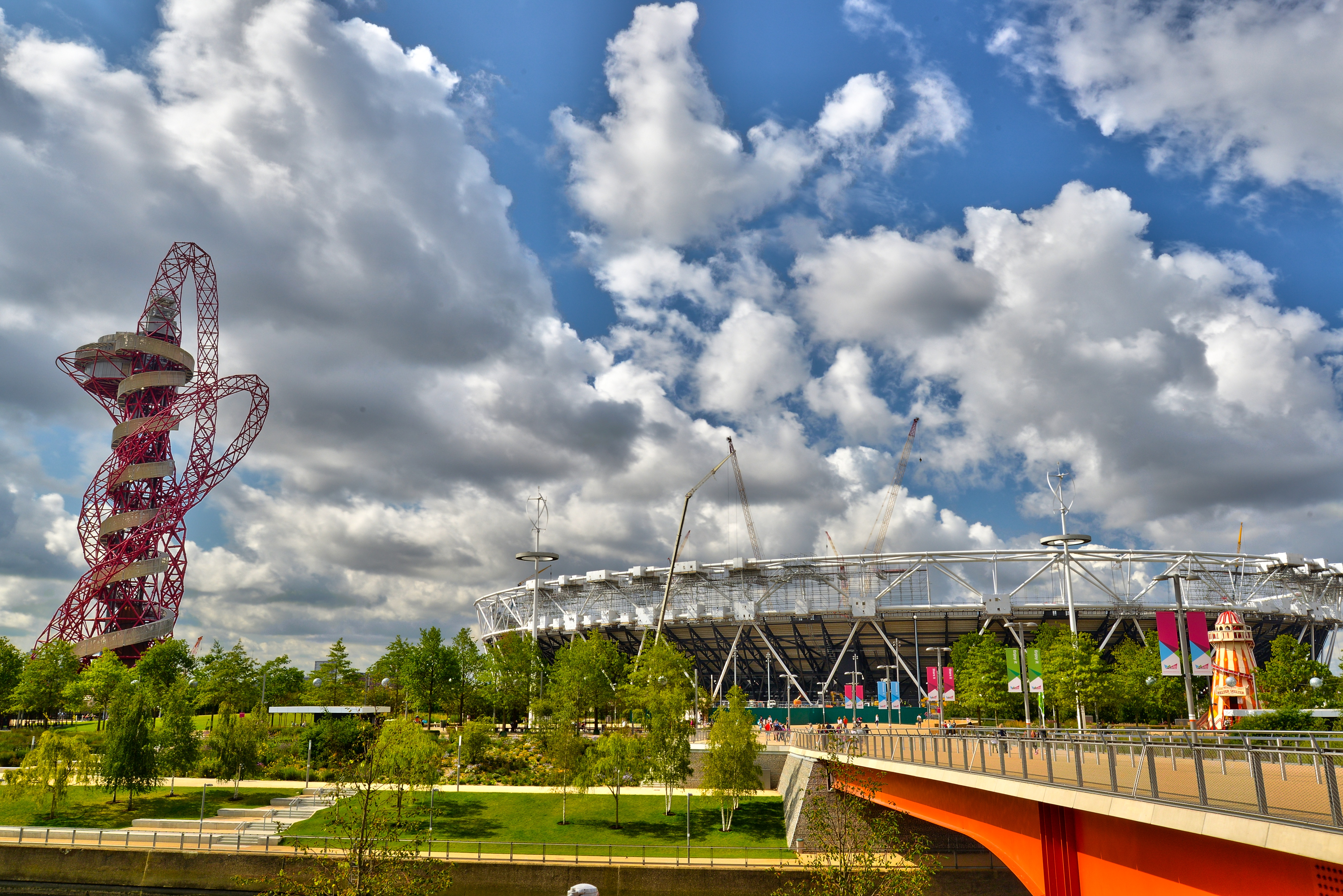
Arcelormittal Orbit and London Stadium

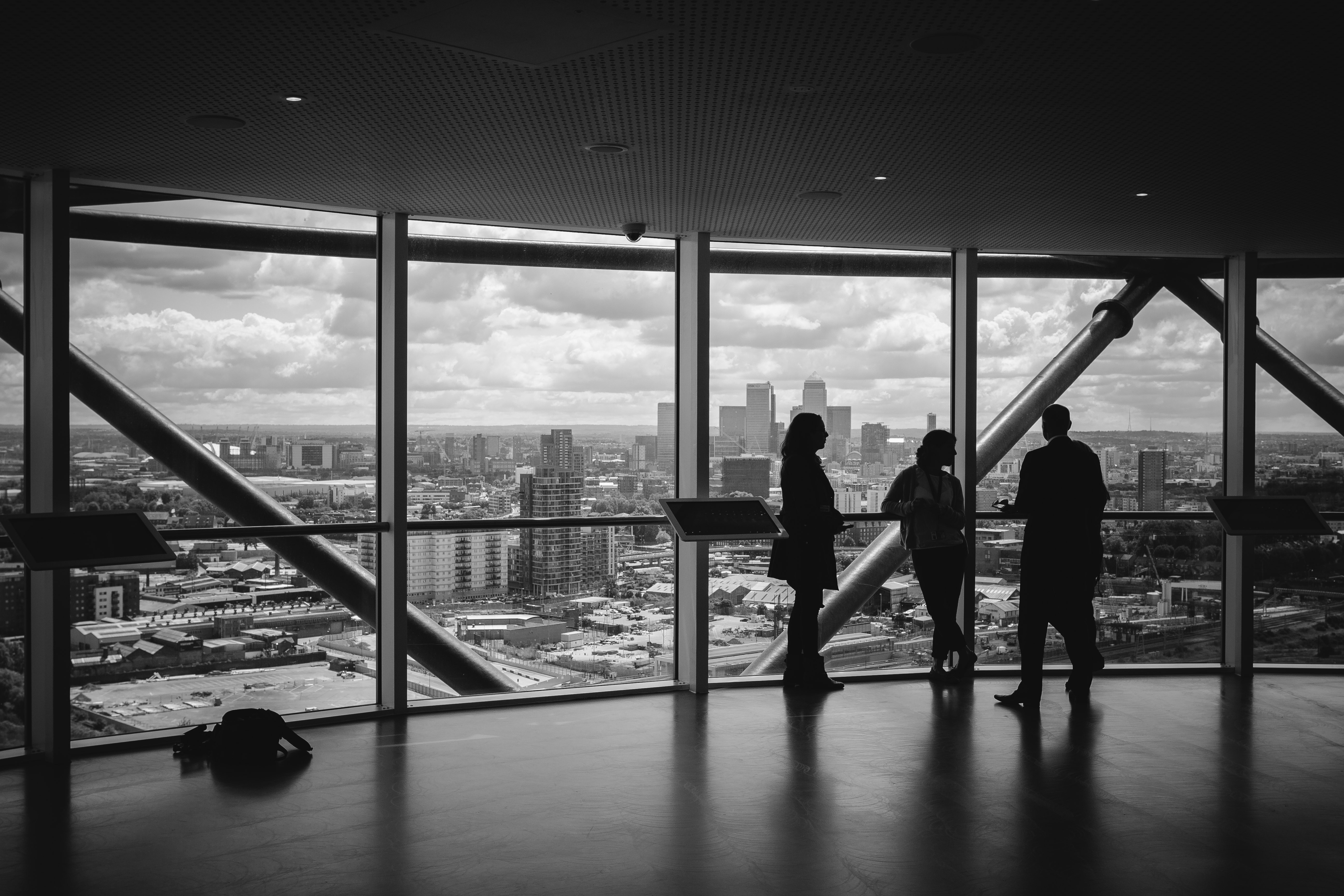
View from the ArcelorMittal Orbit

The ArcelorMittal Orbit (often referred to as the Orbit Tower or its original name, Orbit) is a 114.5-metre (376-foot) sculpture and observation tower in Queen Elizabeth Olympic Park in Stratford, London. It is Britain's largest piece of public art, and is intended to be a permanent lasting legacy of London's hosting of the 2012 Summer Olympic and Paralympic Games, assisting in the post-Olympics regeneration of the Stratford area. Sited between London Stadium (formerly called the Olympic Stadium) and the Aquatics Centre, it allows visitors to view the whole Olympic Park from two observation platforms.

Orbit was designed by Turner Prize–winning artist Anish Kapoor and Cecil Balmond of Arup Group, an engineering firm. Announced on 31 March 2010, it was expected to be completed by December 2011. The project came about after Mayor of London Boris Johnson and Olympics Minister Tessa Jowell decided in 2008 that the Olympic Park needed "something extra". Designers were asked for ideas for an "Olympic tower" at least 100 metres (330 ft) high: Orbit was the unanimous choice from proposals considered by a nine-person advisory panel. Kapoor and Balmond believed that Orbit represented a radical advance in the architectural field of combining sculpture and structural engineering, and that it combined both stability and instability in a work that visitors can engage with and experience via an incorporated spiral walkway. It has been both praised and criticised for its bold design, and has especially received criticism as a vanity project of questionable lasting use or merit as a public art project.

The project was expected to cost £19.1 million, with £16 million coming from Britain's then-richest man, the steel tycoon Lakshmi Mittal, Chairman of the ArcelorMittal steel company, and the balance of £3.1 million coming from the London Development Agency. The name "ArcelorMittal Orbit" combines the name of Mittal's company, as chief sponsor, with Orbit, the original working title for Kapoor and Balmond's design.

The ArcelorMittal Orbit temporarily closed after the 2012 Olympic and Paralympic Games while the South Plaza (in which Orbit is positioned) underwent reconstruction for its long-term legacy use as a public outdoor space. It re-opened to the public on 5 April 2014. The structure incorporates the world's tallest and longest – 178 m (584 ft) – tunnel slide, designed by Carsten Höller. The idea was originally envisioned by the London Legacy Development Corporation as a way to attract more visitors to the tower. The slide includes transparent sections to give a "different perspective" of the twisting red tower and was completed in June 2016. This follows an option to abseil down the tower, introduced in 2014.

== History ==
According to London mayor Boris Johnson, in around October 2008 he and Tessa Jowell decided that the site in Stratford, London that was to become the Olympic Park for the 2012 Olympics needed "something extra" to "distinguish the East London skyline", and "arouse the curiosity and wonder of Londoners and visitors".

A design competition held in 2009 called for designs for an "Olympic tower". It received about 50 submissions. Johnson has said that his early concept for the project was something more modest than Orbit, along the lines of "a kind of 21st-century Trajan's Column", but this was dropped when more daring ideas were received.

The media reported unconfirmed details of the project in October 2009, describing the interest of the steel magnate Lakshmi Mittal, one of Britain's richest men, in funding a project that would cost around £15 million. Boris Johnson was believed to want something like the Eiffel Tower or the Statue of Liberty. At that time there were understood to be five artists being considered, including Antony Gormley. Early designs reportedly included 'Transmission' by Paul Fryer, a 400-foot (120 m) high structure "resembling a cross between a pylon and a native American totem pole", according to The Times. A spokesman for Johnson would only confirm that he was "keen to see stunning, ambitious, world-class art in the Olympic Park", and that work on commissioning the project was at an early stage.

Mittal's involvement came about after a chance meeting with Johnson in a cloakroom in Davos in January 2009, as they were on their way to separate dinner engagements. In a conversation that reportedly lasted 45 seconds Johnson pitched the idea to Mittal, who immediately agreed to supply the steel. Mittal later said of his involvement, "I never expected that this was going to be such a huge project. I thought it was just the supply of some steel, a thousand tonnes or so, and that would be it. But then we started working with artists and I realised that the object was not just to supply steel but to complete the whole project. It took us almost 15 months of negotiation and discussion." Johnson has said that, "In reality, ArcelorMittal has given much more than the steel."

Kapoor's and Balmond's Orbit was announced as the winner on 31 March 2010. According to The Guardian, Orbit was chosen from a short list of three, beating a design by Antony Gormley and one by the architectural firm Caruso St John. According to The Times, Gormley's design was a 390-foot (120 m) steel colossus titled Olympian Man, a trademark piece of a statue of himself, rejected mainly on the grounds of its projected cost, estimated at £40 million.

Johnson and Jowell agreed to issue a commission for Orbit in partnership with Mittal after it was chosen by a nine-person advisory panel brought together by them to advise on a long list of proposals. According to Mittal, the panel made a unanimous decision to pick Orbit, as it both represented the Olympic Games and was achievable within the ambitious time frame. Kapoor described it as "the commission of a lifetime".

Johnson pre-empted possible criticism during the official launch by stating: "Of course some people will say we are nuts – in the depths of a recession – to be building Britain’s biggest ever piece of public art. But both Tessa Jowell and I are certain that this is the right thing for the Stratford site, in Games time and beyond."

The completed structure was officially unveiled to the press and public on 11 May 2012.

An image of the structure was included in the 2015 design of the British passport.

The structure was re-purposed with the world's longest slide in 2016, as a way to attract more visitors.

== Design ==
Audio description of ArcelorMittal Orbit by Mike Brace

=== Interpretation ===
According to Kapoor, the design brief from the Mayor's office was for a "tower of at least 100 metres (330 ft)", while Balmond said that he was told the Mayor was "looking for an icon to match the Eiffel Tower".

Kapoor said that one of the influences on his design was the Tower of Babel, the sense of "building the impossible" that "has something mythic about it", and that the form "straddles Eiffel and Tatlin". Balmond, working on the metaphor of an orbit, envisaged an electron cloud moving, to create a structure that appears unstable, propping itself up, "never centred, never quite vertical". Both believe that Orbit represents a new way of thinking, "a radical new piece of structure and architecture and art" that uses non-linearity – the use of "instabilities as stabilities." The spaces inside the structure, in between the twisting steel, are "cathedral like", according to Balmond, while according to Kapoor, the intention is that visitors will engage with the piece as they wind "up and up and in on oneself" on the spiral walkway.

The Independent described Orbit as "a continuously looping lattice ... made up of eight strands winding into each other and combined by rings like a jagged knot". The Guardian describes it as a "giant lattice tripod sporting a counterweight collar around its neck designed to offset the weight of its head, a two-storey dining and viewing gallery". According to the BBC, the design incorporates the five Olympic rings.

Upon its launch Johnson said "It would have boggled the minds of the Romans. It would have boggled Gustave Eiffel." Nicholas Serota, a member of the design panel, said that Orbit was a tower with an interesting twist, with "the energy you might traditionally associate with this type of structure but in a surprisingly female form".

According to Mittal, Orbit was already the working title, as it describes continuous action, a creative representation of the "extraordinary physical and emotional effort" that Olympians undertake in their continuous drive to do better. It was decided to keep this as the final name and prepend ArcelorMittal (as the project supporter).

On the public announcement of the design Johnson conceded that it might become known by something other than its official name, suggesting "Colossus of Stratford" or the "Hubble Bubble", in reference to his belief that it resembles a giant shisha pipe, or a variant on people's perceptions that it resembled a "giant treble clef", a "helter-skelter", or a "supersized mutant trombone".

=== Designers ===
Orbit is described as "designed by Anish Kapoor and Cecil Balmond". Kapoor is a Turner Prize winning sculptor, while Balmond is one of the world's leading designers. According to Kapoor, both men are "interested in a place where architecture meets sculpture" and "the way that form and geometry give rise to structure". Kapoor and Balmond stated that their interests have blurred and crossed over into each other's fields since they first began working together in 2002 on Kapoor's Marsyas installation in the Turbine Hall of the Tate Modern. As well as Orbit, in 2010 Kapoor and Balmond were also working on the Tees Valley Giants, a public art project in northern England.

The sculpture was engineered by the Global engineer Arup, who developed the overall geometry, structural design and the building services including the lighting displayed extensively during the Olympic games. Architectural input by Kathryn Findlay (Ushida Findlay Architects, as a sub-consultant to Arup) made the sculpture into a functional building, for example designing the staircase.

=== Structural ===
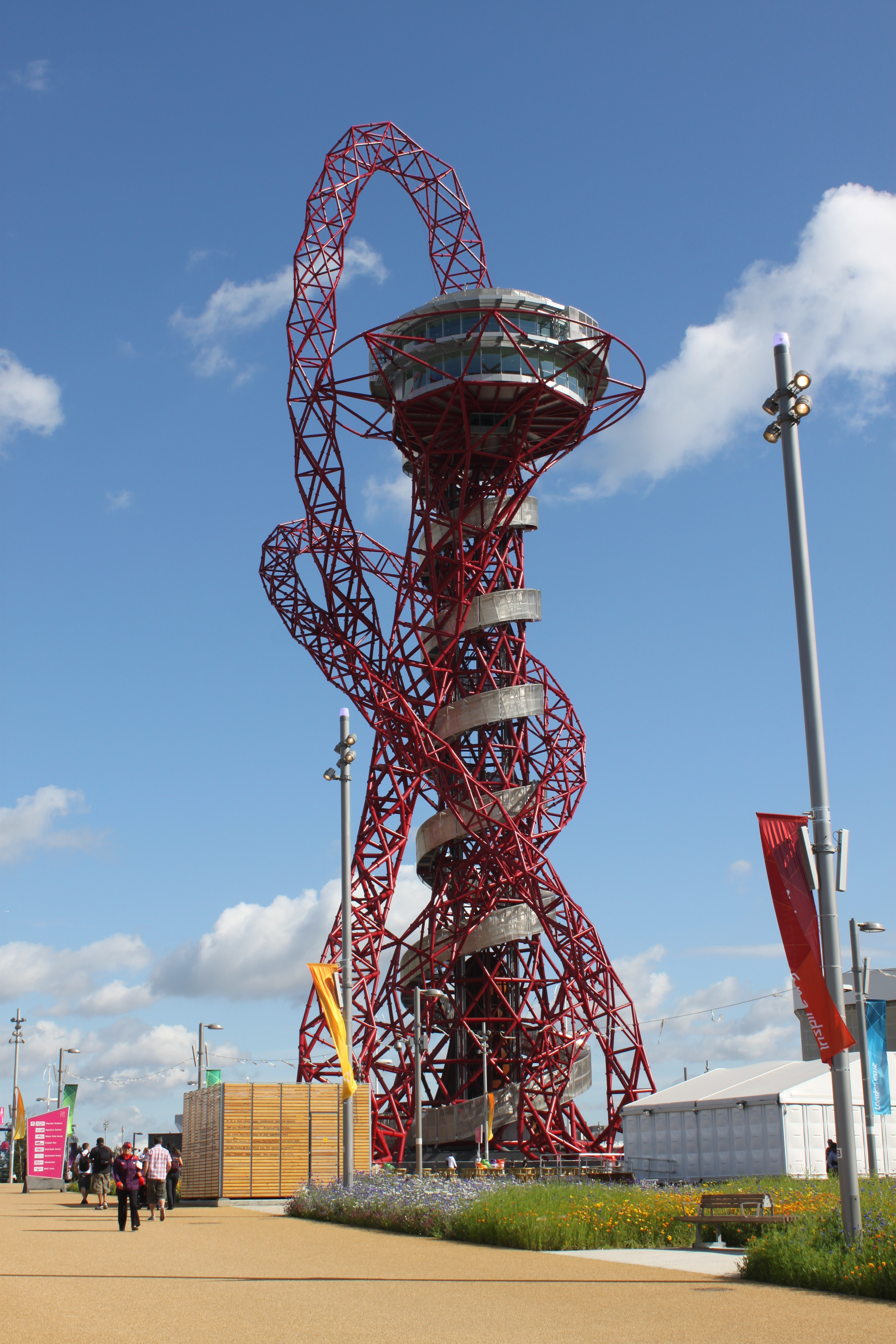
The ArcelorMittal Orbit during the 2012 Summer Olympics.

The organic design of Orbit demanded an extraordinary amount of structural engineering work. This was done by Arup, which reported that it took up two-thirds of the budget for the project (twice the percentage normally allotted to structural engineering in a building project).

From a structural point of view, Orbit consists of two parts:

- the trunk – the more-or-less vertical tower which houses the elevators and stairs and supports the observation deck.
- the red tube – an open lattice of red steel that surrounds the trunk.

The trunk has a base diameter of 37 metres (121 ft), narrowing to 5 metres (16 ft) on the way up, then widening again to 9.6 metres (31 ft) just under the observation deck. The trunk is supported and stabilized by the tube, which gives a structural character of a tripod to the entire construction. Further structural integrity is given to the construction by octagonal steel rings that surround the tube and trunk, spaced at 4 metres (13 ft) and cross-joined pairwise by sixteen diagonally mounted steel connectors.

A special part of the construction is the canopy, the conic shape that hangs off the bottom of the trunk. Originally planned as a fibreglass composite construction, costs forced the use of steel for this section as well. Centraalstaal was approached as a special consultant for the design of the steel cone and came up with a design for a cone built out of 117 individually shaped steel panels with a total surface area of 586 square metres. The entire cone weighs 84 tonnes.

=== Height ===
Early contradictory reports suggested the tower would be 120 metres (390 ft) tall. However, it finally measured in at 114.5 metres (376 ft), making it the UK's tallest sculpture, surpassing the 60-metre (200 ft) tall Aspire in Nottingham.

On announcing the project, the Greater London Authority described Orbit's height in comparison with the Statue of Liberty, stating that it would be 22 metres (72 ft) taller – the Statue of Liberty is 93 metres (305 ft) high, including the 46-metre (151 ft) statue and its pedestal. The media picked up the apparent intention to cast the Orbit as London's answer to the Eiffel Tower, which is 324 metres (1,063 ft) tall. The Guardian related how it was "considerably shorter", also noting that it is even "20 metres (66 ft) shorter than the diminutive Blackpool Tower".

Its height was also compared in the media with other London landmarks. It was described as being "slightly taller" or "nearly 20 metres (66 ft) taller" than the Big Ben clock tower, the centrepiece of the Palace of Westminster. It was also described as being "twice as tall" or "more than double the height" of Nelson's Column, the monument honouring Admiral Nelson in Trafalgar Square. Other reports described how it was "just short of" or "almost as tall as" the Great Pyramid of Giza in Egypt, the ancient tomb of the Pharaoh Khufu. Big Ben is 96.3 metres (316 ft) tall, Nelson's Column is 51.5 metres (169 ft) tall, including statue and column. The Giza Pyramid was thought to have been constructed as 280 Egyptian cubits or 146.478 metres (480.57 ft) tall, although with erosion it has reduced in height by nearly 10 metres.

== Construction ==
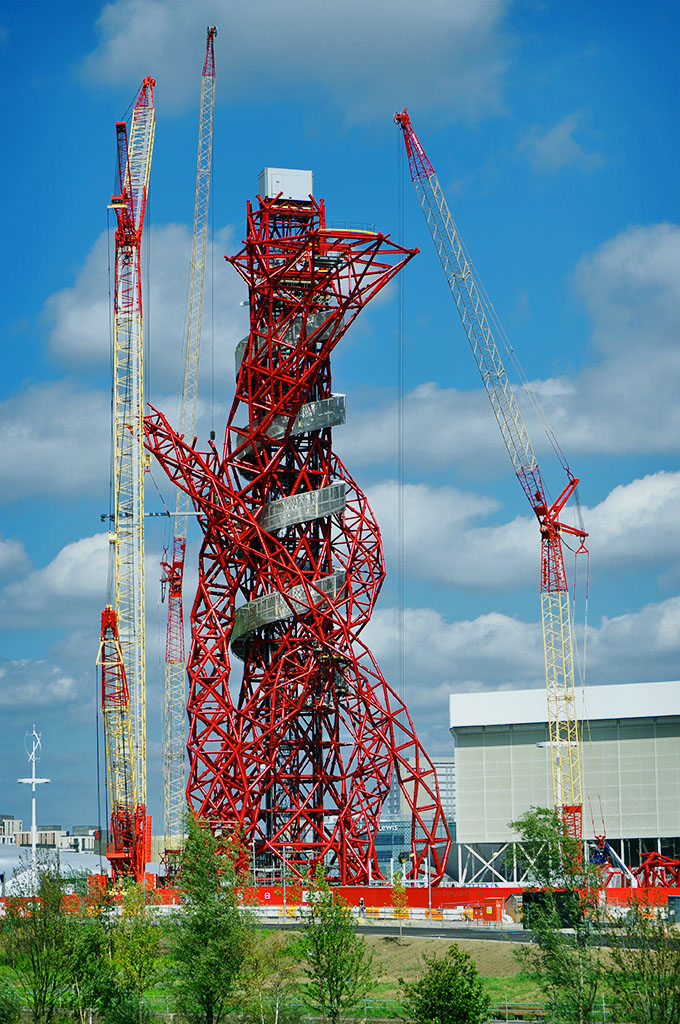
Construction in September 2011.

Orbit is located in the southern area of the Olympic Park, between London Stadium and the Aquatics Centre. After the March 2010 confirmation of the winning design, construction began in November 2010; it reached its full height in November 2011.

Steel is the primary material used in the sculpture. According to Balmond, there was no feasible alternative, as steel was the only material that could give the minimum thickness and maximum strength represented in the coiling structure. It was built from approximately 2000 tonnes of steel, produced as much as possible from ArcelorMittal plants, with the exact sourcing being determined by the grades of steel required and the technical requirements of the project. Of this, 60% was recycled steel produced by the Esch Belval steel plant in Luxembourg.

On 14 March 2011, with construction already underway on the main pylon, The One Show broadcast footage of the on-site status of project, and profiled the four-man team putting it together, comprising two steel erectors, a crane operator and a site foreman.

== Use ==
As an observation tower, Orbit has two indoor viewing platforms on two levels, with each level having capacity for 150 people. According to the Greater London Authority, the observation platform offers "unparalleled views of the entire 250 acres (1.0 km^{2}; 0.39 sq mi) of the Olympic Park and London's skyline". According to The Independent, visitors should take the lift to the top and descend the 455-step staircase; this should allow them to appreciate the views around which Anish Kapoor arranged the sculpture.

It is designed to cope with 700 visitors per hour. During the Olympic Games the entrance fee was £15 for adults and £7 for children. The tower does not include a dining area, however there is a cafe, shop and other facilities at the South Park Hub building, which opened in April 2014.

The ambition is that the sculpture, as well as being a focal point for the Olympic Park during the Games, will form part of the wider Stratford regeneration plans, which aim to turn the Olympic site into a permanent tourist destination after the Games. Tessa Jowell said Orbit will be "like honey to bees for the millions of tourists that visit London each year". Boris Johnson predicted it would become "the perfect iconic cultural legacy". According to Lord Coe, chairman of the London 2012 Olympic organisers, it would play a central part in the Game's role of leaving a lasting legacy and transformed landscape in east London.

During the opening ceremony of the 2012 Summer Paralympics, Joe Townsend (a Royal Marine and double amputee) delivered the Paralympic flame into Olympic Stadium via a zipline that was attached to the top of Orbit.

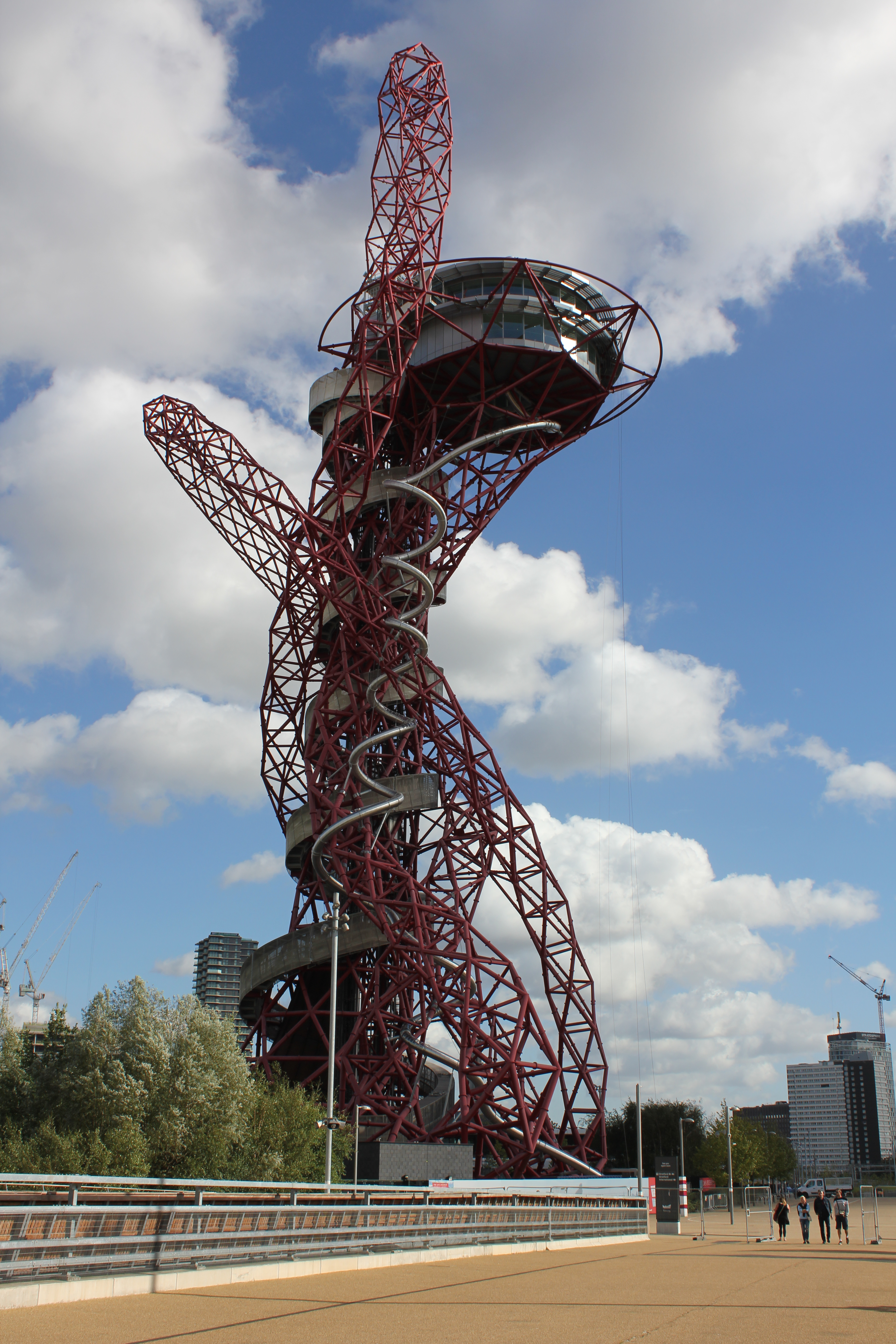
Orbit in 2016 with The Slide added

In 2016, a permanent slide designed by German artist Carsten Höller was added to the sculpture. The slide is reported to be the world's tallest and longest tunnel slide at 178 metres. Though it was originally reported that admission to the slide would cost around £5, the general adult price for entry to the slide and viewing platforms is £30.00 (£25.00 if bought in advance), as of March 2023.

== Funding ==
At the time of its public launch, the total cost of Orbit was announced as £19.1 million. ArcelorMittal was to fund up to £16 million, with the remaining £3.1 million being provided by the London Development Agency. This consists of a £10 million cash donation, and £6 million in underwriting of capital costs, which could be potentially recovered from profits generated after the Games. According to Johnson, the cost of the project would be recouped after the games through the private hire of a dining area at the top, predicting it would become a "corporate money-making venture".

Mittal said he was immediately interested in Orbit after he remembered the excitement that surrounded the announcement that London had won the Olympic bid. He saw it as an opportunity to leave a lasting legacy for London, showcase the "unique qualities of steel" and play a role in the regeneration of Stratford. Mittal said of his involvement in the project, "I live in London – I’ve lived here since 1997 – and I think it’s a wonderful city. This project is an incredible opportunity to build something really spectacular for London, for the Olympic Games and something that will play a lasting role in the legacy of the Games."

Advisory panel member and director of the Tate gallery, Nicholas Serota, said Orbit was "the perfect answer to the question of how sport and art come together", and praised Mittal's "really impressive piece of patronage" for supporting a "great commission".

In October 2015 Len Duvall, a Labour member of the London Assembly, stated that the tower was losing £520,000 a year; LLDC said they had revised their visitor target from 350,000 to 150,000 per year.

== Reception ==
Overall reception to Orbit was mixed, but mostly negative. With regard to its potential as a lasting visitor attraction, The Guardian's Mark Brown reflected on the mixed fortunes of other large symbolic London visitor attractions such as the popular, but loss-making, Thames Tunnel; the Skylon structure, dismantled on the orders of Winston Churchill; and the successful London Eye. When plans were first reported for an Olympic tower, the media pointed to a manifesto pledge of Johnson's to crack down on tall buildings, in order to preserve London's "precious" skyline. The Times criticised the idea as a vanity project of Johnson's, with a design "matching his bravado", built to "seal his legacy", surmising it would be compared to other similar vanity projects such as the "wedding cake", the Monument to Vittorio Emanuele II built in Rome, or the Neutrality Arch, a rotating golden statue erected by Turkmenistan's President Saparmurat Niyazov, while comparing Johnson to Ozymandias. Art critic Brian Sewell said "Our country is littered with public art of absolutely no merit. We are entering a new period of fascist gigantism. These are monuments to egos and you couldn't find a more monumental ego than Boris."

The Times reported the description of it being the "Godzilla of public art". In October 2012, ArcelorMittal Orbit was nominated and made the Building Design magazine shortlist for the Carbuncle Cup—an award for the worst British building completed in the past year, which was ultimately awarded to the Cutty Sark renovation.

Jay Merrick of The Independent said that "[Orbit's] sculptural power lies in its ability to suggest an unfinished form in the process of becoming something else", describing how its artistic riskiness elevated it above the banal artworks of the public art movement that have been built elsewhere in Britain's towns and cities. Merrick was of the opinion that it would be either loved or hated, being a design which is "beautifully fractious, and not quite knowable". Jonathan Glancey of The Guardian described Orbit as "Olympian in ambition" and a "fusion between striking art and daring engineering", and said that, the Aquatics Centre apart, it represented the architecturally striking Joker in the pack, given that the rest of the landscaping and architecture for the Games "promises little to get excited about". He believed it would become a "genuine eyecatcher" for the Olympics television coverage, with its extraordinary form being a "strange and enticing marriage of sorts" between the Eiffel Tower and the un-built early Soviet era Tatlin's Tower, with the biblical Tower of Babel as "best man".

Richard Morrison of The Times described Orbit as "like an enormous wire-mesh fence that has got hopelessly snagged round the bell of a giant french horn", adding that it "seems like an awful lot of trouble just to look at East London", in comparison to a music hall comedian's refrain at the $16 million cost of the Brooklyn Bridge. Morrison not only compared Johnson to Ozymandias, but also to the 20th century dictators Adolf Hitler, Joseph Stalin and Nicolae Ceaușescu, in their acts of "phallic politics" in building grandiose monuments. Criticising the lack of public involvement, he described how it would be an "undesired intrusion by the few into the consciousness of the many". He feared that it could become one of the many "thousands of naff eyesores" of recent public art in Britain, citing the embracing couple at St Pancras station (The Meeting Place), the Dockland's Traffic Light tree, and the proposed Rotherhithe Tunnel 'match-stick man' tribute to Isambard Kingdom Brunel, as London-based examples. Fellow Times writer Tom Dyckhoff, while calling it "a gift to the tabloids" and a "giant Mr. Messy", questioned whether the Olympic site needed another pointless icon, postulating whether it would stand the test of time like the London Eye and become a true icon to match the Eiffel Tower, or a hopeless white elephant. Suggesting the project had echoes of Tatlin's Monument to the Third International, and especially Constant Nieuwenhuys' utopian city New Babylon, he asked whether Orbit was just as revolutionary or possessed the same ideological purpose, or whether it was merely "a giant advert for one of the world’s biggest multinationals, sweetened with a bit of fun".

Rowan Moore of The Guardian questioned if it was going to be anything more than a folly, or whether it would be as eloquent as the Statue of Liberty. He speculated that the project might mark the time when society stops using large iconic projects as a tool for lifting areas out of deprivation. He questioned its ability to draw people's attention to Stratford after the Games, in a similar manner to the successes of the Angel of the North or the Guggenheim Museum Bilbao. He also questioned the piece's ability to strike a chord like the Angel, which he believed had at least "created a feelgood factor and sense of pride" in Gateshead, or whether it would simply become one of the "many more unloved rotting wrecks that no one has the nerve to demolish". He postulated that the addition of stairs and a lift made Orbit less succinct than Kapoor's previous successful works, while ultimately he said "hard to see what the big idea is, beyond the idea of making something big".

Fellow Guardian writer John Graham-Cumming rejected comparisons to icons like the Eiffel Tower, which had itself not been intended to be a lasting monument, only persisting into public acceptance as art through being useful; he also pointed out the Colossus of Rhodes collapsed within a few decades, and the Tower of Babel was "constructed to glorify those that constructed it." He suggested that Johnson should reconsider whether it should be pulled down after 20 years. Questioning its corporate role, he believed that meant it looked less and less like a work of art and more like a vanity project. In an online poll published by The Guardian, 38.6% of readers considered it a "grand design", while 61.4% considered it "garbage".

Responding to concerns from The Times that ArcelorMittal's sponsorship and naming of Orbit would represent an improper incursion of corporate branding into public life, Johnson stated that Olympic rules mean that it cannot carry any corporate branding during the games. Felicity Carus of The Guardian's environment blog questioned whether ArcelorMittal's record on carbon emissions was good enough to mean Orbit represented a fitting monument for the 2012 Olympics, billed as a 'world's first sustainable Olympics'.

In 2024, The New York Times' architecture critic Michael Kimmelman called Orbit "possibly the worst public sculpture of the 21st century."

== Advisory panel ==
The advisory panel consisted of:

- Nicholas Serota, director of the Tate gallery
- Julia Peyton-Jones, director of the Serpentine Gallery
- Hans-Ulrich Obrist, also of the Serpentine Gallery
- Sarah Weir, of the Olympic Delivery Authority
- Stuart Lipton, of Chelsfield LLP
- Anita Zabludowicz, of the 176 gallery Zabludowicz collection
- Michael Morris and James Lingwood, directors of the Artangel arts commissioning organisation
- Munira Mirza, the Mayoral Advisor on Arts and Culture

In announcing the winning design, Johnson thanked the Greater London Authority, the Olympic Delivery Authority and the London Organising Committee of the Olympic Games and Paralympic Games, as well as David McAlpine and Philip Dilley of Arup, and Sir Robin Wales and Jules Pipe for their involvement and support in the project.

== See also ==
- B of the Bang, the 2002 Manchester Commonwealth Games sculpture
- Skylon, the London 1951 Festival of Britain tower
- The White Horse at Ebbsfleet, a proposed giant sculpture for Kent
- Googie architecture, earlier space-inspired architecture
- Unisphere, constructed by competitor United States Steel for the 1964 New York World's Fair
