= Nebra =

Nebra may refer to:

== Places ==
- Nebra (Unstrut), a town in the state of Saxony-Anhalt, Germany
- Nebra, a parish in the municipality of Porto do Son, province of A Coruña, Galicia, Spain

== People ==
- Nebra (pharaoh), Ancient Egyptian King of the Second Dynasty
- Manuel Blasco de Nebra, Spanish composer from Seville
- José de Nebra, Spanish composer from Cuenca

== See also ==
- Nebra sky disk, ancient bronze disk from Germany
