= Lamentate =

2002 musical composition by Arvo Pärt

- by Arvo Pärt
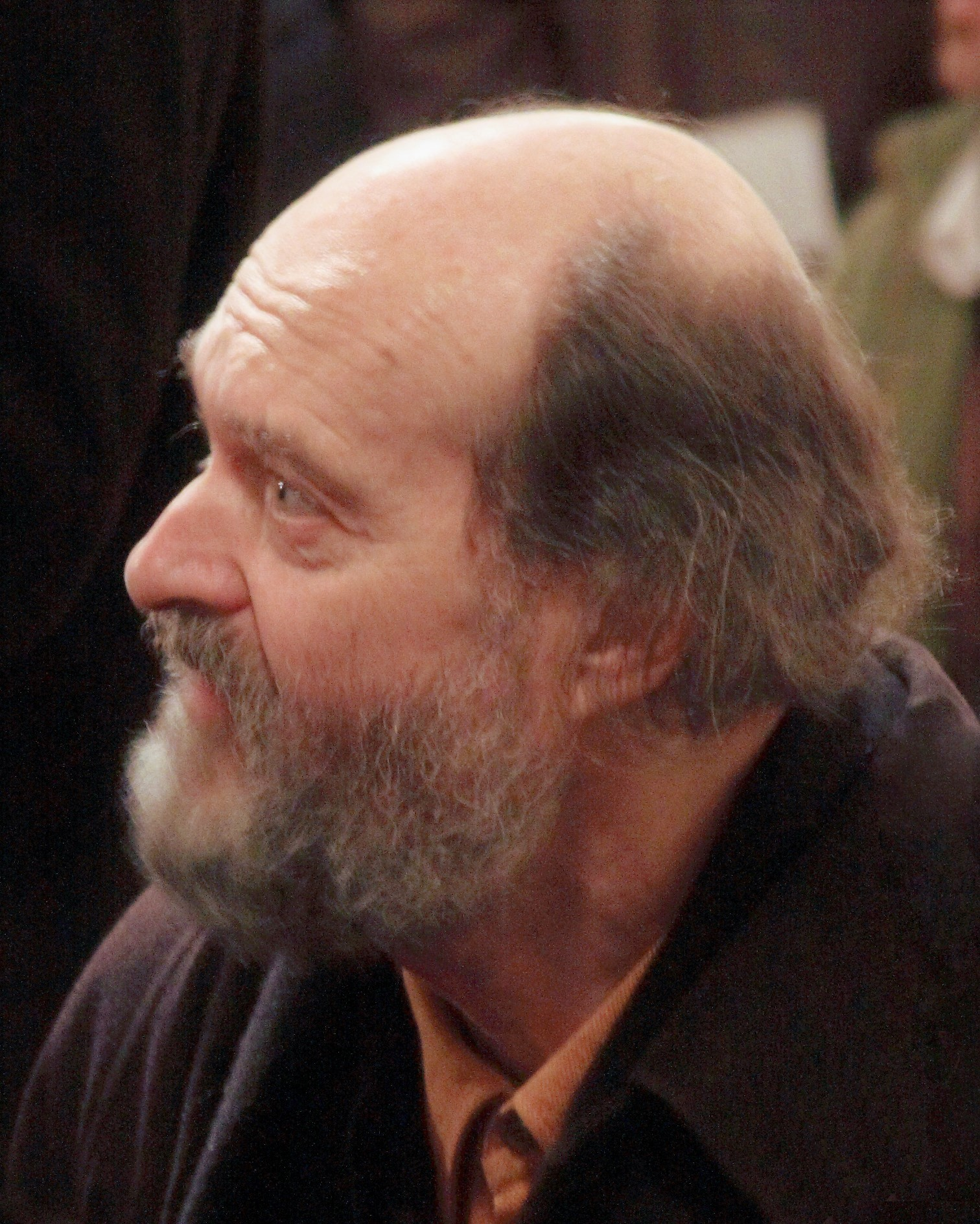
- The composer in 2008
- Composed: 2002
- Dedication: Homage to Anish Kapoor and his sculpture "Marsyas"
- Scoring: piano; orchestra

Premiere
- Date: 7 February 2003
- Location: Turbine Hall of Tate Modern Museum, London
- Conductor: Alexander Briger
- Performers: Hélène Grimaud; London Sinfonietta

Lamentate (Homage to Anish Kapoor and his sculpture "Marsyas") for piano and orchestra is the largest instrumental work by Estonian composer Arvo Pärt. The work was commissioned by Tate and Egg Live, written in 2002, and premiered on 7 and 8 February 2003 in the Turbine Hall of Tate Modern Museum in London where the massive "Marsyas" was installed. The pianist for the premiere was Hélène Grimaud, with Alexander Briger conducting the London Sinfonietta. The piece is written in the tintinnabuli style, the technique Pärt created in 1976.

The approximate duration of the piece is 35–40 minutes.

== Instrumentation ==
Besides the solo piano, the piece is scored for 2 flutes (2nd doubling alto flute and piccolo), 2 oboes (2nd doubling English horn), 2 clarinets, 2 bassoons, 4 horns, 2 trumpets (2nd doubling piccolo trumpet), 2 trombones, timpani, percussion, and strings.

== The New York premiere ==
The New York premiere of Lamentate took place on January 31, 2012 in Carnegie Hall, in the first part of the 75th birthday tribute concert for the composer Philip Glass who specially requested the piece to be performed.

== Arvo Pärt on Lamentate ==
"The work is marked by diametrically opposed moods... Exaggerating slightly, I would characterize these poles as 'brutal-overwhelming' and 'intimate-fragile'."

"My first impression was that I, as a living being, was standing before my own body and was dead – as in a time-warp perspective, at once in the future and the present. Suddenly, I found myself put into a position in which my life appeared in a different light. And I was moved to ask myself just what I could still manage to accomplish in the time left to me."

"I have written a lamento – not for the dead, but for the living."

"Anish Kapoor's sculpture shatters not only concepts of space, but also – in my view – concepts of time. The boundary between time and timelessness no longer seems so important."

"The composition cannot really be described as a typical piano concerto. I chose the piano to be the solo instrument because it fixes our attention on something that is "one".

== Recordings ==
- Brilliant Classics (Piano Classics) released in 2023 a CD named "Pärt: Lamentate" with pianist and zen master Pedro Piquero as soloist and the Orquesta de Extremadura conducted under Álvaro Albiach.
- Accentus Music released a new recording in honor of Arvo Pärt's 85th birthday on September 11, 2020. Onutė Gražinytė made her recording debut, with the Lithuanian National Symphony.
- ECM released the CD "Lamentate" to celebrate Pärt's 70th birthday on 11 September 2005. Alexei Lubimov was the pianist.
- Naxos released a CD – Pärt: Piano Music – Piano Sonatine / Partita / Lamentate in 2011. Ralph van Raat was the pianist.
- A CD was released in 2017 by Orange Mountain Music. The Bruckner Orchester Linz was conducted by Dennis Russell Davies, and Maki Namekawa was the pianist.
