= Pedro Piquero =

Pianist, translator and Buddhist teacher

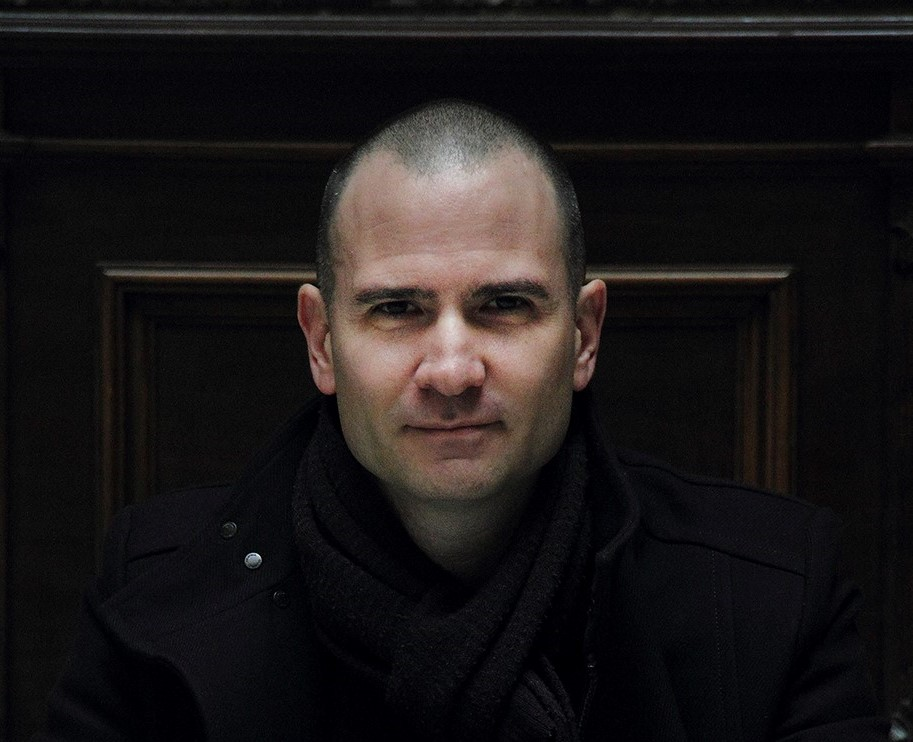
Pedro Piquero

Pedro Piquero (Seville, 1976), also known as Pedro Kaiten Piquero, is a Spanish pianist, translator, Zen Buddhist teacher and animal rights activist.

== Biography ==
Pedro Piquero completed his musical training with Esteban Sánchez in Spain and Caio Pagano in the United States, respectively, and graduated cum laude from Arizona State University. He has performed in the United States, South America, Mexico, Switzerland, Belgium, Spain, Portugal, and Sweden. In 2002, he completed a residency at the Belgais Center for Arts under the direction of pianist Maria João Pires in Portugal. He has received several awards and recorded for the Verso, Columna Música, Nîbius, and Brilliant Classics labels, as a soloist with the brothers Gerard and Lluis Claret, with the Orchestra of Extremadura, and with actor Alberto Amarilla. In 2016, Pedro Piquero was the executive producer of the documentary film Silente about the life and work of 18th-century Spanish composer Joaquín Montero.

In his work as a translator, Pedro Piquero, together with Gudō Wafu Nishijima, has edited the four-volume edition of Eihei Dogen's Shōbōgenzō (Sirio, 2013-2016), a fundamental philosophical text of Japanese Soto Zen Buddhism, and Nāgārjuna's Mūlamadhyamakakārikā (Sirio, 2019), and translated and commented on Dogen's Gakudo Yojin Shu (Athenaica, 2023).

In parallel with his artistic work, in 2017 in Japan, Pedro Piquero received from Venerable Peter Rodo Rocca Dharma transmission of Soto Zen Buddhism in the lineage of Zen master Gudō Wafu Nishijima, whose last disciple he was. He is currently president of Dogen Sangha in Spain, director of Zendo Gudo and an animal rights advocate member of the international organization Dharma Voices for Animals.

== Publications as a translator and editor ==
- Eihei Dōgen: Shōbōgenzō in four volumes (Treasury of the True Dharma Eye'). Translator and editor.: Pedro Piquero and Gudō Wafu Nishijima. Sirio, Málaga 2013, 2014, 2015, 2016, ISBN 978-8478089055, ISBN 978-8478089604, ISBN 978-8416233762, ISBN 978-8416579358.
- Nāgārjuna: Mūlamadhyamakakārikā. Root Verses on the Middle Way: An annotated Zen translation on the Root Verses on the Middle Way of Nagarjuna. Translator and editor: Pedro Piquero. With commentaries by Gudō Wafu Nishijima und Brad Warner. Sirio, Málaga, 2019, ISBN 978-84-17030-31-5.
- Eihei Dōgen: Gakudo Yojin Shu: Collection of Advices on Pursuing the Buddhist Truth. Translation, edition and commentaries by Pedro Kaiten Piquero. Athenaica, Seville, 2023, ISBN 84-19874-28-0.

== Publications as a writer ==
- All sentient beings. A Buddhist manifesto in defense of animals. Athenaica, Seville, 2026, ISBN 979-13-88127-15-1.

== Discography ==
- Joaquín Nin-Culmell: Tonadas (Verso; 2008). Ref: VRS 2060
- Manuel Blasco de Nebra: Complete Piano Works. Vol. 1 (Columna Musica; 2009). Ref: 1CM0219
- Manuel Blasco de Nebra: Complete Piano Works. Vol. 2 (Columna Musica; 2010). Ref: 1CM0237
- Manuel Blasco de Nebra: Complete Piano Works. Vol. 3 (Columna Musica; 2011). Ref: 1CM0240
- Joaquín Montero: Complete Piano Works (Nibius; 2016). Ref: NIBI115
- Arvo Pärt: Piano and Chamber Music. With Lluís Claret and Gerard Claret (Nibius; 2017). Ref: NIBI124
- Milhaud & Poulenc. With Alberto Amarilla, narrator (Nibius; 2019). Ref: NIBI134
- Pärt: Lamentate. With Orquesta de Extremadura, Conductor: Álvaro Albiach (Piano Classics: CD 2023. Ref: PCL10273; Vinyl 2024. Ref: PCL10292).
- Joaquín Turina: Piano Works (Piano Classics; 2024). Ref: PCL10215
- Manuel Blasco de Nebra: Complete Piano Works (Piano Classics; 2025). Ref: PCL10324
- Explorer Set: Spanish Edition (Piano Classics; 2026). Ref: PCL10363
