= Marsyas (sculpture) =

Sculpture by Anish Kapoor

Marsyas was a 150-meter-long, ten storey high sculpture designed by Anish Kapoor. It was on show at Tate Modern gallery, London in 2003 and was commissioned as part of the Unilever Series. Marsyas was the third in a series of commissions for Tate Modern's Turbine Hall and the first to make use of the entire space. The sculpture's title refers to Marsyas, the satyr in Greek mythology, who was flayed alive by the god Apollo.

Marsyas consisted of three steel rings joined together by a single span of specially designed red PVC membrane. The two rings were positioned vertically, at each end of the space, while a third was suspended parallel with a central bridge. The design employed digital form-finding techniques that simulated forces such as surface tension, uniform and hydrostatic pressure.

The Guardian called it "the biggest sculpture at Tate Modern and probably the biggest in any art gallery in the world". Its construction was overseen by Cecil Balmond of Ove Arup and Partners, who later also collaborated with Kapoor on the ArcelorMittal Orbit which opened for the 2012 Summer Olympics.

In 2003, the composition Lamentate (Homage to Anish Kapoor and his sculpture "Marsyas") for piano and orchestra by Estonian composer Arvo Pärt was premiered in the Tate Modern Turbine Hall.
