= Ito-Balmond Serpentine Pavilion =

Coordinates: 43°17′19″N 6°36′20″E

The Ito-Balmond Serpentine Pavilion is a structure designed by Cecil Balmond and Toyo Ito and originally built for the Serpentine Gallery Pavilion programme in London's Kensington Gardens, Hyde Park, in 2002 and now part of a restaurant in southern France. It focuses on modern and contemporary art. Each year the Serpentine Gallery builds a temporary structure for the summer in its grounds, and projects are led by director Julia Peyton-Jones. The Ito-Balmond Serpentine Pavilion has been hailed as one of the most successful temporary pavilions to date. Jonathan Glancey, architecture critic for the UK's The Guardian, called it "one of the most exquisite and revolutionary buildings of recent times." The design is based on an algorithm designed by Balmond. "Although fun to look at, this structure was rooted in complex geometry…the pavilion had no façade and no hidden structural frame behind it… what you saw was 100% pure structure, its holistic beauty like that of a crystal or a snowflake." Balmond was awarded the Gengo Matsui Prize for the pavilion, one of the highest awards for engineering given in Japan. The pavilion now serves as the beach club restaurant of a luxury hotel in Le Beauvallon, across the bay from Saint-Tropez in southern France. Ito and Balmond have since collaborated on the Taichung Opera House in Taiwan.
