= Freedom Sculpture =

Sculpture by Cecil Balmond in Los Angeles, Cal., US

The Freedom Sculpture
- Artist: Cecil Balmond
- Year: July 4, 2017
- Medium: Stainless Steel
- Subject: Human rights, Freedom of religion, Multiculturalism, Inclusiveness
- Dimensions: 4.6 by 6.1 by 2.75 meters (15.1 ft × 20.0 ft × 9.0 ft)
- Weight: 9,253 kg
- Location: Century City, Los Angeles, California.; 34.06305°N 118.41569°W

The Freedom Sculpture or Freedom: A Shared Dream, is a 20,400 lb (9,300 kg) stainless steel, gold, and silver public art sculpture in Century City, Los Angeles, California, by artist and architect Cecil Balmond. Balmond applied both titles to this sculpture, inspired by the 2,500 year old Cyrus Cylinder considered by some to have been an early written declaration of human rights by Cyrus the Great, King of ancient Iran, who was viewed as granting individual and religious freedoms to all those within his vast and culturally diverse empire.

== Design and construction ==
The sculpture was commissioned by the Farhang Foundation, and Balmond's design was selected among over 300 worldwide entries. The double-cylinder sculpture is made of two water jet-cut stainless steel double cylinders (gold interior cylinder, silver exterior cylinder), supported by two 15-foot diameter stainless steel half-rings. The sculpture sits on a travertine stone platform and includes lighting.

== Donation and unveiling ==
The sculpture was officially donated to the city of Los Angeles and unveiled on July 4, 2017 with a crowd of over 75,000 attendees. At the unveiling ceremony, a proclamation of support by California Governor Jerry Brown was read. Also, Los Angeles Mayor Eric Garcetti sent a video message and Fifth District Councilman Paul Koretz presented a certificate of appreciation to the Farhang Foundation and the Iranian-American community.

The sculpture is located on Santa Monica Boulevard on a street median at Century City, Los Angeles, California.

== Funding and support ==
The Freedom Sculpture generated significant support on social media, with over 1.1 million fans supporting its creation with over $2.2 million. While crowd-funding played a significant role in raising money for The Freedom Sculpture, a relatively small group of people, comprising the Freedom Sculpture Founders Circle, contributed over 50% of the funds raised.

== See also ==
- Cyrus Cylinder
- Statue of Liberty (Liberty Enlightening the World)
- Iranian Americans
- Statue of Freedom, 1863 statue atop the U.S. Capitol dome, Washington, D.C.
- Goddess of Liberty, an 1888 statue by Elijah E. Myers atop the Texas State Capitol dome, in Austin, Texas
- Miss Freedom, 1889 statue on the dome of the Georgia State Capitol (US)
- Freedom, 1985 statue by Alfred Tibor in Columbus, Ohio
