= Pedro e Inês bridge =

Footbridge in Coimbra, Portugal

Coordinates: 40°12′4″N 8°25′38″W

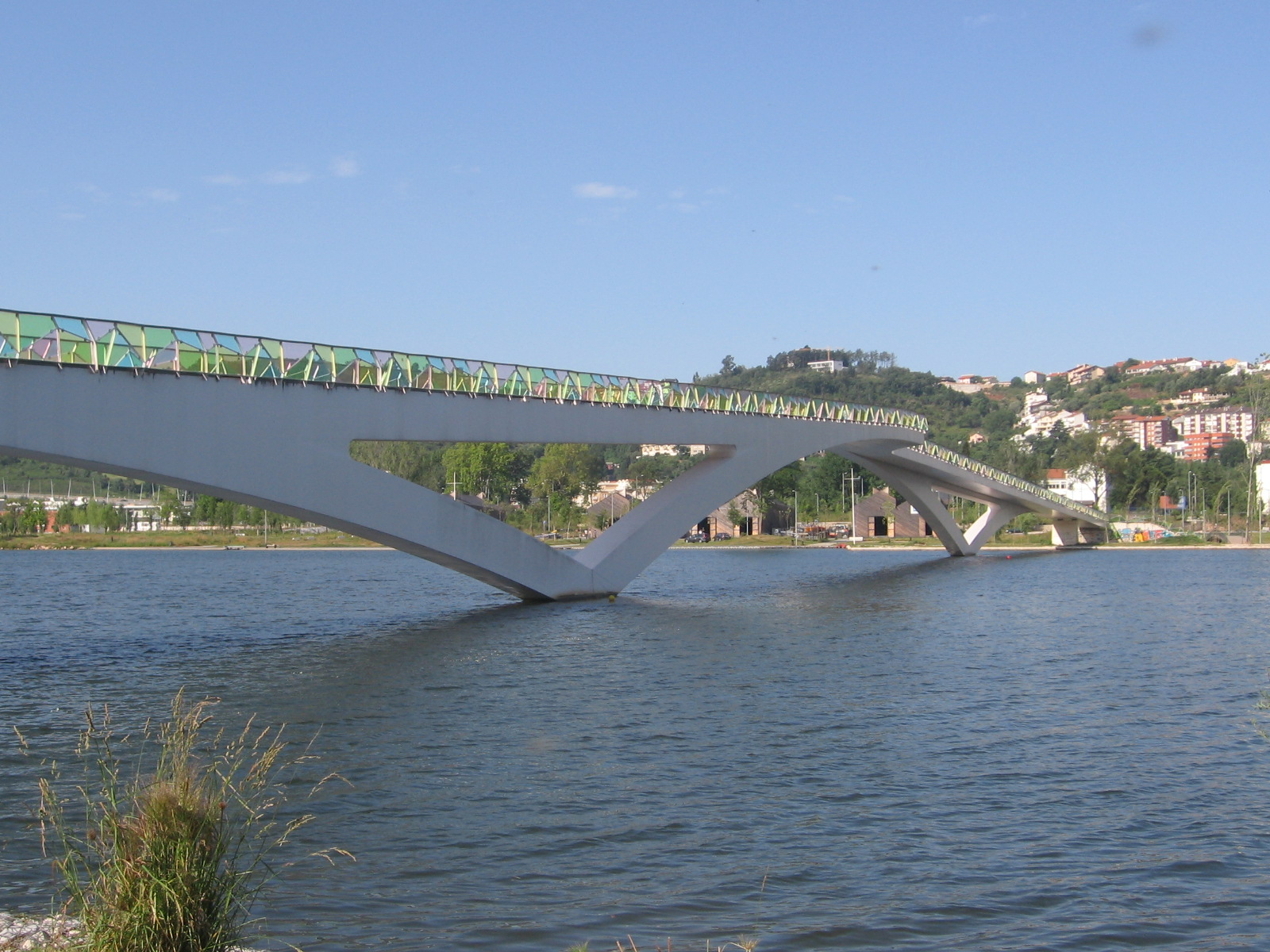
Pedro e Inês pedestrian bridge

The Pedro e Inês bridge is a footbridge opened in 2007 in the town of Coimbra in Portugal. It was designed by Cecil Balmond, Arup Group, and Portuguese civil engineer António Adão da Fonseca.

Spanning the Rio Mondego, the 600 feet (180 m) structure is the city's first footbridge and has become locally known as the "bridge that doesn't meet."

Partly inspired by skipping stones, the design is created from two cantilevered walkways joining in the middle. Each walkway is responsible for supporting the other - the two halves are displaced, giving the visual effect of a bridge that does not meet. Wallpaper magazine said the bridge "appears at first glimpse to be impossible." The balustrade is made from a clear, fractal pattern crafted in coloured blue, pink, green and yellow glass.

The bridge is named for the ill-fated affair between Pedro, the Crown Prince of Portugal, and the Queen's lady-in-waiting, Inês de Castro.
