= Javier Perianes =

Spanish classical pianist

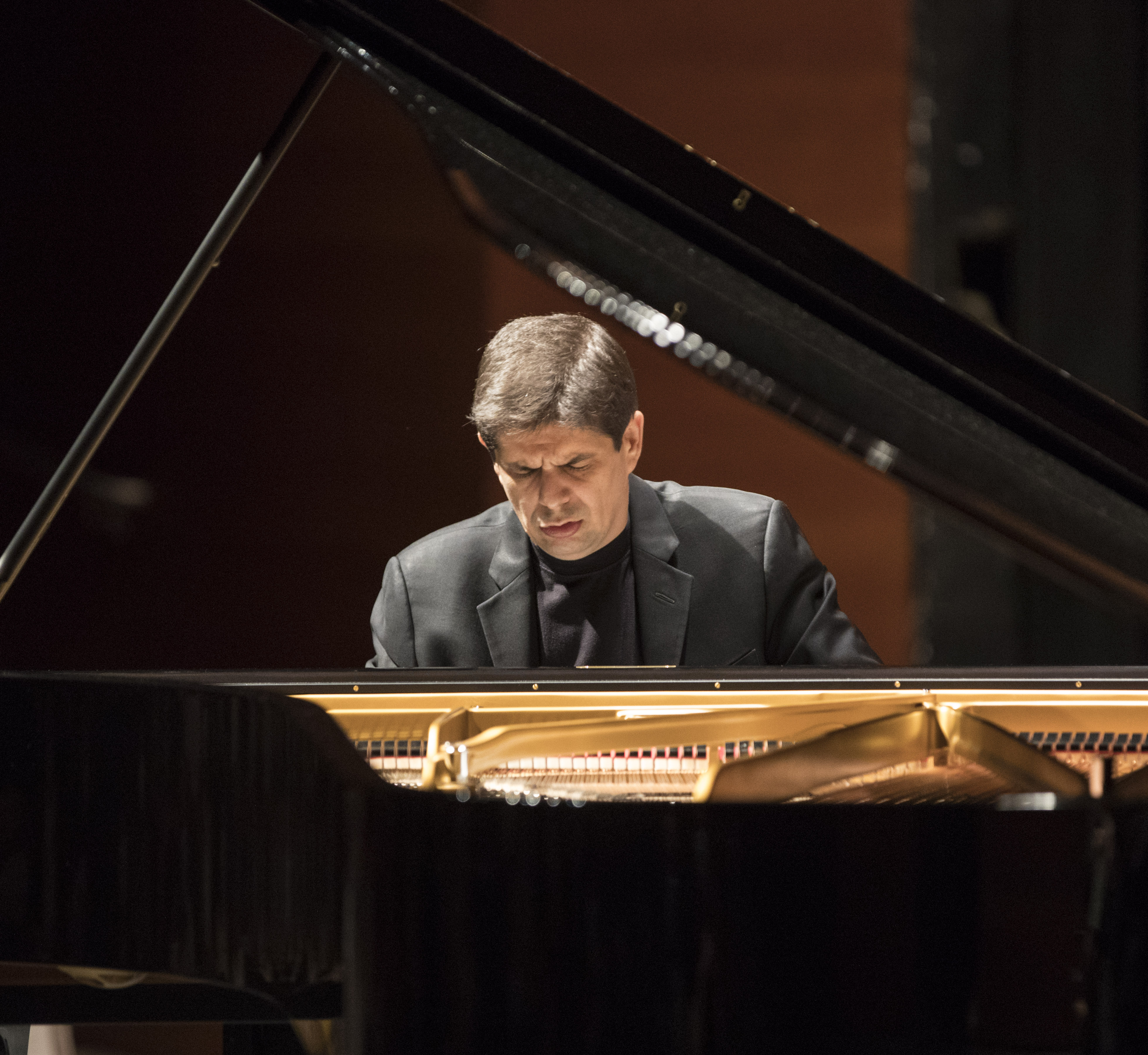
Perianes in 2020

Javier Perianes (born 24 September 1978 in Nerva, Spain) is a Spanish classical pianist. He is a participant at many renowned festivals within Spain, including Santander, Granada, Peralada and San Sebastián. He has performed in distinguished concert series throughout the world, having made appearances in New York City's Carnegie Hall, Washington DC Concertgebouw Amsterdam, the Tchaikovsky Conservatory in Moscow, the Shanghai Conservatory, Madrid's Auditorio Nacional, Palau in Barcelona, recitals at the Ravinia and Gilmore International Festivals in Chicago, Festival de La Roque-d'Anthéron in France and the Konzerthaus in Berlin.

He has been a frequent prize-winner at competitions, including First Prize and gold medal at the 42nd International Competition Premio Jaén de Piano; First Prize at the 8th International Piano Competition Fundación Jacinto e Inocencio Guerrero; and was a prize-winner at the 14th International Competition Vianna da Motta in Lisbon.

Perianes has worked with leading conductors including Lorin Maazel, Daniel Barenboim, Zubin Mehta, Rafael Frühbeck de Burgos, Jesús López Cobos, Antoni Wit, Daniel Harding and Vasily Petrenko. Recent and forthcoming highlights include appearances with the Israel Philharmonic under Zubin Mehta, including a performance at the Lucerne Festival, the New World Symphony conducted by Michael Tilson Thomas, the London Philharmonic and Sao Paulo Symphony with Eduardo Portal, Tokyo Symphony Orchestra with Hiroshi Kodama, Warsaw Philharmonic, as well as recitals in Tokyo, Madrid's Scherzo series, the Zurich Tonhalle and at the Moscow December Nights Festival.

Perianes has received critical acclaim for his recordings on Harmonia Mundi of Schubert's Impromptus and Klavierstücke, MendelssohnManuel Blasco de Nebra's keyboard sonatas and Federico Mompou's Música Callada. In September 2011, he released on this label a disc devoted to the music for piano by Manuel de Falla, including a live recording of Nights in the Gardens of Spain with the BBC Symphony Orchestra under Josep Pons.

In 2015, he released a recording of Grieg's Piano Concerto, accompanied by the BBC Symphony Orchestra under Sakari Oramo, coupled with a selection of the composer's Lyric Pieces.

Quote from the Michael Kennedy of the Sunday Telegraph regarding his Schubert CD (Harmonia Mundi): "This young Spanish pianist proves himself a natural Schubertian in the Impromptus (D 899). He is beautifully recorded so that his playing can be fully appreciated. The disc also includes the Klavierstücke (D 946) and the less well-known Allegretto in C minor (D 915), a wonderful piece all the more compelling for being understated. Perianes's playing captures its magic to perfection."

== Discography ==
- Claude Debussy, Preludes, Estampas, HM, 2018
- Claude Debussy, Sonata cello and piano, Jean Guihen Queyras, cello, HM 2018
- Bela Bartok, Concerto N 3, Pablo Heras-Casado (2017)
- Granados, Turina, Cuarteto Quiroga, 2017
- Mendelssohn, Songs without words, HM
- ..les sons et les parfums, Chopin – Debussy (2013).
- Franz Schubert / Impromptus
- Franz Schubert, Sonatas 13 – 21,
- Federico Mompou / Música Callada. Harmonia Mundi (2006)
- Manuel Blasco de Nebra / Sonatas. Harmonia Mundi (2010)
- Recital Patio de los Arrayanes 2005 (Disco Excepcional Scherzo octubre de 2006).
- Beethoven / Moto perpetuo (Sonatas Op.26, 31, 54, 90). Harmonia Mundi (2012)
- Manuel de Falla / Noches en los jardines de España
- Beethoven, Barenboim Masterclass: United by Beethoven, EMI
- Encuentro, Javier Perianes, Estrella Morente, HM
- Enrique Granados: Goyescas – El Pelele – Javier Perianes (Harmonia Mundi) released December 2023
- Domenico Scarlatti: Keyboard Sonatas – Javier Perianes (Harmonia Mundi) released August 2025
