= Kathryn Findlay =

Scottish architect

- Born: 26 January 1953; Forfar, Scotland
- Died: 10 January 2014 (aged 60); London, England
- Education: Edinburgh College of Art; Architectural Association
- Occupation: Architect
- Practice: Ushida Findlay Architects

Kathryn Findlay (26 January 1953 – 10 January 2014) was a Scottish architect.

== Early life and education ==
Findlay was born in Forfar in Scotland, the daughter of a sheep farmer, and studied fine arts at the Edinburgh College of Art. She moved to England at the end of her first year in 1972 to study at the Architectural Association. While Findlay was studying at the Architectural Association, she was tutored by Peter Cook, Christine Hawley, and Leon Van Schaik. Findlay graduated with an Architectural Association Diploma in 1979.

== Career in Japan ==
In 1979 Findlay went to Tokyo. While there, Findlay worked in Arata Isozaki's office where she met her future husband, Eisaku Ushida. Findlay formed the architectural practice, Ushida Findlay, in Tokyo in 1986 with her then-husband, Eisaku Ushida. While in Japan, Findlay spent twenty years teaching and working in Japan. She was appointed as the first female academic in the Department of Architecture at the Tokyo University and the first foreigner to teach there since the 19th century Meiji Period.

Ushida Findlay built the Truss Wall House (1993) and Soft and Hairy House (1994) with their practice gaining recognition.

== Later career ==
Findlay eventually returned to London and took her practice with her after having split from her husband in 1999. Findlay worked on notable projects such as the RIBA Nominated Grafton New Hall (2002) and Pool House 2 (2009). The practice also undertook a number of other projects that were not realized, including one for a country house in a radical 'starfish' design in Cheshire, and another for a Maggie's cancer centre for Wishaw hospital, Lanarkshire. Findlay's practice went into bankruptcy in 2004. Findlay was subsequently employed by the School of Architecture at the University of Dundee, becoming a professor of Architecture and Environment in 2006. She was elected an Associate Member of the Royal Scottish Academy in 2007. In 2012 Findlay worked as a delivery architect for Anish Kapoor's monumental ArcelorMittal Orbit for the London Olympics. Findlay was also made an Honorary Fellow of the Royal Incorporation of Architects in Scotland on 11 September 2013.

Just hours before her death on 10 January 2014, Findlay was awarded the 2014 Jane Drew Prize 'for her outstanding contribution to the status of women in architecture'.
