= Victoria and Albert Museum Spiral =

Proposed museum extension

Coordinates: 51.4967°N 0.1733°W

Architect's impression of The Spiral

The Victoria and Albert Museum Spiral (or V&A Spiral, or The Spiral) was a proposed extension of the 19th-century London building which houses the Victoria and Albert Museum, the world's largest museum of decorative arts. It was designed by Daniel Libeskind and the designer, artist, and writer Cecil Balmond. The museum chose the design over seven others in competition in 1996, but after much controversy and failing three times to attract the necessary funding, the project was abandoned in 2004.

When the design was chosen in 1996, Libeskind was relatively unknown, but in 1999 he won international acclaim for the Jewish Museum Berlin, and his master plan for the World Trade Center site in New York has made him a household name there.
