= Cecil Balmond =

Sri Lankan designer, artist, and writer

- සෙසිල් බැල්මන්ඩ්
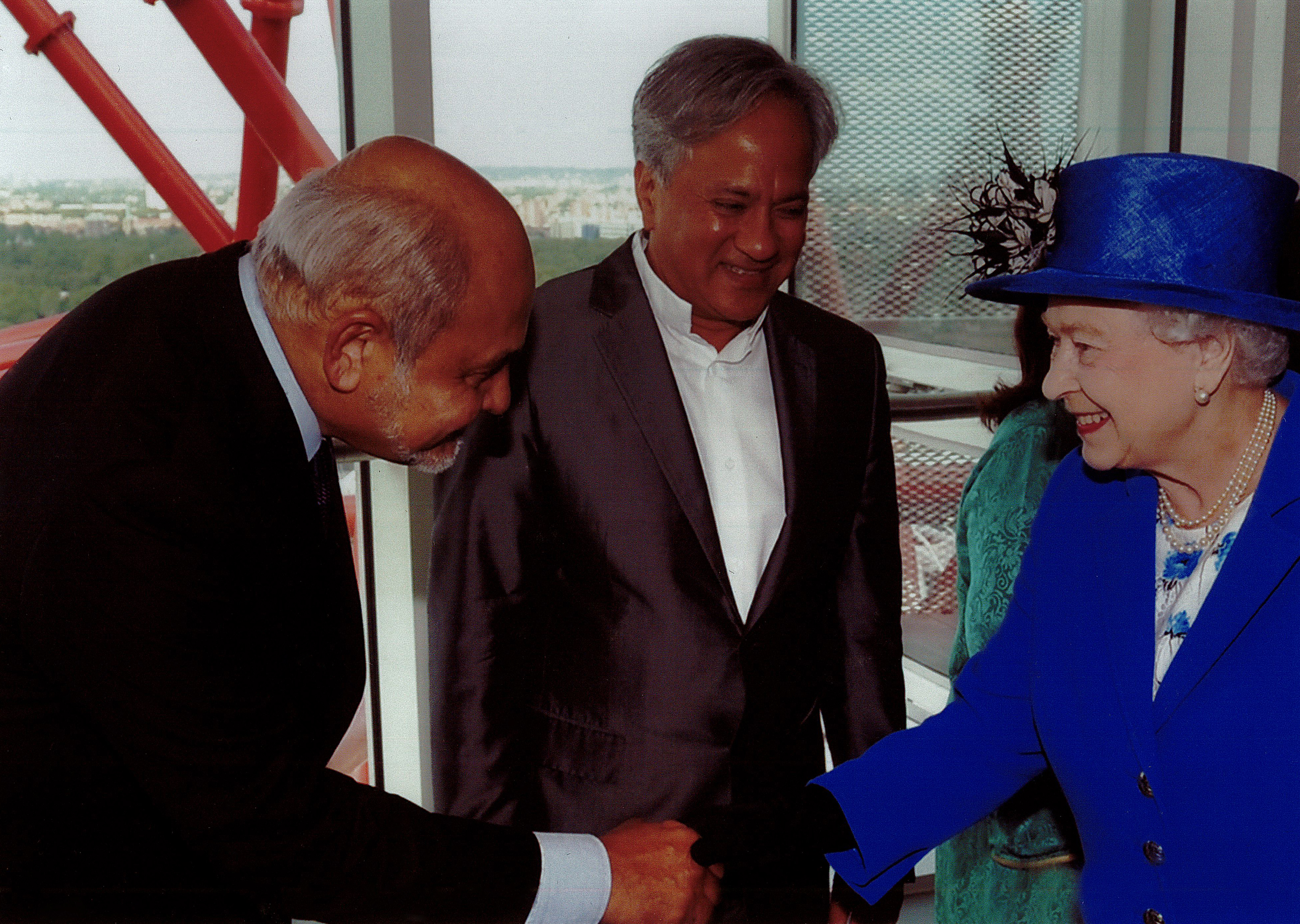
- Balmond (left), Anish Kapoor (centre), and Queen Elizabeth II (right) at the ArcelorMittal Orbit, 2017
- Born: 1943 (age 82–83); Colombo, Sri Lanka
- Education: University of Ceylon; University of Southampton; Imperial College London
- Occupations: Architect; Structural engineer Writer
- Awards: Thomas Jefferson Foundation Medal in Architecture (2016)
- Practice: Ove Arup & Partners, Balmond Studio
- Buildings: Ito-Balmond Serpentine Pavilion; CCTV Headquarters; City of Dreams Sri Lanka
- Projects: Pedro e Inês bridge ArcelorMittal Orbit
- Website: balmondstudio.com

Cecil Balmond OBE is a British Sri Lankan Architect, Structural engineer, artist, and writer. Balmond joined Ove Arup & Partners in 1968 and became deputy chairman of Arup Group in 2003. In 2000 he founded the Advanced Geometry Unit (AGU), a design and research group within Arup. In 2004 he was appointed Paul Philippe Cret Professor of Architecture at the University of Pennsylvania School of Design, where he was the founding director of the Non Linear Systems Organization, a material and structural research unit. He has also been Kenzo Tange Visiting Design Critic at Harvard Graduate School of Architecture (2000), Eero Saarinen Visiting professor at Yale University School of Architecture (1997–2002) and visiting fellow at London School of Economics Urban Cities Programme (2002–2004).

In 2010 Balmond left Arup to set up his own practice, Balmond Studio, based in London; he later also opened an office in Colombo.

He was appointed Officer of the Order of the British Empire (OBE) in the 2015 New Year Honours for services to architecture. In 2016 Balmond was also awarded the Thomas Jefferson Foundation Medal in Architecture by the University of Virginia.

== Education ==
Balmond was born to an Anglo-Irish father and Dutch Sri Lankan mother in Colombo in 1943. He attended Royal College and Trinity College, Kandy. He began studying civil engineering at the University of Ceylon in Colombo and then spent several years in Nigeria, where his father had taken up a post. He moved to England, where he studied civil engineering at the University of Southampton (1962–1965) and later did postgraduate work at Imperial College London.

== Philosophy ==
Balmond sees his work as an open-ended visual application of theory, following the principle that "structure as conceptual rigour is architecture". His approach to structure is derived by theories of complexity, non-linear organisation and emergence. Through his research, Balmond investigates mathematical concepts and their influence on natural forms and structures, interrogating algorithms, fractals, rhythm and cellular structure.

== Works ==
=== Ove Arup & Partners ===
Balmond was deputy chairman at Arup. The AGU at Arup brought together architects, mathematicians, programmers, artists, musicians and scientists. It investigated structural systems, delving in the basin of order and patterns and engaging with music, algorithms, and malignant cellular structure to create abstract concepts that inspired tectonic forms. Under Balmond's artistic direction at the AGU, Balmond worked on some of the world's most famous structures including the Centre Pompidou-Metz with Shigeru Ban and CCTV Headquarters with Rem Koolhaas.

=== Serpentine Gallery ===
Balmond has also been a creative force behind London's Serpentine Pavilion programme. The Ito-Balmond Serpentine Pavilion, 2002 was crafted in glass and white-painted aluminium and featured a scatter of lines, the product of an algorithm designed by Balmond. The pavilion is now located at a luxury hotel in South of France. Balmond also designed pavilions with Daniel Libeskind (2001), Alvaro Siza and Eduardo Souto de Moura (2005) and Rem Koolhaas (2006).

=== Balmond Studio ===
Balmond set up his own studio and workshop in London 2010. Balmond's own designs are numerous and include Weave Bridge, a bridge for University of Pennsylvania (2010), the Pedro e Inês bridge in Coimbra (2006) and a $400m mixed-use development in Asia.

The Orbit

The ArcelorMittal Orbit is designed by Balmond and Anish Kapoor. It is a 120m high sculpture designed for the 2012 Olympics in Stratford, London. Balmond also collaborated with Kapoor on Marsyas a sculpture which was displayed in Tate Modern Turbine Hall (2002), and also co-designed the Tees Valley Giants art installations with Kapoor. Other key works by Balmond include a radical masterplan for Battersea Power Station (2006) and the Victoria & Albert Museum extension with Daniel Libeskind (1996).

Freedom Sculpture

The Freedom Sculpture is a stainless steel gold and silver monument located on Santa Monica Boulevard in a publicly accessible median at Century City, Los Angeles, California.

== Projects ==
=== Architecture ===
- 1970–1973 Carlsberg Brewery, Northampton, UK. Architect, Knud Munk
- 1975 Qatar University, Doha, Qatar. Architect, Kamal Kafrawi
- 1978 -1984 Staatsgalerie Stuttgart, Germany. Architect, James Stirling
- 1983 Royal London House, Finsbury, London. Architect, Sheppard Robson
- 1985 1 Poultry, London UK Architect, James Stirling, Michael Wilford and Associates
- 1988–1992 Museo Thyssen-Bornemisza, Madrid Spain. Architect, Rafael Moneo
- 1989 Congrexpo, Lille France. Architect, OMA
- 1992 -1999 Abando Passenger Interchange, Bilbao, Spain. Architect, James Stirling, Michael Wilford and Associates
- 1994 Kunsthal, Rotterdam, Netherlands. Architect, OMA
- 1995–1998 Pavilion of Portugal in Expo'98, Lisbon. Architect, Alvaro Siza and Eduardo Souto de Moura
- 1996 Victoria & Albert Museum, Spiral, London. Architect, Daniel Libeskind in collaboration with Cecil Balmond
- 1997 Centraal station, Arnhem, Netherlands. Architect, UNStudio
- 1997–2001 Imperial War Museum North, Salford, UK. Architect, Daniel Libeskind
- 1998 Portuguese National Pavilion Expo 1998, Lisbon, Portugal. Architect: Alvaro Siza and Eduardo Souto de Moura
- 1998 Maison a Bordeaux, France. Architect, OMA
- 1999 University of Graz Music School, Austria. Architect, UNStudio
- 1999–2004 Seattle Central Library, USA. Architect, OMA/LMN Architects
- 1999 Casa da Musica, Porto, Portugal. Architect OMA (2005)
- 2000 Portuguese Pavilion Expo 2000, Hannover, Germany. Architect Alvaro Siza and Eduardo Souto de Moura
- 2000 Prada, Los Angeles, CA USA. Architect, OMA (2004)
- 2001 Serpentine Pavilion, London UK. Architect Daniel Libeskind with Arup
- 2002 St Francois d'Assise. Olivier Messiaen stage design and costumes. Daniel Libeskind with Thore Garbers. Artistic consulting, Cecil Balmond
- 2002 Serpentine Pavilion, London. Architect Toyo Ito with Balmond
- 2002 Marsyas, Tate Modern, London. Sculptor Anish Kapoor
- 2003 Battersea Power Station Masterplan, London.
- 2003 Grand Egyptian Museum, Giza, Cairo. Architect, Heneghan Peng Architects
- 2002–2008 China Central Television Headquarters, Beijing (CCTV). Architect, OMA
- 2002 Installation of Louis Vuitton, Tokyo, Japan. Architect, Farjadi Architects
- 2002 British Pavilion, Venice Art Biennale. Design Chris Ofili with AGU and Adjaye/Associates
- 2004–2009 Centre Pompidou-Metz, France. Architect Shigeru Ban, Jean de Gastines and Philip Gumuchdjian
- 2004 St Louis Forest Park, MO USA. Architect Shigeru Ban with Cecil Balmond
- 2004–2006 Pedro e Inês bridge, Mondego River. Coimbra, Portugal. Design Cecil Balmond/AGU with Antonio Adao da Fonseca/AFA
- 2005 Serpentine Pavilion, London. Alvaro Siza and Eduardo Souto de Moura with Cecil Balmond
- 2006 Taichung Metropolitan Opera House, Taichung, Taiwan. Architect Toyo Ito and Associates
- 2006 Serpentine Pavilion, London. Rem Koolhaas and Cecil Balmond
- 2007 Tees Valley Giants, UK. Cable Net Sculpture, Middlehaven. Artist Anish Kapoor and Cecil Balmond
- 2007 Hotel Le Beauvallon masterplan, Saint-Tropez, France. Architect Cecil Balmond and AGU
- 2008 Institute of the Pen, Medina, Saudi Arabia. Design Cecil Balmond/AGU
- 2009 Weave Bridge, University of Penn. Architect, Cecil Balmond/AGU
- 2017 Freedom Sculpture, Century City, Los Angeles, California

=== Sculpture and public art ===
- Star of Caledonia, public sculpture, England/Scotland border (ongoing)
- Public artwork for the Black Hawk Mini Park Art Project, Iowa City, USA
- Public artwork, CTA Wilson Station, Chicago, Illinois, USA
- Shade structure for the Mesa Arts Center in Mesa, Arizona, USA
- Snow Words, light sculpture, Alaska (completed in 2012)
- net_ Work, sculpture, Canada (completed in 2012)

=== Exhibitions ===
- 2006, Informal, Arc en Reve, Bordeaux France
- 2007 H_edge, Artists Space, New York USA
- 2008 Frontiers of Architecture, Louisiana Museum of Modern Art, Denmark
- 2009 Solid Void, Graham Foundation, Chicago USA
- 2009 Forum 64, Carnegie Museum of Art, Pittsburgh USA
- 2010 Element, Tokyo Opera City Art Gallery, Tokyo Japan

== Bibliography ==
- (1995) Natur und abstraction: lehrstuhl Jose Luis Mateo
- (1996) Unfolding architecture: The Boilerhouse extension
- (1997) New Structure and the Informal
- (Prestel 1998) No 9, The Search for the Sigma Code
- (Prestel 2002) informal
- (2002) Anish Kapoor : Marsyas
- (2002) Serpentine Gallery Pavilion
- (2004) Souto de Moura with Cecil Balmond
- (2004) Concrete Poetry Concrete Architecture in Australia
- (2005) Serpentine Pavilion 2005
- (2006) Serpentine Pavilion 2006
- (2007) Frontiers of Architecture
- (Prestel 2007) Element
- (2008) A+U Cecil Balmond, Special Edition
- (Prestel 2013) Crossover

== Awards ==
- 2002 Gengo Matsui prize, Japan, engineering
- 2003, RIBA Charles Jencks award for Theory in Practice.
- 2005, Sir Banister Fletcher Prize
- 2011, IED Gerald Frewer Memorial Trophy
- 2011, Prince Philip Designers Prize shortlist
- 2013, Snow Words – 50 best US public artworks of 2013, Public Art Network
- 2015, Officer of the Order of the British Empire, Services to Architecture
- 2016, Thomas Jefferson Foundation Medal in Architecture
- 2017, Ada derana Sri Lankan of the year 2017

== Professional associations and teaching ==
=== Professional associations ===
- 1970, Member of the Institution of Structural Engineers
- 1992, Honorary Architectural Association Diploma
- 1998, Honorary Fellow of the Royal Institute of British Architects
- 2009, Honorary Fellow of the Institution of Engineering Designers

=== Teaching ===
- 2000, Visiting Kenzo Tange critic, Harvard Graduate School of Architecture
- 2002–2004, Professor LSE – LSE Cities Programme
- 1997–2002, Visiting Saarinen Professor, Yale University School of Architecture
- 2004, Paul Phillipe, Cret Professor of Architecture, Penn Design
- 2005 to current day, Director, NSO, Penn Design
