= Ushida Findlay Architects =

Architectural practice

Ushida Findlay Architects was an architectural practice originating in Tokyo but now based in London. They are known for their unusual, non-rectilinear, neo-expressionist buildings, including their Soft and Hairy House in Tsukuba (1994). Their starfish-shaped design for a country house at Grafton Hall Estate in Cheshire (2002) was selected in competition but ultimately went unrealised.

The practice were architects for the ArcelorMittal Orbit tower, the UK's tallest sculpture, providing architectural design to transform it into a functional building.

== History ==
Ushida Findlay was originated in Japan, set up in 1986 by husband and wife team, Eisaku Ushida and Kathryn Findlay. They came to the UK in 1999, setting up the practice in Edinburgh. However, the couple split-up and the company experienced financial difficulties, filing bankruptcy in 2004. Findlay launched her own separate practice.

The practice worked on York Art Gallery.

== Notable projects ==
- Echo Chamber, Tokyo
- Truss Wall House, Tokyo (1993)
- Soft and Hairy House, Tsukuba (1994)
- ArcelorMittal Orbit Tower, Olympic Park, London (2011)
