= Star of Caledonia =

Sculpture project in Dumfries and Galloway, Scotland

- Artist's impression of the Star of Caledonia at night
- Interactive map of Star of Caledonia
- Location: Gretna, Dumfries and Galloway, Scotland
- Coordinates: 54.998383°N 3.054854°W
- Designer: Cecil Balmond and Charles Jencks
- Type: Star
- Material: steel frame lit by LEDs

The Star of Caledonia, also called the Gretna Landmark, is a planned sculpture designed by Cecil Balmond and Charles Jencks. It is to be located near Gretna, Dumfries and Galloway, Scotland, close to the England-Scotland border. The sculpture was approved on 27 February 2013.

== Background ==
The project was first instigated by local businesses and landowner Alasdair Houston. Other interested parties included both Gretna and Gretna Green and public art manager Jan Hogarth. It is hoped that the sculpture will attract visitors, boosting tourism, and result in social and economic benefits to the area.

About 84% of all visitors to Scotland by road pass near Gretna. For the past seven years, meetings have been held with Scottish academics, cultural thinkers and the local community in a series of seminars and workshops run by the Gretna Landmark Project which resulted in the appointment of international architect Charles Jencks as the Trust's Creative Director. In 2011 a competition was launched by the Gretna Landmark Trust called "The Great Unknown" as a way to get ideas for a new local iconic landmark. Three shortlisted artists and designers collaborated with Jencks on proposals for the landmark. In July 2011 it was announced that Cecil Balmond had won the competition with the Star of Caledonia design. Planning permission was first proposed in 2012. A debate on the proposal was later held in the Scottish National Gallery in Edinburgh in October 2011 by the two artists.

It was also hoped that the sculpture would be built in early 2014, in time for both the 2014 Commonwealth Games and 2014 Homecoming Scotland, and only taking a year to build. However, the projected date then slipped to 2015, which had been designated the UNESCO International Year of Light, although this target was also missed. In March 2026, it was announced that construction would begin in June of that year, with a projected completion date of August 2027.

== Funding ==
The initial design was expected to cost £3.8 million but this has since risen to £4.8 million. In 2011 Creative Scotland awarded the project £1 million from its capitals investment programme towards its development. However the project has failed to secure further commitments of public funding, leading to Creative Scotland withdrawing its £1 million support and putting the project further into question. In May 2019, a three-year planning extension was granted allowing the team behind the sculpture more time to secure funding. Half of the ultimate project cost of £12 million was eventually secured through agreement with energy firm CWP Energy.

== Location ==
The sculpture is to be located in a field opposite the Gretna Gateway Outlet Village, located on the outskirts of the town of Gretna in Scotland. The sculpture will be visible from the nearby A74(M) motorway. Instead of using road signs, the surrounding landscape is to be used as a way to recognise it and to turn crossing the border into a memorable experience. It will also not be far from the River Sark.

== Design ==
Estimates of the height of the sculpture range from 40 metres (130 ft) to 55 metres (180 ft) projected to be twice the size of the Angel of the North. The design is meant to pay homage to innovation within Scotland and be inspired by inventors and innovators, in particular prominent Scottish physicist James Clerk Maxwell, who was famous for his work in electromagnetic theory. It was revealed in 2026 that due to funding and planning difficulties, the sculpture's height had been reduced.

The sculpture is to be in a star shape and to be made of galvanised steel and illuminated at night at its tips using "subtle lighting". The lights will be using LEDs, although the light emissions will be explored in more detail as part of the approval by the council.

The sculpture intends to pull together the surrounding hills, the adjacent site and the Solway. The Gretna Landmark Trust have said that the sculpture's aim was to be "visually spectacular but meaningful, relating strongly to place and identity".

== Reception ==
Although no objection occurred to the planning application, the design and proposal of the Star of Caledonia has received a mixed reception. The design has been supported by author Ian Rankin who has described it as futuristic and forward looking. A Scottish politician has also described it as fitting, in such an iconic location, novel and inspirational. It is also supported by local businesses including the Gretna Gateway Outlet Village.

However, there has been some criticism by local artists and some architectural firms

The sculpture was subsequently included in a campaign to raise awareness of James Clerk Maxwell.

Research has claimed the sculpture could be worth £16 million in its first year. In an external impact assessment carried out by BOP Consulting on behalf of Dumfries and Galloway Council and public art development company Wide Open, it found that the Star of Caledonia could bring in £2 million from construction, £4 million a year from tourism, up to £10 million in national and international publicity in the first four months and £300,000 locally. The sculpture is expected to attract 70,000 people a year when built.

In August 2014, the sculpture received the backing of United Kingdom MP Helen Grant.
