= Dreamweaver (disambiguation) =

Adobe Dreamweaver is a web development tool developed by Adobe Systems.

Dreamweaver or Dream Weaver(s) may also refer to:

== Music ==
- The Dream Weavers, a 1950s pop music singing group
- Dream Weaver (album), a 1966 album by Charles Lloyd
- Dreamweaver (Sabbat album), 1989
- Dreamweaver (George Duke album), 2013
- Dreamweaver, an album by Golem
- The Dream Weaver, a 1975 album by Gary Wright
- "Dream Weaver", a song by Gary Wright from The Dream Weaver (1975)
- "Dream Weaver", a song by REO Speedwagon from This Time We Mean It
- "Dreamweaver", a song by Stratovarius from Elements Pt. 2

== Other uses ==
- T'nalak dreamweavers, traditional weavers of t'nalak cloth of the T'boli people, the designs of which are inspired by dreams
- Dreamweaver, a type of fictional character in the fantasy novel trilogy Age of the Five
- Dream Weavers (anthology), a 1996 fantasy anthology
- "Dream Weaver" (King of the Hill), an episode of King of the Hill
- "Dream Weaver" (seaQuest DSV), an episode of seaQuest DSV
- "Dream Weaver" (Supergirl), an episode of Supergirl
- Dream Weavers, a home world in the video game Spyro the Dragon
- Dreamweaver, a wheat beer brewed by Tröegs Brewing Company
