= Weave (consultancy) =

weave
- Company type: Private
- Industry: Consulting in augmented strategy
- Founded: 2001
- Founder: Didier Rousseau
- Headquarters: Incorporated Headquarters in Paris, France
- Key people: Didier Rousseau, President & CEO
- Number of employees: 420
- Website: weave.eu

weave is a French company which provides operational strategy consulting services. In 2011, weave became the first French consulting firm to obtain European Foundation for Quality Management (EFQM) recognition. Weave is also a member of the French Association for Management Progress (APM) as well as the Syntec Federation.

== History ==
Didier Rousseau founded weave in 2001 to provide consulting services in operational strategy, focusing on the manufacturing industry and the food sector. The same year, weave launched its first subsidiary, Airmis, offering management and IT consultancy. In the year of its launch in 2001, weave experienced rapid growth. That year, the firm also launched its dedicated Energy Industry Services department. In 2002 weave developed a Business Technology offering.

The arrival of Eric Delannoy and Alexandre Meyer in 2005 led to the launch of a portfolio of solutions for the banking & insurance sector.

In 2006 weave created a subsidiary, WHumanRessources, offering recruiting services. Company acquire O2 France, a French sustainable development and eco-design consultancy, and also to set up AIR, in conjunction with Catherine Ronge, one of the firm's original founders.

In 2011, weave became the first French consulting firm to obtain EFQM (European Foundation For Quality Management) recognition, achieving the highest level: Recognized for Excellence 5 star. This award was renewed in 2015.

In 2014, the independent private equity firm NiXEN Partners acquired a 60% stake in weave, making it the majority shareholder. The second largest stake is owned by weaver Chairman & CEO Didier Rousseau, and the remaining 16% equity is held by 32 associates.

In 2018, OnePoint acquired 100% of the company shares from weave's partners and NIXEN for €120 million. The new organization now counts 2,300 employees in Europe, North Africa, North America and Singapore for an expected turnover of €300 million.
