= Centraalstaal =

Dutch architecture and shipbuilding company

Central Industry Group (CIG)
- Industry: Shipbuilding, Maritime design
- Founded: 1972
- Founder: Shipyards in the north of the Netherlands
- Headquarters: Groningen
- Website: https://www.centralindustrygroup.com/

Centraalstaal BV or rather CIG Centraalstaal is a Dutch company, with headquarters in Groningen, Netherlands. It is part of Central Industry Group (CIG) a group of nine autonomous companies under two separate corporate umbrellas, located in the northern part of Germany and the Netherlands, and owned by the investment company Nimbus.

Centraalstaal is currently internationally active in the shipbuilding industry, the architecture industry and the art industry.

== History ==
=== Foundation of Centraalstaal ===
In the early 1970s the Dutch shipbuilding industry was under severe pressure from foreign competition. One of the challenges faced by the small shipyards in the north of the Netherlands were the huge investments that were required for modern production technologies. In these circumstances several of these shipyards decided to cooperate with each other in order to obtain a stronger position in the international shipbuilding industry. A result of this cooperation was the decision to cut production costs by starting a company that would provide prefabricated (precut and preformed) steel to the shipyards, thereby eliminating the necessity for each shipyard to invest in expensive prefabrication equipment. In 1972 this resulted in the creation of a prefabrication factory and head office in the city of Groningen, which became known by the name of Centraalstaal BV. Centraalstaal initially started as a pre-processing plant with the sole purpose to support the shipbuilding industry in the north of the Netherlands.

=== Central Industry Group ===
In 1977 the Central Industry Group was formed. It was a holding company which owned Centraalstaal and soon grew to 10 companies that offered a wide range of services to the international shipbuilding industry. These included engineering services, engineering, software development, ship's equipment and steel prefabrication.

On most projects, in both the shipbuilding and the architecture industry, Centraalstaal worked together in close coordination with sister companies Numeriek Centrum Groningen and Vuyk Engineering Groningen for the engineering work that precedes the manufacturing process. Both companies are part of the Central Industry Group.

Positive market conditions and a growing demand for Centraalstaal's services from outside the Netherlands resulted in the creation of two sister companies. In 1998, Ostseestaal GMBH was set up in Stralsund, Germany, in order to be able to cope with the demand coming from the German and East European markets. In 2008, Centraalstaal India Steel Pvt Ltd. was started in Hangarkatta, India, to cover the Asian market. The three Centraalstaal companies were independent from each other but were all part of the Central Industry Group and worked together on joint projects under the banner of Centraalstaal International (CSI).

=== Disentanglement of CIG ===
The 2008 financial crisis resulted in a major shipping downturn. It struck the shipyards in the north of the Netherlands and in turn CIG Centraalstaal was affected. For some years it survived by going into the architecture and art- markets, but in the long run these markets proved too small for the production capacity of Centraalstaal. Another problem was that shipyards increasingly opted to buy their metal parts elsewhere. This might have had to do with prices, but also with souring relations because Centraalstaal had started her own shipping line.

In 2017 Centraalstaal still had 120 employees. A first reorganization let to 35 lay-offs. A second reorganization in 2016 brought the number of employees back to 50. In November 2016 the holding Central Industry Group (CIG) asked for an automatic stay for herself and daughter CIG Shipbuilding. At that moment all CIG companies still had 230 employees, and a solution was expected to be found. Indeed, the investment company Nimbus announced that it would buy all 13 daughter companies of SIG only a few days later.

=== 2019 Situation ===
After the take-over by Nimbus CIG became a group of nine autonomous companies under two separate corporate umbrellas, located in the northern part of Germany and the Netherlands. The companies are autonomous and there are few cross-bondings. Indeed, some German operations seem to have become totally independent. SEC Bremen is still a leading manufacturer of container lashing equipment. Ostseestahl and Ampereship, both in Stralsund seem to prosper and expand. All these do not refer to CIG publicly. On the other hand, CIG Piping Technology in Bremen still uses the CIG name.

The Dutch part of the holding still uses the name Central Industry Group. It uses company names CIG Centraalstaal, CIG Architecture and DEKC Maritime (previously Vuyk Engineering Groningen). All these are based in the old Central Industry Group office in Groningen. In September 2019 CIG International divested THR Marine, a company specialized in the design, manufacture, installation and maintenance of winches, anchors and mooring equipment.

=== 2021 ===
On June 4. 2021, Centraalstaal filed for an automatic stay (surseance van betaling)). The company filed for bankruptcy a few days later on June 7. 2021.

== Activities of CIG Centraalstaal ==
=== Shipbuilding industry ===
Since the start of the company in 1972, Centraalstaal provides prefabricated 'building kits' to the international shipbuilding industry. These building kits consist of an assortment of precut and preformed plates and profiles that are used by shipyards in order to assemble the hull and the superstructure of a ship. Although the company's main customer base is in the Netherlands, Centraalstaal has delivered prefabricated steel to approximately 150 shipyards worldwide.

=== Architecture industry ===
Centraalstaal is active in the architecture industry as a manufacturing and engineering partner to architects and construction companies for the construction of building façades and structures involving three dimensionally shaped metal plates. Since 2003, the company has worked on a wide range of different projects on both a national and an international level. For the production of the metal plates Centraalstaal uses production methods and construction methods that are directly adopted from the shipbuilding industry.

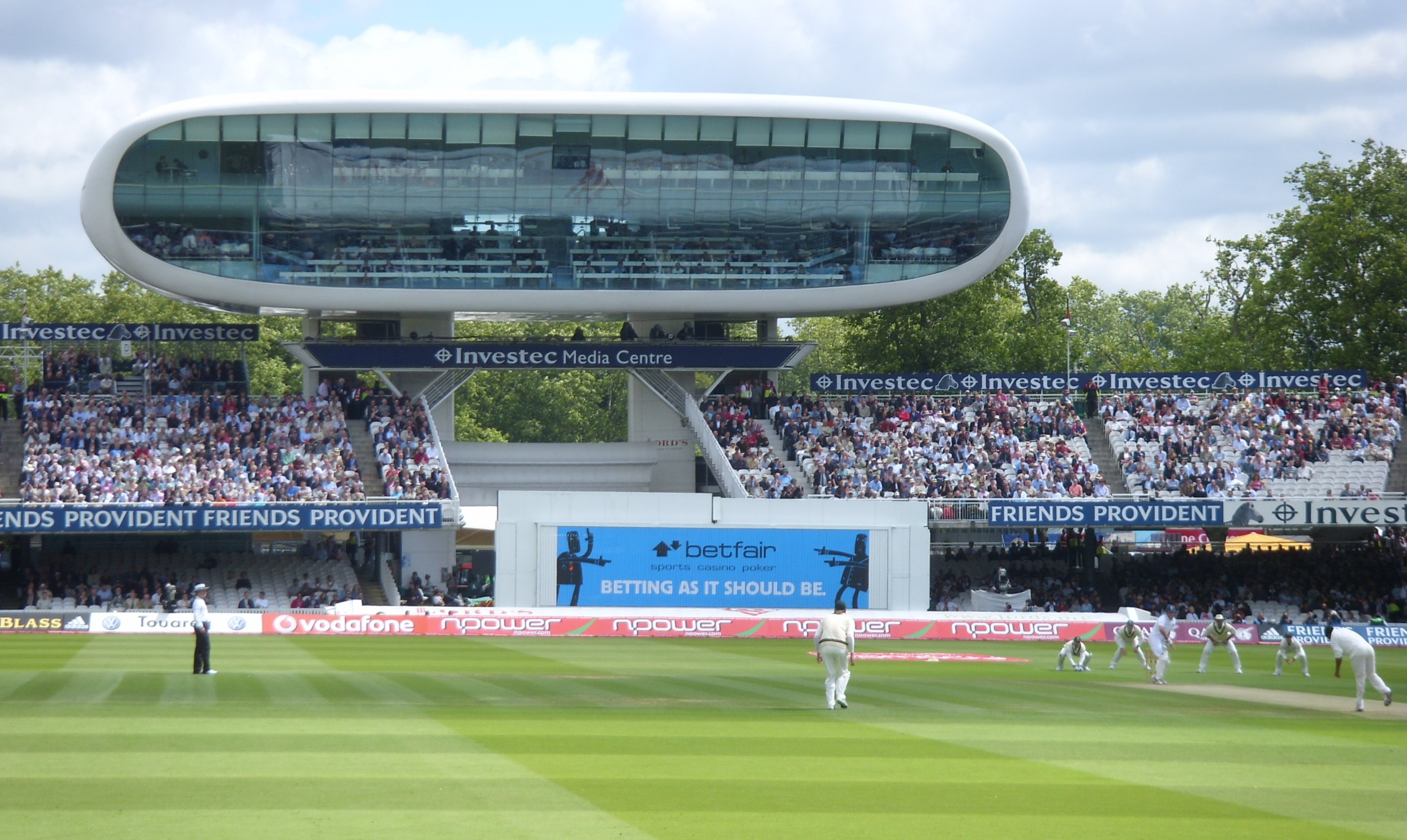
Lord's Media Centre, London

The Sidra Trees structure of the Convention Center in Doha, Qatar.

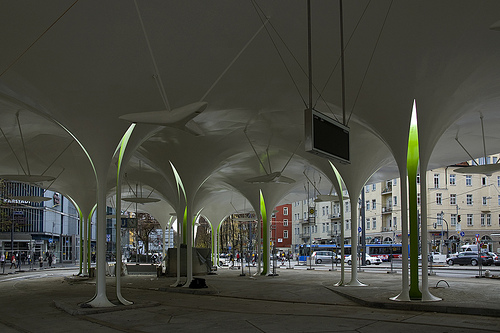
The Münchner Freiheit station in München, Germany.

Project	Place	Architect	Year
Lord's Media Centre	London, United Kingdom	Future Systems London / Amanda Levete	2003
Millenium Square Mast	London, United Kingdom	Tuchschmid Switzerland	2005
BMW Ekris	Utrecht, Netherlands	ONL Oosterhuis	2006
F-Zuid Amsterdam	Amsterdam, Netherlands	ONL Oosterhuis- Lénárd Rotterdam	2007
Ozeaneum Stralsund	Stralsund, Germany	Benisch Architects	2008
Sidra Trees	Doha, Qatar	RHWL Architects London	2009
Connection Bridge Marina Hotel	Abu Dhabi, UAE	Asymptote New York	2009
Münchner Freiheit Bussbahnhof	München, Germany	OX2 Architects	2009
CET Building	Budapest, Hungary	ONL Oosterhuis – Lénárd Rotterdam	2010
Naples metro Universita / Traiano	Naples, Italy	Anish Kapoor / Future Systems London / Amanda Levete	2010

=== Art industry ===
Centraalstaal has been active in the art industry as a manufacturer of works of art consisting of 3D shaped metal plates. The most notable artworks that Centraalstaal has produced are the 'Hive' and the 'Memory' sculptures designed by London-based artist Anish Kapoor. The 'Memory' sculpture has been on display in the Guggenheim Museum of Berlin and is currently on display in the Guggenheim Museum in New York. The 'Hive' sculpture has been on display in the Royal Academy of Arts in London. Both sculptures were made out of Cor-Ten steel'.
