= Manuel Blasco de Nebra =

Spanish organist and composer (1750–1784)

Manuel Orlandi Blasco de Nebra (2 May 1750 – 12 September 1784) was a Spanish organist and composer who lived in Seville.

He was the son of José Blasco de Nebra (Lacarra), the organist of Seville Cathedral since 1735, and became his assistant organist in 1768, taking over in 1778. He was renowned for his excellent sight-reading and playing of the organ, harpsichord and fortepiano, of which some impression can be obtained from his surviving compositions. During his short life (he predeceased his father), he composed about 170 works, although only 30, all for keyboard instrument, are still in existence.

Six sonatas were recovered and edited by musicologist Robert Parris from the first edition of the ''Sonatas'', ''Op.1'', held at the Library of Congress in Washington. Another twelve sonatas and the six pastorellas were found at the Monastery of Montserrat (Catalonia), which have since been published by Egtved in an edition by the Danish musicologist Bengt Johnsson. Later still, María Inmaculada Cárdenas Serván discovered a further six sonatas at the Encarnación Monastery of Osuna (in the province of Seville), which she published with the support of the Spanish Musicology Society. Two other sonatas come from a manuscript found and studied by Pedro Casals at the Santa Clara convent in Seville, which is now held at Madrid's Universidad Complutense. A modern edition of these two pieces has yet to be published.

- Seis sonatas para clave y fuerte-piano op.1 (Madrid, 1780)
- six pastorellas and 12 sonatas (manuscript of Montserrat)
- six keyboard sonatas (Osuna, Encarnación Monastery)

== Discography ==
- Blasco de Nebra: Works for Keyboard by Josep Colom, Mandala /Harmonia Mundi, 1995.
- Blasco de Nebra: Piano Sonatas by Javier Perianes, Harmonia Mundi / IODA, 2010.
- Blasco de Nebra: Complete Keyboard Sonatas Vol 1 by Pedro Casals, Naxos 2009.
- Blasco de Nebra: Complete Keyboard Sonatas Vol 2 by Pedro Casals, Naxos 2010.
- Blasco de Nebra: Complete Keyboard Sonatas Vol 3 by Pedro Casals, Naxos 2010.
- Blasco de Nebra: Complete Piano Works, Vol. 1 by Pedro Piquero, Columna Música, 2009.
- Blasco de Nebra: Complete Piano Works, Vol. 2 by Pedro Piquero, Columna Música, 2010.
- Blasco de Nebra: Complete Piano Works, Vol. 3 by Pedro Piquero, Columna Música, 2011.
- Blasco de Nebra: Complete Piano Works, (3 CDs) by Pedro Piquero, Brilliant Classics, 2025

== Sources ==
- José López-Calo: 'Blasco de Nebra (Orlandi), Manuel', Grove Music Online ed. L. Macy (Accessed 2007-05-23), http://www.grovemusic.com/
- Notes with cd recording by Pedro Casals, April 2009
