= Tröegs =

Pennsylvania brewery

- Location: Hershey, Pennsylvania; (40°17.832′N 76°38.5812′W)
- Opened: 1996
- Annual production volume: 101,000 US beer barrels (119,000 hL) in 2017.
- Owned by: John Trogner and Chris Trogner

Active beers
Name	Type
DreamWeaver	Hefeweizen
Hopback	Amber Ale
JavaHead	Stout
LaGrave	Triple Golden Ale
Jovial	Belgian Dubbel Ale
Troegenator	Double Bock
Solid Sender	Pale Ale
Perpetual	Imperial Pale Ale

Seasonal beers
Name	Type
Blizzard of Hops (November - January)	White India Pale Ale
Cultivator (February - April)	Helles Bock
Hop Knife (August - October)	India Pale Ale
Mad Elf Ale (October release)	Belgian Strong Ale
Master of Pumpkins (September release)	Pumpkin ale
Nimble Giant (June release)	Double IPA
Nugget Nectar (January release)	Imperial Amber Ale
Sunshine Pils (April - July)	Pilsner

Tröegs is an American brewery located on Hersheypark Drive in Hershey, Pennsylvania. John and Chris Trogner founded the company in 1996. Tröegs is a craft-brewery, or microbrewery focusing their production on specialty and seasonal beers. Tröegs also is a limited distribution brewery, only distributing beer to states within proximity to maintain beer freshness.

== History ==
Tröegs was founded in 1996 in Harrisburg, Pennsylvania, by brothers John and Chris Trogner. The name Tröegs is a combination of a nickname derived from the surname Trogner and the Dutch word kroeg ("pub"). The 'o' carries a gratuitous umlaut as an exercise in foreign branding. The brewery was originally located at 800 Paxton Street in Harrisburg. Their first keg was sold to a Harrisburg restaurant in July, 1997.

Tröegs began construction of their new brewery in 2010 and moved from Harrisburg to Hershey in Fall 2011. Grand opening celebrations were held during November of that year. At approximately 90,000 square feet (8,400 m^{2}) the new brewery is about three times the size of the original facility and includes a tap house (tasting room) with a full view of the brewhouse. The tap house bar serves most beer by the glass, although a select few, including "corked-and-caged" beers, are sold by the bottle. Most of Tröegs' beers are available "to go"—as 4-packs, 6-packs, cases, growlers, and, most recently, as "crowlers" (32-US-fluid-ounce (950 ml) aluminum cans filled from a tap and then sealed; a portmanteau of "can" and "growler"). However, a few bottled beers have been available for consumption only in the tap room. The tap room also features an upscale "snack bar."

Every year, Tröegs is one of the sponsors of Harrisburg Beer Week with proceeds benefiting the Harrisburg River Rescue & Emergency Services. Held every year, it's a 10-day, multi-venue series showcasing breweries, restaurants, pubs and more through craft beer-centric events, demonstrations, and education throughout the greater Harrisburg area.

Self-guided tours are available daily during regular business hours. Guided tasting tours are also available by appointment.

In 2012, Tröegs produced 44,000 US beer barrels (52,000 hl); by 2016, the volume had more than doubled to 89,000 US beer barrels (104,000 hl).

== Beers ==
Tröegs currently has sixteen beers in regular production. These are split between year-round and seasonal offerings. Seasonal beers are further split between "once a year" and "hop cycle," the latter being an annual rotation of hoppy beers.

Name	Style	Production	ABV	IBUs	Color	Malts	Hops	Yeast	Notes
Blizzard Of Hops	Winter IPA	Hop Cycle: November–January	6.4%	80	6	Pilsner, Unmalted Wheat, White Wheat	Centennial, Chinook, El Dorado	Ale	
Blood Orange Cranberry	Tart	Once a Year: October	4.5%		3	Honey Malt, Malted Wheat, Pilsner, Vienna Malt		Hornindal Kveik	
DreamWeaver	Wheat Ale	Year Round	4.8%	15	4	Pilsner, Vienna	German Northern Brewer	German Wheat	55% Wheat
Double Blizzard	Double IPA	Once a Year: December	8.3%		4	Pilsner, Unmalted Wheat, White Wheat	Centennial, Chinook, El Dorado, Galaxy	House Ale	
Double Nugget	Double Imperial Amber Ale	Once a Year: January–February	9.5%			Azacca, Columbus, Nugget, Simcoe	Ale		
Field Study	IPA	Hop Cycle: April–July	6.2%		4	Oats, Pilsner, Rustic Pale, Wheat	Citra, Mosaic, El Dorado	House Ale	
Grand Cacao	Chocolate Stout	Year Round	6.5%		30	Pilsner, Munich, Caramel, Chocolate, Special B, Roasted Barley, Oats	Galena	House Ale	
Haze Charmer	Hazy Pale Ale	Year Round	5.5%		4	Honey Malt, Malted Wheat, Oats, Pale Malt, Unmalted Wheat	Citra, El Dorado, Lotus, Mosaic	London 3	
Hop Cyclone	Double IPA	Once a Year: August	9.2%		9	Pilsner, Wheat, Vienna, Unmalted Wheat	Citra, Sabro, Sultana, Simcoe	London 3	
Hop Horizon	IPA	Hop Cycle: February–April	6.5%		6	Pilsner, Munich, Pale, Oats, Wheat	Citra, Mosaic, Sabro	London 3	
LaGrave	Triple golden ale	Year Round	8.0%	31	6	Pilsner	German Northern Brewer	Abbey ale	contains cane sugar. Tröegs' first corked-and-caged release
Lollihop	Double IPA	Once a Year: March	8.2%		4	Oats, Rustic Pale, Wheat	Azacca, Citra, Mosaic	House Ale	
Lucky Holler	Winter IPA	Hop Cycle: July–November	6.8%		3	Malted Oats, Pale, Unmalted Wheat, White Wheat	Citra, Galaxy, Simcoe	London 3	
Jovial	Belgian Dubbel Ale	Year Round	7.0%	13	24.5	Abbey, Chocolate, Munich, Pilsner	Crystal, Magnum	Abbey Ale	
The Mad Elf	Ale	October release	11.0%	15	14	Pilsner, Munich, Chocolate	Saaz, Hallertau	Spicy Belgian	contains honey, sweet and sour cherries
Mad Elf Grand Cru		Once a Year: November–December	11.0%		14	Chocolate, Munich, Pilsner		Spicy Belgian	
Master of Pumpkins	Pumpkin Ale	September release	7.5%	30	24.5	Pilsner, Munich, Special B	German northern brewer	Belgian saison	brewed with locally grown neck pumpkins
Nimble Giant	Double IPA	June release	9%	69	15		Azacca, mosaic, simcoe		
Nugget Nectar	Ale	January release	7.5%	93	9	Pilsner, Vienna, Munich	Nugget, Warrior, Tomahawk, Simcoe, Palisade	Ale	
Oktoberfest	Lager	Once a Year: July–August				malts	hops	yeast	
Perpetual	IPA	Year Round	7.5%	85	6	Pilsner, Crystal, Munich	Bravo, Chinook, Mt. Hood, Nugget, Citra, Cascade	Ale	
Perpetual Haze	Hazy IPA	Once a Year: May				malts	hops	yeast	
Raspberry Lime	Tart	Once a Year: April	4.5%			Pilsner, Vienna, Wheat	Tradition	Hornindal Kveik	
Sunshine Pils	Pils	Year Round	4.5%	45	2	Pilsner, Crystal	Saaz, Hallertau Mitt.	Lager	
Trail Day	Dry-hopped pilsner	Once a Year: May	5.2%		Pale Gold	German Pilsner	German Northern Brewer, Tradition	House Lager	
Troegenator	Double Bock	Year Round	8.2%	25	18	Pilsner, Munich, Chocolate	Magnum, German Northern Brewer	Lager	spelled without the decorative umlaut over the 'o'. Named after Trogdor, the burninator.

=== "Scratch" beers ===
Tröegs also produces "Scratch" beers, an experimental series focusing on new techniques and non-traditional ingredients. These are available on a limited basis (often for only a few days or weeks) and have included weizenbocks, lagers, and barleywines, as well as barrel-aged beers. As of November 2020, over 425 beers have been offered as part of the Scratch Beer series. Several later entered regular production.

=== Canned beers ===
In late 2013 Tröegs began limited production of canned beers. Previously, Tröegs had only distributed its beer in kegs and glass bottles. As of December 2013, Perpetual IPA and Troegenator Double Bock have been made available in cans (12-ounce and 16-ounce cans, respectively).

=== Cork and caged beers ===
In fall 2013 Tröegs introduced its first cork and caged beers. As of August 2016 at least four cork and caged beers have been produced: LaGrave, a Triple Golden Ale; Master of Pumpkins, made with saison yeast and roasted pumpkin; Jovial, a Belgian Dubbel Ale; and Wild Elf, a barrel-aged version of the seasonal Mad Elf. LaGrave and Jovial are part of a year-round production, while Master of Pumpkins is seasonal. Wild Elf, introduced in the summer of 2016, is also the first offering from the Splinter Cellar project

=== "Splinter" beers ===
The "Splinter" series of beers are barrel-aged and (prior to completion of the Splinter Cellar) were produced on a very limited basis.

In mid-2016 Tröegs completed its Splinter Cellar expansion, an addition on the northeast side of the facility. This contains three 20-foot tall wooden fermenters ("foeders") imported from Italy. The addition features a glass exterior, allowing a full view of the foeders from the outside. These have dramatically increased the brewery's capacity to produce wood aged beers. The addition also includes an art gallery and a new entrance for guided tours. As of August 2016, expansion of the outdoor "beer garden" is underway, and parking lot improvements are under consideration. Working on this project are Dave Maule Architects and Pyramid Construction, who were both involved in the Hershey build four years ago.

=== New artwork ===
In late 2015, Tröegs revealed new artwork which would be featured on their beers and packaging. Chris and John Trogner collaborated with Philadelphia-based designer Lindsey Tweed to come up with the fresh new look. Along with the new artwork came a redesigned website and brand new merchandise.

== Awards ==
Year	Award	Presented by	Category	Winning beer
2006	Silver medal	Great American Beer Festival	---	Troegenator
2006	Bronze medal	World Beer Cup	---	Troegenator
2006	Best local beer	Philadelphia Magazine's Best of Philly	---	HopBack
2007	Gold medal	Great American Beer Festival	Bock	Troegenator
2008	Bronze medal	World Beer Cup	German Style Pils	Sunshine Pils
2008	Bronze medal	Great American Beer Festival	Barleywine	Flying Mouflan
2008	Bronze medal	Great American Beer Festival	American Stout	Dead Reckoning
2008	Rated #1	Joe Sixpack's Christmas Beer: The Cheeriest, Tastiest, and Most Unusual Holiday Brews	Christmas beer	Mad Elf
2009	Gold medal	Great American Beer Festival	Bock Category	Troegenator
2009	Silver medal	Great American Beer Festival	American Stout	Dead Reckoning
2009	Bronze medal	Great American Beer Festival	German style Pilsner	Sunshine Pils
2009	1st Place	The Washington Post's Beer Madness	---	HopBack
2010	Gold medal	World Beer Cup	German style Bock	Troegenator
2010	Gold medal	Great American Beer Festival	Barleywine	Flying Mouflan
2010	Silver medal	Great American Beer Festival	American Red Ale	HopBack
2010	Silver medal	Great American Beer Festival	Bock Category	Troegenator
2010	Round one winner	The Washington Post's Beer Madness	---	HopBack
2011	Gold medal	Great American Beer Festival	Bock Category	Troegenator
2011	Silver medal	Great American Beer Festival	German-Style Pilsener	Sunshine Pils
2011	Silver medal	Great American Beer Festival	---	Sunshine Pils
2011	The Fifty Best Beers	The Fifty Best	---	Nugget Nectar
2012	Gold medal	Great American Beer Festival	German-Style Pilsener	Sunshine Pils
2012	Gold medal	Great American Beer Festival	American-style Amber/Red Ale -	HopBack
2012	Gold medal	Great American Beer Festival	South German-Style Hefeweizen	DreamWeaver
2012	Bronze medal	World Beer Cup	German style Bock	Troegenator
2012	Mid-Size Brewing Company and Brewer of the Year	Great American Beer Festival	---	
2012	1st Place	18th Annual United States Beer Tasting Championship (Mid-Atlantic/Southern Region)	Amber/Red Ale	HopBack
2013	Best Lager	Best of the Philly Beer Scene	Lager	Sunshine Pils
2013	Best Wheat Beer	Best of the Philly Beer Scene	Wheat Beer	DreamWeaver
2013	Best IPA/Pale Ale	Best of the Philly Beer Scene	IPA/Pale Ale	Perpetual IPA
2013	Best Seasonal Beer	Best of the Philly Beer Scene	Seasonal Beer	Nugget Nectar
2013	Philly Tap Finder Award	Best of the Philly Beer Scene	Most Searches, Local Beer	Nugget Nectar
2013	Sales Rep of the Year	Best of the Philly Beer Scene	---	Nick Johnson
2013	1st Place	Philadelphia Inquirer "Brew-Vitational"	Pilsner	Sunshine Pils
2013	Gold medal	Great American Beer Festival	Bock	Troegenator
2013	Bronze medal	Great American Beer Festival	German-Style Pilsener	Sunshine pils
2014	Gold medal	Great American Beer Festival	Bock	Troegenator

== Tröegs distribution states ==
- Pennsylvania
- Ohio
- Maryland
- Delaware
- New Jersey
- Virginia
- New York
- Massachusetts
- District of Columbia
- Connecticut
- West Virginia

== See also ==
- List of food companies
