= Maki Namekawa =

Japanese pianist (born 1969)

Maki Namekawa 滑川 真希
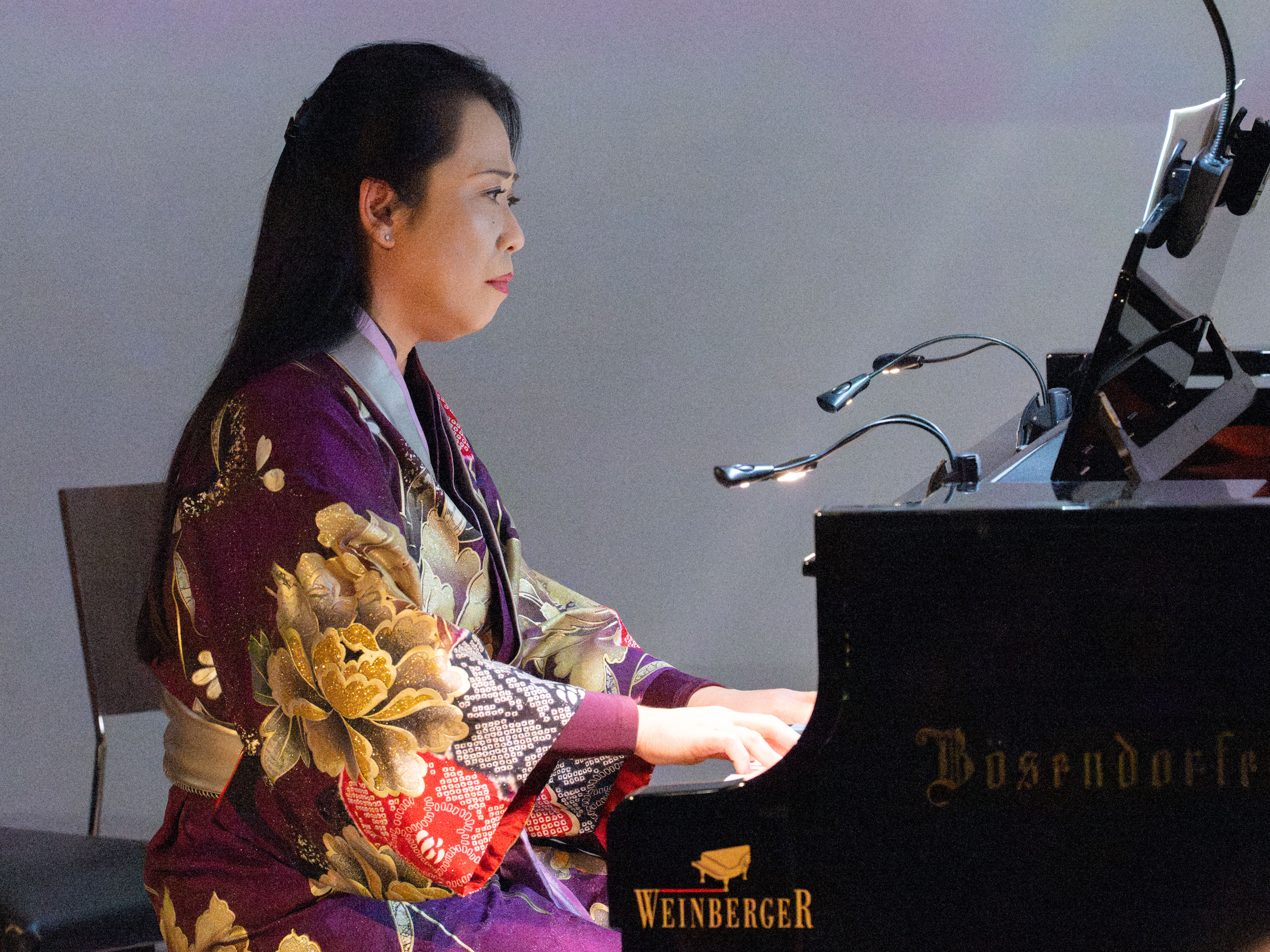
- Namekawa in 2025

Background information
- Born: 1969 (age 56–57); Tokyo, Japan
- Instrument: Piano
- Spouse: Dennis Russell Davies
- Website: www.makinamekawa.com

Maki Namekawa (born 1969) is a Japanese pianist known for her performances and interpretations of contemporary classical music compositions such as études. She is also known for her collaborations with conductor Dennis Russell Davies and composer, Philip Glass.

== Life ==
Namekawa was born in 1969 in Tokyo, Japan. She studied Kunitachi College of Music, under the pianist Mikio Ikezawa, and at the Paris Conservatory under Henriette Puig-Roget. She won the Leonid Kreutzer Prize in 1994 and graduated as a soloist with special distinction in 1995.

In 2003, she began regularly performing piano duos with American conductor and pianist, Dennis Russell Davies. The two are married.

In 2013, she performed the world premiere of Philip Glass's 20 Études for solo piano during the Perth International Arts Festival, in Perth, Australia. She later performed the Études' US premiere at Louise M. Davies Symphony Hall, in San Francisco, California, in March, 2015.

In July, 2019, she premiered Glass's Piano Sonata, which was specifically written for her to perform, in Essen, Germany. On 13 May 2022, she led the US premiere of Joe Hisaishi's Toccata at Kresge Auditorium in Cambridge, Massachusetts.
