= Weave Bridge =

Coordinates: 39.94864°N 75.18702°W

The Weave Bridge is a 145 ft (44 m) bridge at the University of Pennsylvania, USA, which was conceptualized by Cecil Balmond and engineered by Ammann & Whitney. It was commissioned by the university in 2007, and opened in June 2009.

The bridge creates a pedestrian passage over the Amtrak train tracks that currently separate the main campus from athletic fields along the Schuylkill River. The design features a "braided rope" structure consisting of stainless steel strands. It marks the first milestone in the university's plan to transform a former postal depot into a 24-acre (97,000 m^{2}) complex, called Penn Park. The design uses a "never before used bridge structure" It is in keeping with Balmond's perusal of a "non-linear world, and his principle that "structure as conceptual rigour is architecture." His dynamic and organizational approach to structure is informed by the sciences of complexity, non-linear organization and emergence.

The design obviates the use of conventional longitudinal supporting beams. According to Esquire magazine:"The span is a poetic solution to a pedestrian problem." Balmond founded and runs the University of Pennsylvania's Non-Linear Systems Organization, a research group he set up to explore ways in which architecture can demonstrate, test and apply insights from mathematics and sciences. He currently holds the Paul Philippe Cret chair as Professor of Architecture at PennDesign. Cecil Balmond realized the design through Arup's AGU, an experimental research and design unit he founded in 2000. Balmond joined Arup in 1968 and is Deputy Chairman.
