= Planet Earth Live =

2010 BBC nature documentary film

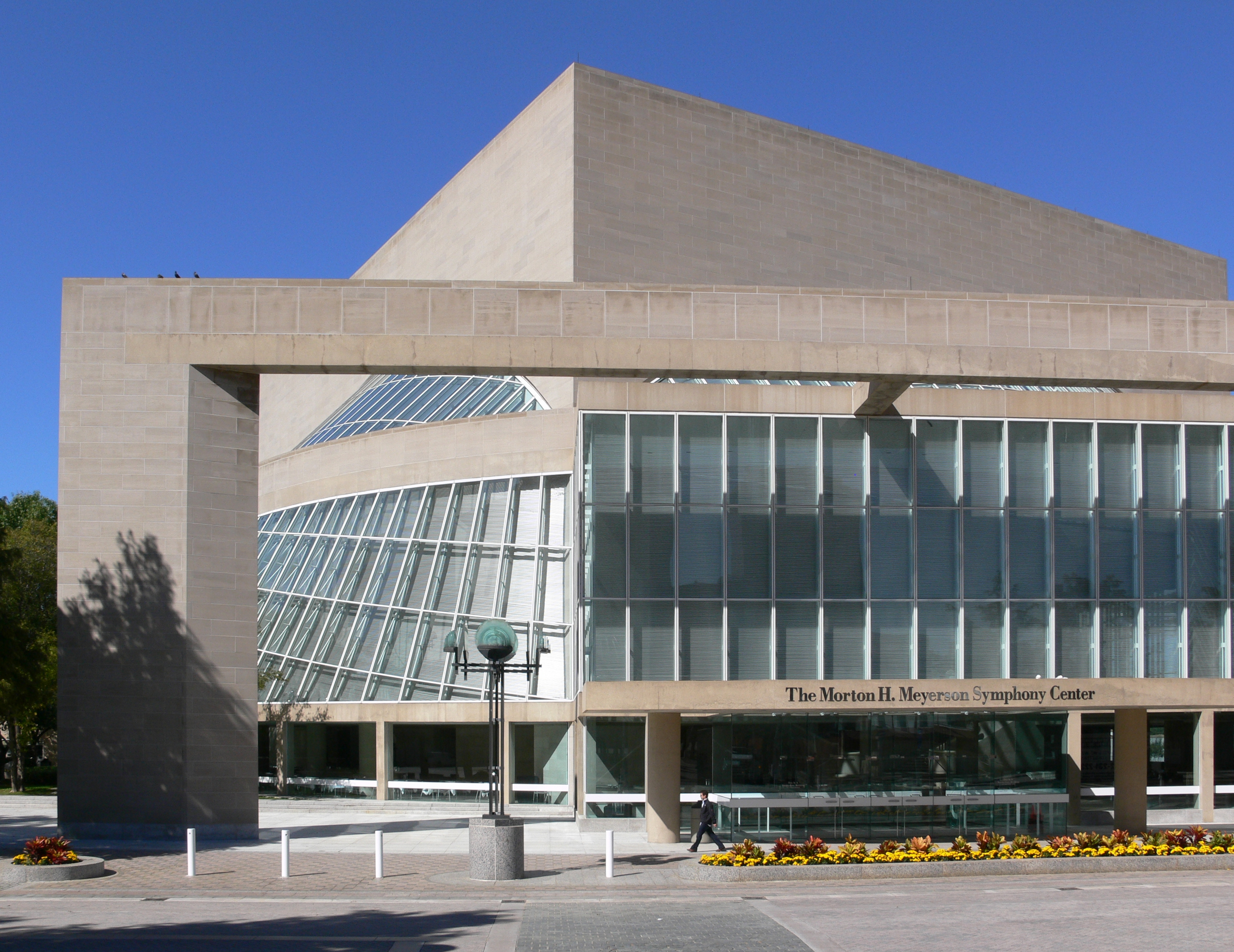
Planet Earth Live debuted at the Morton H. Meyerson Symphony Center in Dallas, Texas, on June 25, 2010.

Planet Earth Live is a 2010 BBC nature documentary film that celebrated its premiere in the U.S. A tour featuring narration and live orchestral performance featuring the score by composer George Fenton, who serves as conductor, accompanies the film. Each show runs 90 minutes plus an intermission, featuring the highlights from the television series Planet Earth in a full HD screening, with live orchestra and narration. The tour features some of the leading classical orchestras providing accompaniment in prominent music venues in several large cities. The tour which was originally scheduled to visit Dallas, Atlanta, Chicago, and Los Angeles, has added performances in Philadelphia and the Baltimore-Washington, D.C. area. In 2011, the documentary played in the United Kingdom.

== Details ==
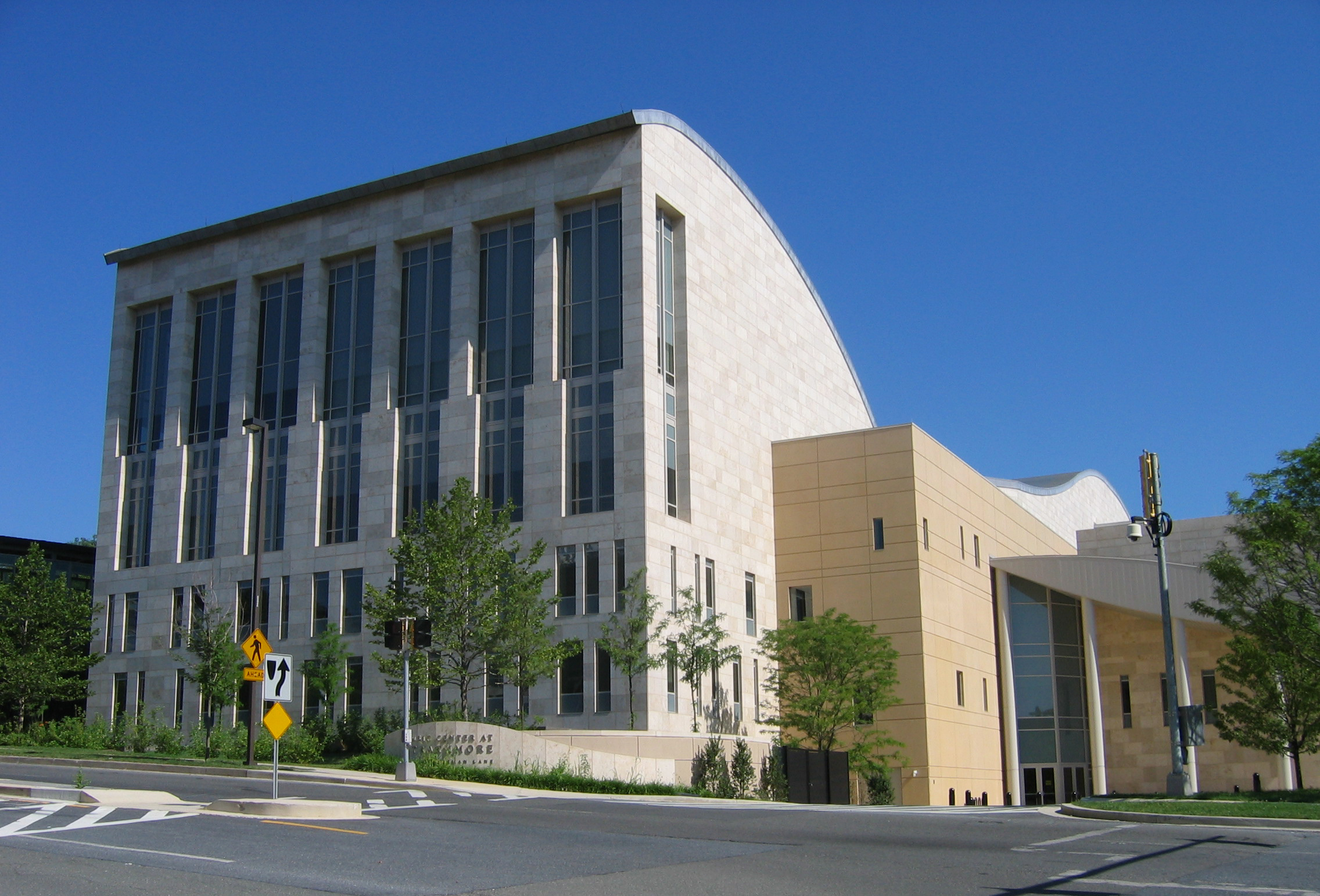
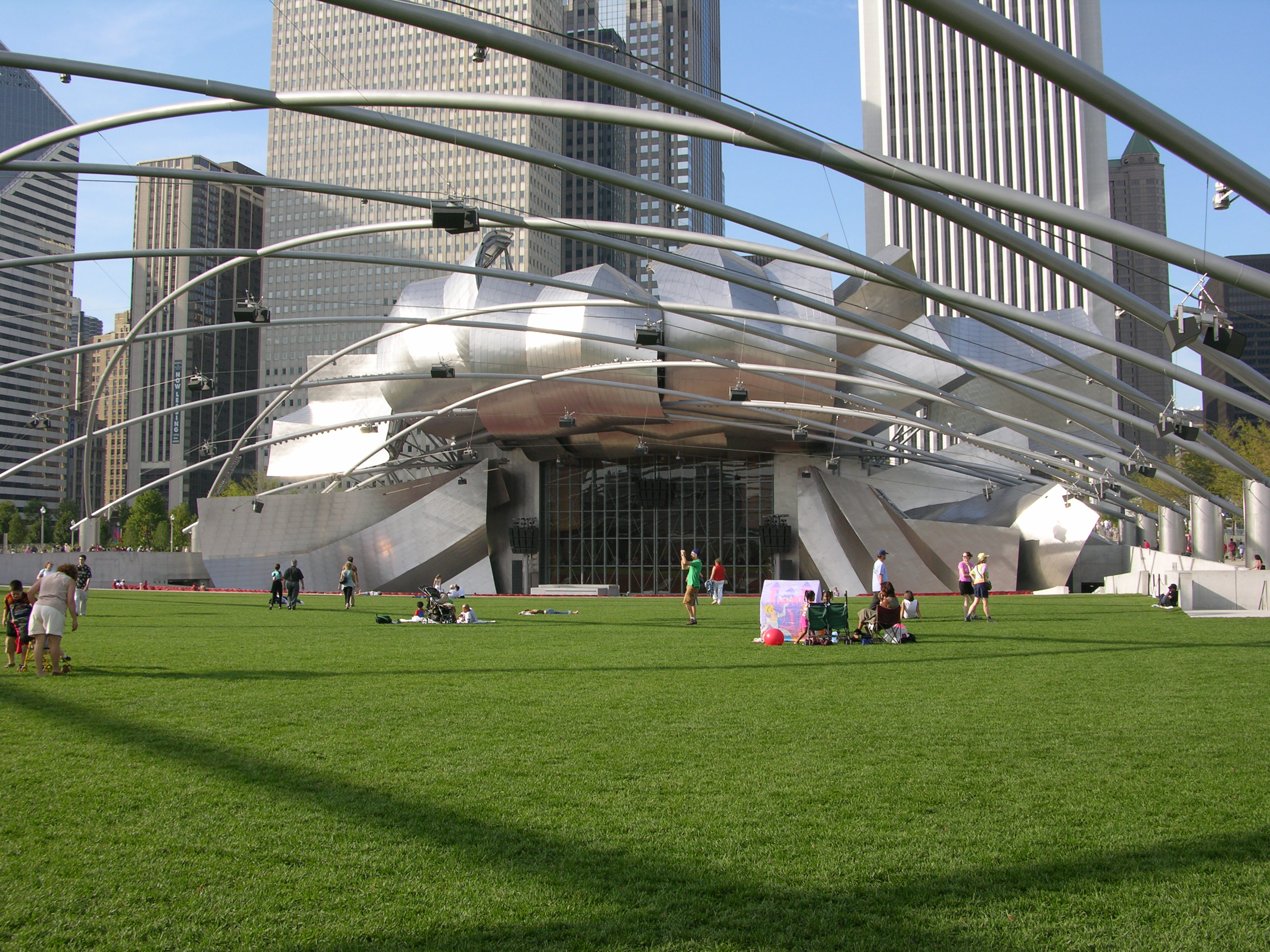
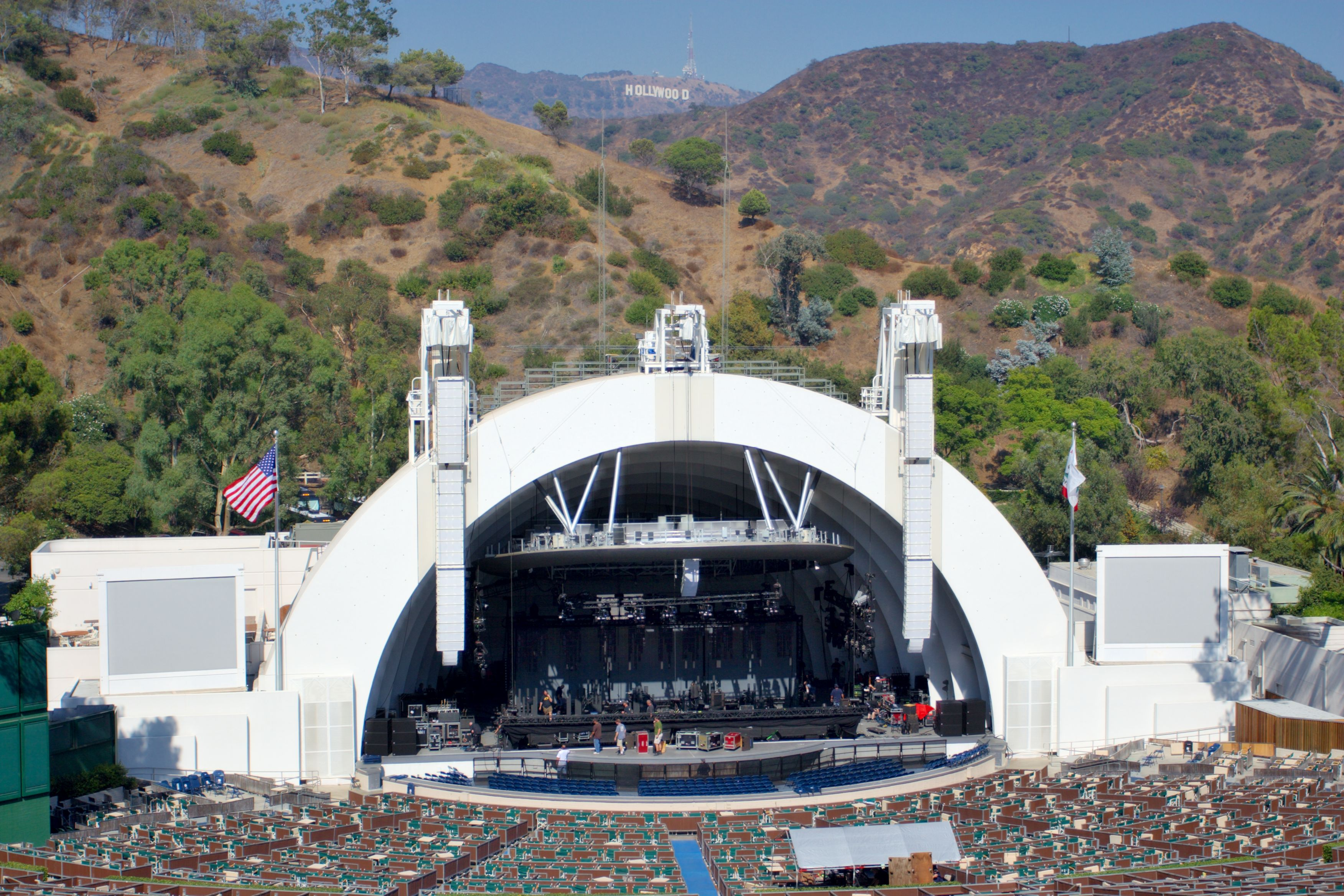
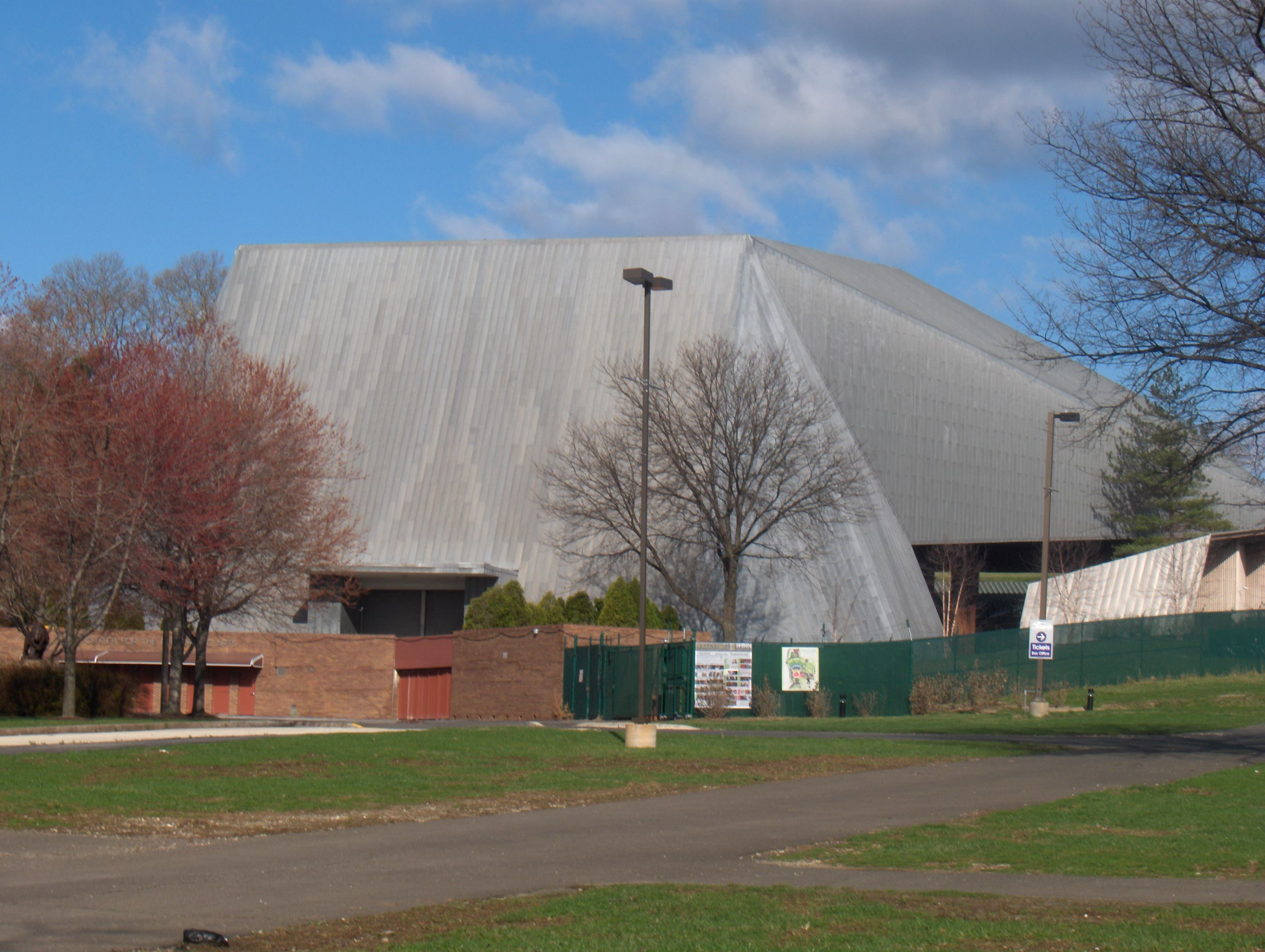
The show also visited (left to right) Strathmore, Jay Pritzker Pavilion, Hollywood Bowl and Mann Center for the Performing Arts

The film includes highlights from the Planet Earth television show that was produced over four years as the result of efforts that extended over 2,000 days in the field using 71 film crews in 204 locations and 62 countries. The film features footage of deep sea oceanography, deserts landscapes, arctic tundra, rare animal life and other natural wonders.

London-based soprano Haley Glennie-Smith has a regular role in the concert and has traveled to perform with the show at its various venues. While the video screen projects imagery of Earth, Glennie-Smith performs vocal accompaniment with symphonic backup. While performing she attempts to use her voice to mimic the duduk, a double-reed woodwind instrument popular in Eastern Europe and the Middle East.

Composer George Fenton provided the score The Blue Planet documentary series in 2001. From that show, Fenton created The Blue Planet Live! that toured in the UK and worldwide, produced by World Class Service ltd in association with BBC Worldwide. Fenton was also the musical composer for Planet Earth, which was a joint BBC and Discovery Channel co-production, that first aired in 2007.

== Schedule ==
Date	Performers	Venue
June 25, 2010	Dallas Symphony Orchestra	Morton H. Meyerson Symphony Center
June 26, 2010	Dallas Symphony Orchestra	Morton H. Meyerson Symphony Center
July 8, 2010	Baltimore Symphony Orchestra	Strathmore
July 16, 2010	Atlanta Symphony Orchestra	Verizon Wireless Amphitheatre at Encore Park
July 21, 2010	Grant Park Symphony Orchestra	Jay Pritzker Pavilion
July 23, 2010	Los Angeles Philharmonic	Hollywood Bowl
July 24, 2010	Los Angeles Philharmonic	Hollywood Bowl
July 29, 2010	Philadelphia Orchestra	Mann Center for the Performing Arts

The tour's original schedule included its world premiere at Dallas' Morton H. Meyerson Symphony Center on June 25 and 26, 2010 with accompaniment by the Dallas Symphony Orchestra. Other venues and orchestras confirmed on the original schedule were Atlanta's Verizon Wireless Amphitheatre at Encore Park on July 16 with accompaniment by the Atlanta Symphony Orchestra, Chicago's Grant Park Music Festival in Millennium Park on July 21 with accompaniment by the Grant Park Symphony Orchestra at the Jay Pritzker Pavilion and two dates at the Los Angeles Hollywood Bowl on July 23 and 24 with accompaniment by the Los Angeles Philharmonic. After the original schedule was announced, a show of July 29 was added for the season finale Philadelphia Orchestra performance at Mann Center for the Performing Arts. Additionally, a show of July 8 was added at the Strathmore in Bethesda, Maryland, with accompaniment by the Baltimore Symphony Orchestra. All venues required ticket purchases except the Exelon-sponsored Pritzker Pavilion performance in Chicago, which was free as part of the Grant Park Music Festival series.

On November 18, 2011, George Fenton conducted the BBC Concert Orchestra for the UK premiere of Planet Earth Live at the Barbican Centre. Large parts of the production crew of Planet Earth, including Sir David Attenborough were in the audience.
