= Jay Pritzker Pavilion =

Bandshell in Millennium Park in Chicago, Illinois, US

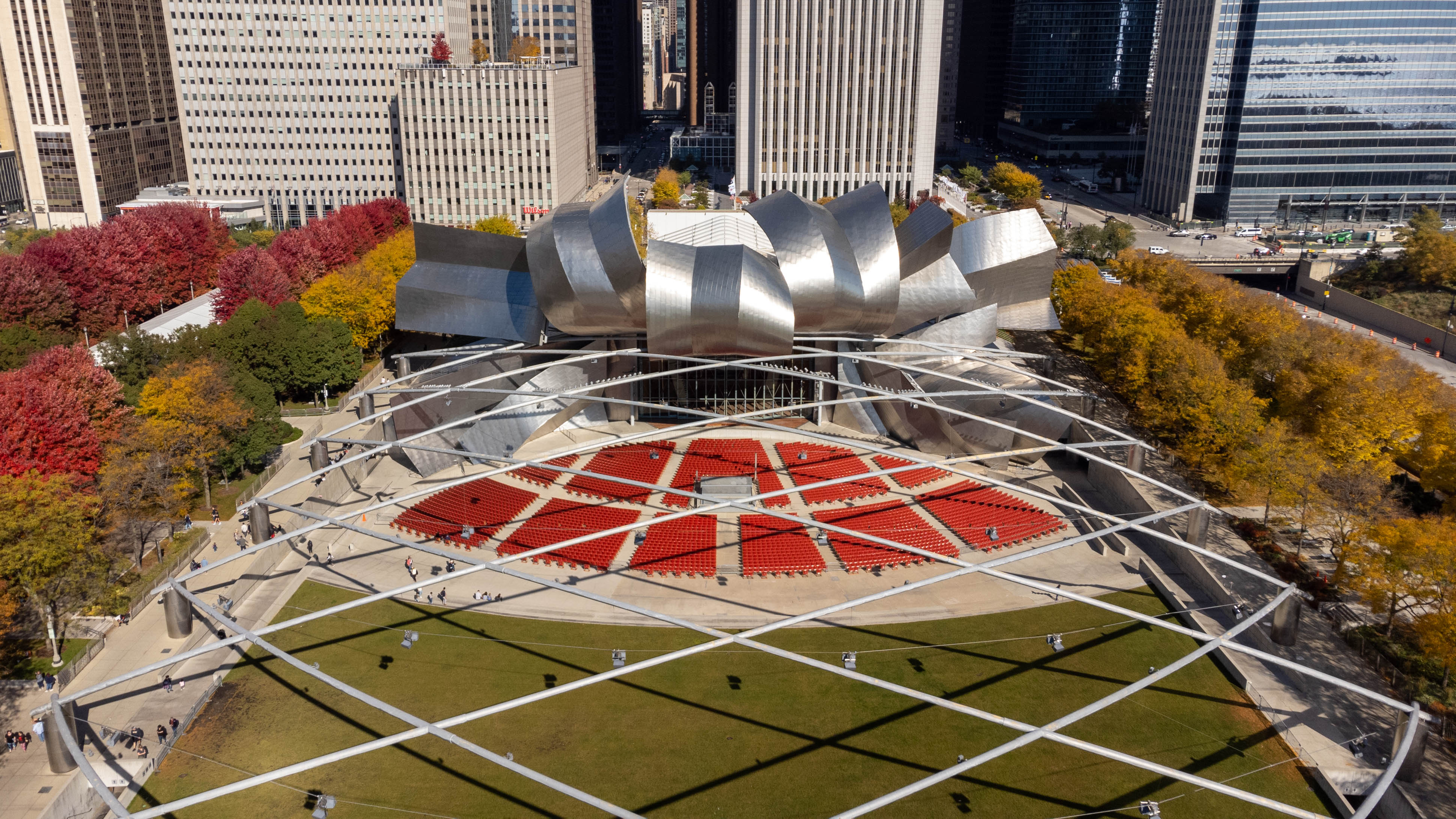
- The Pavilion in October 2022
- Interactive map of Jay Pritzker Pavilion
- Address: Millennium Park; 201 E. Randolph Street; Chicago, Illinois; United States
- Coordinates: 41°52′59″N 87°37′19″W
- Owner: City of Chicago
- Capacity: 11,000 (4,000 fixed, 7,000 lawn)
- Current use: Performing arts
- Parking: 2218 (shared with Millennium Park)

Construction
- Opened: July 16, 2004
- Years active: 2004–present
- Architect: Frank Gehry

Website
- City of Chicago Millennium Park

Jay Pritzker Pavilion, also known as Pritzker Pavilion or Pritzker Music Pavilion, is a bandshell in Millennium Park in the Loop community area of Chicago in Cook County, Illinois, United States. It is located on the south side of Randolph Street and east of the Chicago Landmark Historic Michigan Boulevard District. The pavilion was named after Jay Pritzker, whose family is known for owning Hyatt Hotels. The building was designed by architect Frank Gehry, who accepted the design commission in April 1999; the pavilion was constructed between June 1999 and July 2004, opening officially on July 16, 2004.

Pritzker Pavilion serves as the centerpiece for Millennium Park and is the home of the Grant Park Symphony Orchestra and Chorus and the Grant Park Music Festival, one of the nation's only remaining free outdoor classical music series. It also hosts a wide range of music series and annual performing arts events. Performers ranging from mainstream rock bands to classical musicians and opera singers have appeared at the pavilion, which even hosts physical fitness activities such as yoga. All rehearsals at the pavilion are open to the public; trained guides are available for the music festival rehearsals, which are well-attended.

Millennium Park is part of the larger Grant Park. The pavilion, which has a capacity of 11,000, is Grant Park's small event outdoor performing arts venue, and complements Petrillo Music Shell, the park's older and larger bandshell. Pritzker Pavilion is built partially atop the Harris Theater for Music and Dance, the park's indoor performing arts venue, with which it shares a loading dock and backstage facilities. Initially the pavilion's lawn seats were free for all concerts, but this changed when Tori Amos performed the first rock concert there on August 31, 2005.

The construction of the pavilion created a legal controversy, given that there are historic limitations on the height of buildings in Grant Park. To avoid these legal restrictions, the city classifies the bandshell as a work of art rather than a building. With several design and assembly problems, the construction plans were revised over time, with features eliminated and others added as successful fundraising allowed the budget to grow. In the end, the performance venue was designed with a large fixed seating area, a Great Lawn, a trellis network to support the sound system and a signature Gehry stainless steel headdress. It features a sound system with an acoustic design that replicates an indoor concert hall sound experience. The pavilion and Millennium Park have received recognition by critics, particularly for their accessibility; an accessibility award ceremony held at the pavilion in 2005 described it as "one of the most accessible parks – not just in the United States but possibly the world".

== Design and development ==
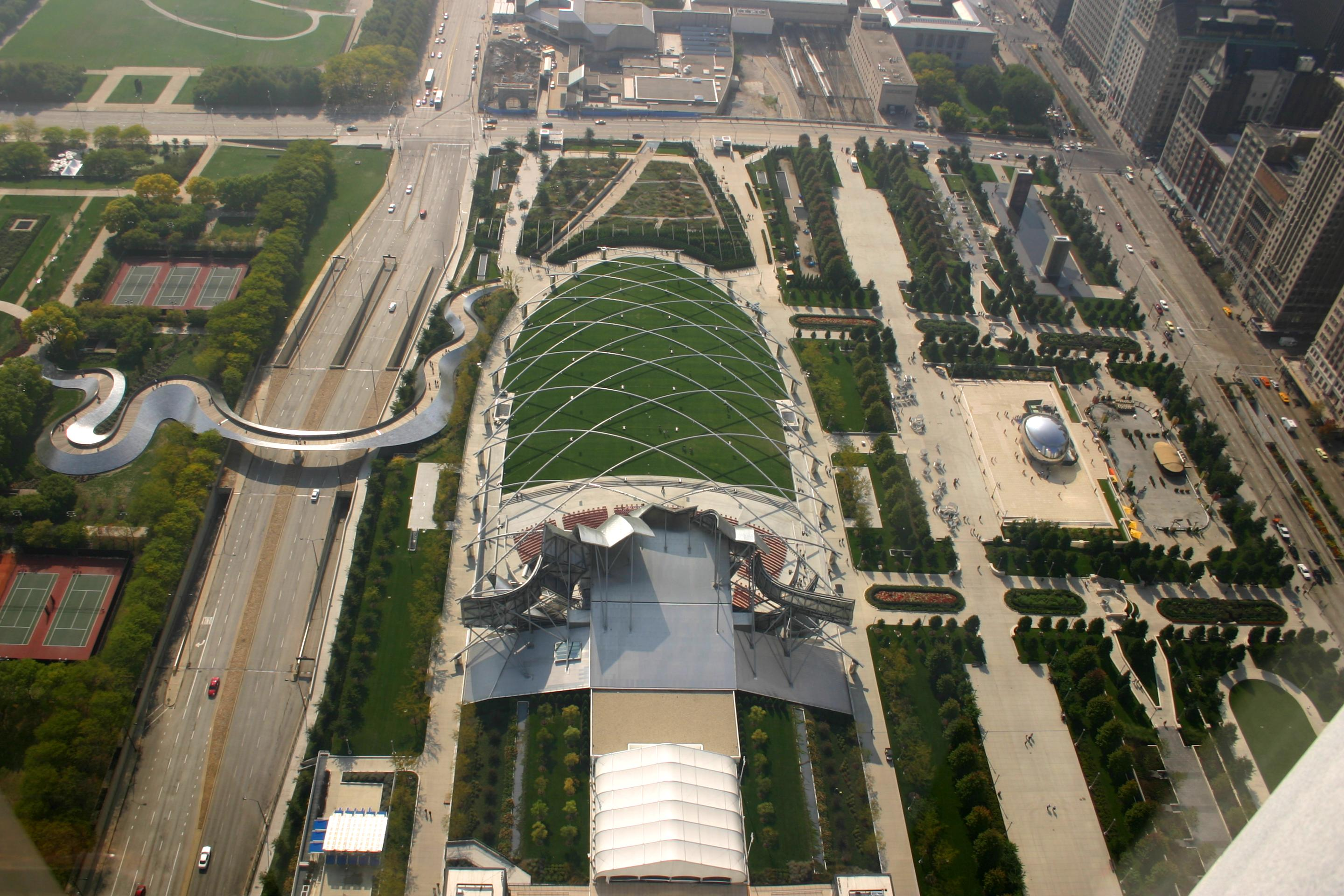
The Great Lawn, trellis and pavilion with the adjoining Harris Theater, within Millennium Park

The Jay Pritzker Pavilion is a home for the Grant Park Music Festival, which began in 1935 in the original Petrillo Music Shell. Lying between Lake Michigan to the east and the Loop to the west, Grant Park has been Chicago's front yard since the mid-19th century. Its northwest corner, north of Monroe Street and the Art Institute, east of Michigan Avenue, south of Randolph Street, and west of Columbus Drive, had been Illinois Central rail yards and parking lots until 1997, when it was made available for development by the city as Millennium Park. In 2007, Millennium Park trailed only Navy Pier as a Chicago tourist attraction.

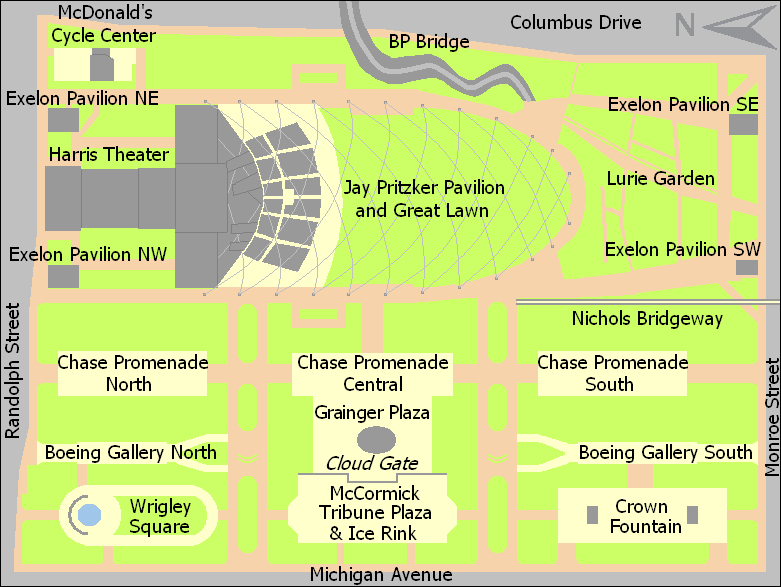
Image map of Millennium Park; east is at the top. Each feature or label is linked.

When the city first determined that a new pavilion should be built, the commission was supposed to go to Skidmore, Owings and Merrill. The original pavilion design was much more modest than the structure that was eventually built, with a smaller shell structure and speakers affixed to poles interspersed throughout the seating area. However, two factors led to the cancellation of the original plans. First, the project's scope changed as a result of additional funds raised by John H. Bryan, former CEO of the Sara Lee Corporation. The second factor was the intervention of the Pritzker family as potential donors. Unimpressed with the pavilion's original design, Cindy Pritzker "mandated that Frank Gehry be involved in its re-design". Jay Pritzker, a prominent Chicago businessman, had died in January 1999; his family own several businesses, including Hyatt Hotels. Jay and Cindy Pritzker had founded the Pritzker Prize in architecture in 1979, and the Pritzker family's Hyatt Foundation continues to award it annually. Architect Frank Gehry had received the Pritzker Prize in 1989.

In February 1999, the city announced it was negotiating with Gehry to design a proscenium arch and orchestra enclosure for a bandshell in the new park, as well as a pedestrian bridge over Columbus Drive (which became BP Pedestrian Bridge). The city sought donors to cover Gehry's work, and the Chicago Tribune dubbed him "the hottest architect in the universe" for his acclaimed Guggenheim Museum Bilbao. The Tribune noted Gehry's designs would not include such Mayor Richard M. Daley trademarks as wrought iron and seasonal flower boxes.

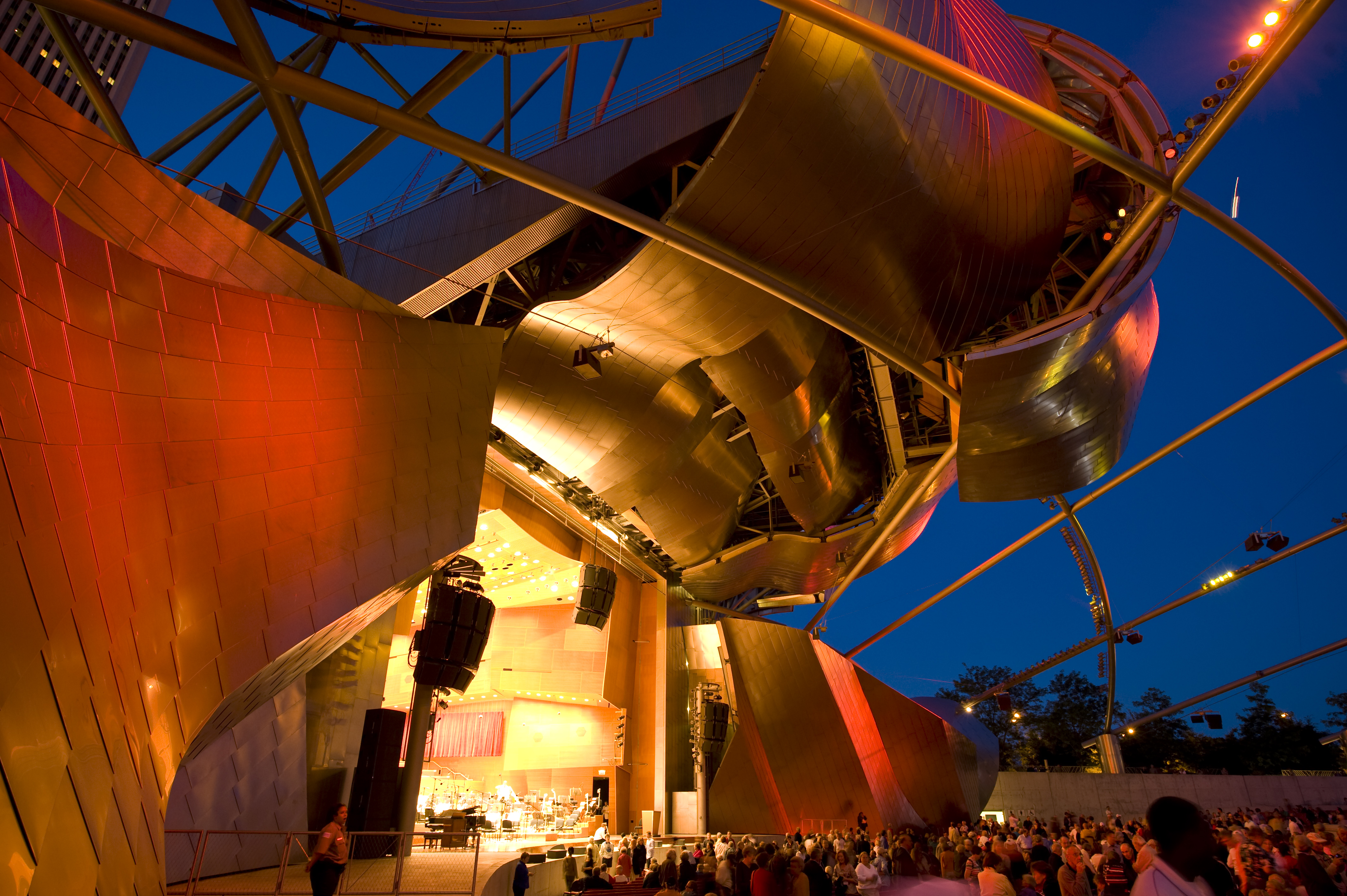
Grant Park Music Festival night view of Frank Gehry's Pritzker Pavilion

Millennium Park project manager Edward Uhlir said "Frank [Gehry] is just the cutting edge of the next century of architecture," and noted that no other architect was being sought. Skidmore, Owings and Merrill architect Adrian Smith approached Gehry several times on behalf of the city, which originally asked him about doing just a facade, but Gehry was uninterested. A few months later the city asked him to get involved in Millennium Park; Gehry felt he would prefer to design a building, but that he could not complete it in time for the Millennium, and that he would need a much larger budget than the city had envisioned.

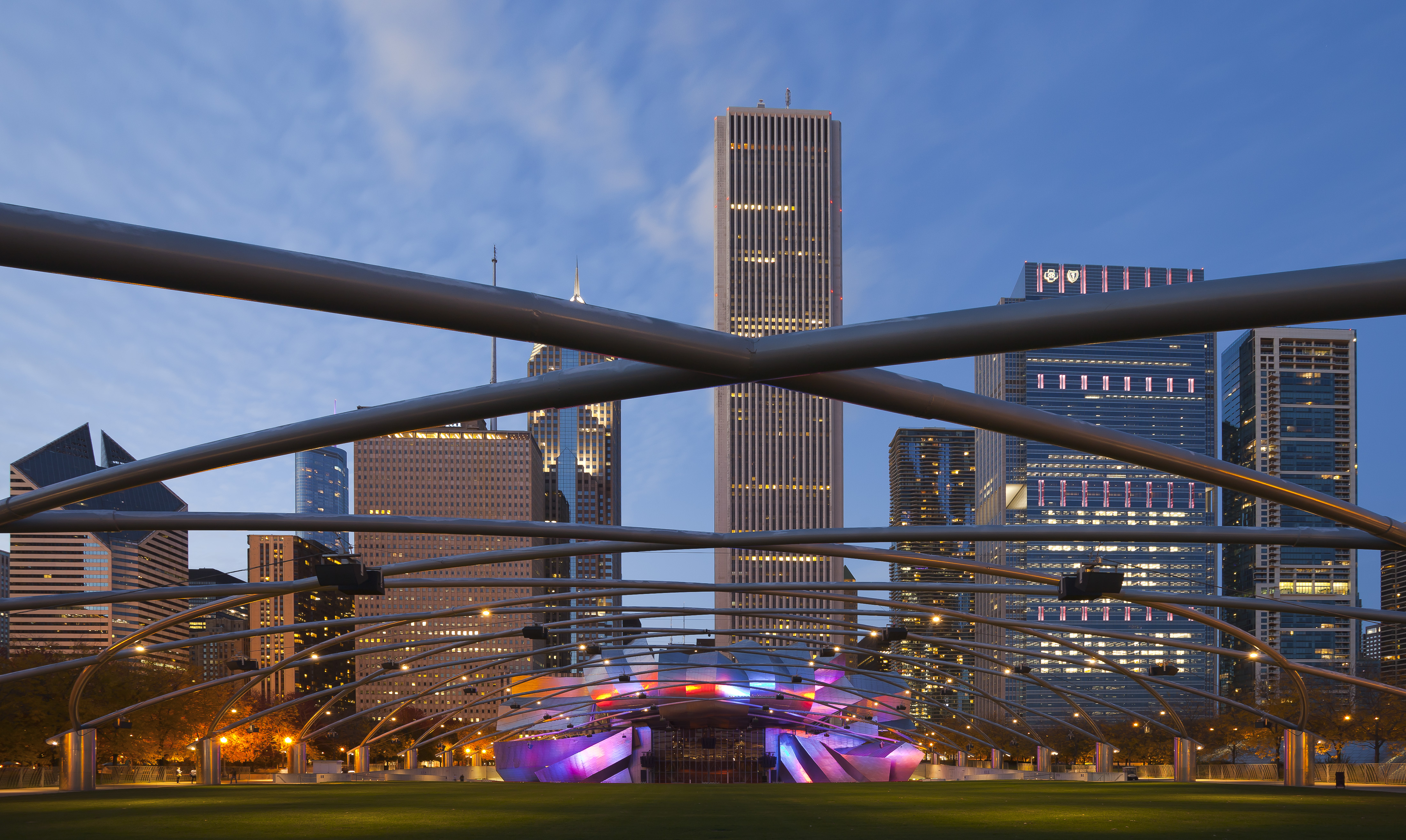
The pavilion and Chicago skyline in October 2012

The city wanted Gehry, the donors supported him, and he was interested in the project. The key component in the modern themes strategy was Gehry's acceptance of the commission in April 1999. That month, the city announced that the Pritzker family had donated $15 million to fund Gehry's bandshell and an additional nine donors committed a total of $10 million. The day of this announcement, after it became clear that Cindy Pritzker would fund the project, Gehry agreed to the design request. In November, when his designs for both the pavilion and bridge were unveiled, Gehry already had the basic design for the bandshell, but said the bridge's design was very preliminary and not well-conceived because funding for it was not committed. The BP Pedestrian Bridge is designed to serve as a buffer against street noise, helping the pavilion's acoustics.

According to the Guggenheim Museum, the Jay Pritzker Pavilion "suggests musical qualities", much like Gehry's Experience Music Project in Seattle, Washington. The Pritzker Pavilion follows a series of open-air projects by Gehry, such as the Merriweather Post Pavilion in Columbia, Maryland, the Concord Performing Arts Center in Concord, California, and numerous renovations to the Hollywood Bowl in Hollywood, California.

== Construction ==
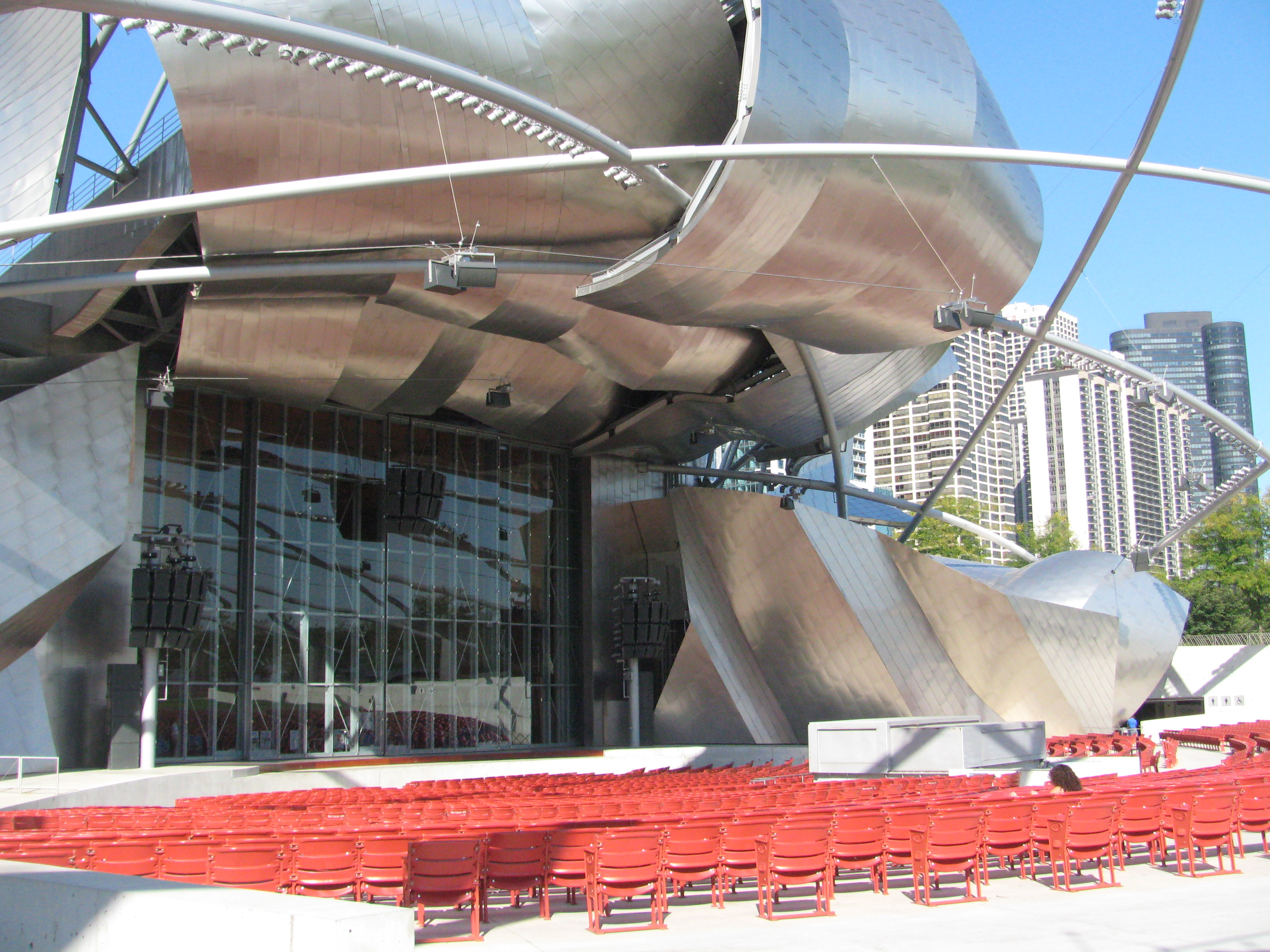
The pavilion bandshell is designed to reflect sound for optimal acoustics.

Jay Pritzker Pavilion cost $60 million, a quarter of which came from the Pritzker family donation. It includes 4,000 fixed seats and a 95,000 sq ft (8,800 m^{2}) Great Lawn that can accommodate an additional 7,000 people. The pavilion was built above and behind the Harris Theater, which has the benefit that Millennium Park's indoor and outdoor performance venues share a loading dock, rehearsal rooms and other backstage facilities.

The bandshell's brushed stainless steel headdress frames the 120 ft (37 m) proscenium theatre; the main stage can accommodate a full orchestra and chorus of 150 members. The bandshell is connected to a trellis of interlocking crisscrossing steel pipes that support the innovative sound system, which mimics indoor concert hall acoustics. The pavilion has restrooms on both its east and west sides. It is one of two features in the park to include accessible restrooms; the other is McCormick Tribune Plaza & Ice Rink. The majority of the park's 123 toilet fixtures (78 for women, 45 for men) are located in underground arcades to the east and west of the pavilion, with the ones on the east being heated for winter use.

Millennium Park is built on top of a large underground parking garage. Construction started before the park's design was completed, and in January 2000, 17 additional caissons had to be added to the partially built garage to support the weight of Gehry's pavilion. In April the tops of all these caissons had to be rebuilt for changes in the pavilion's foundation.

U.S. Equities Realty was responsible for negotiating contracts with Gehry and all contractors. Walsh Construction and its subcontractors were hired to execute three elements of Gehry's design: the structural steel supporting the stainless steel ribbons, the ribbons themselves and the trellis and associated sound system.

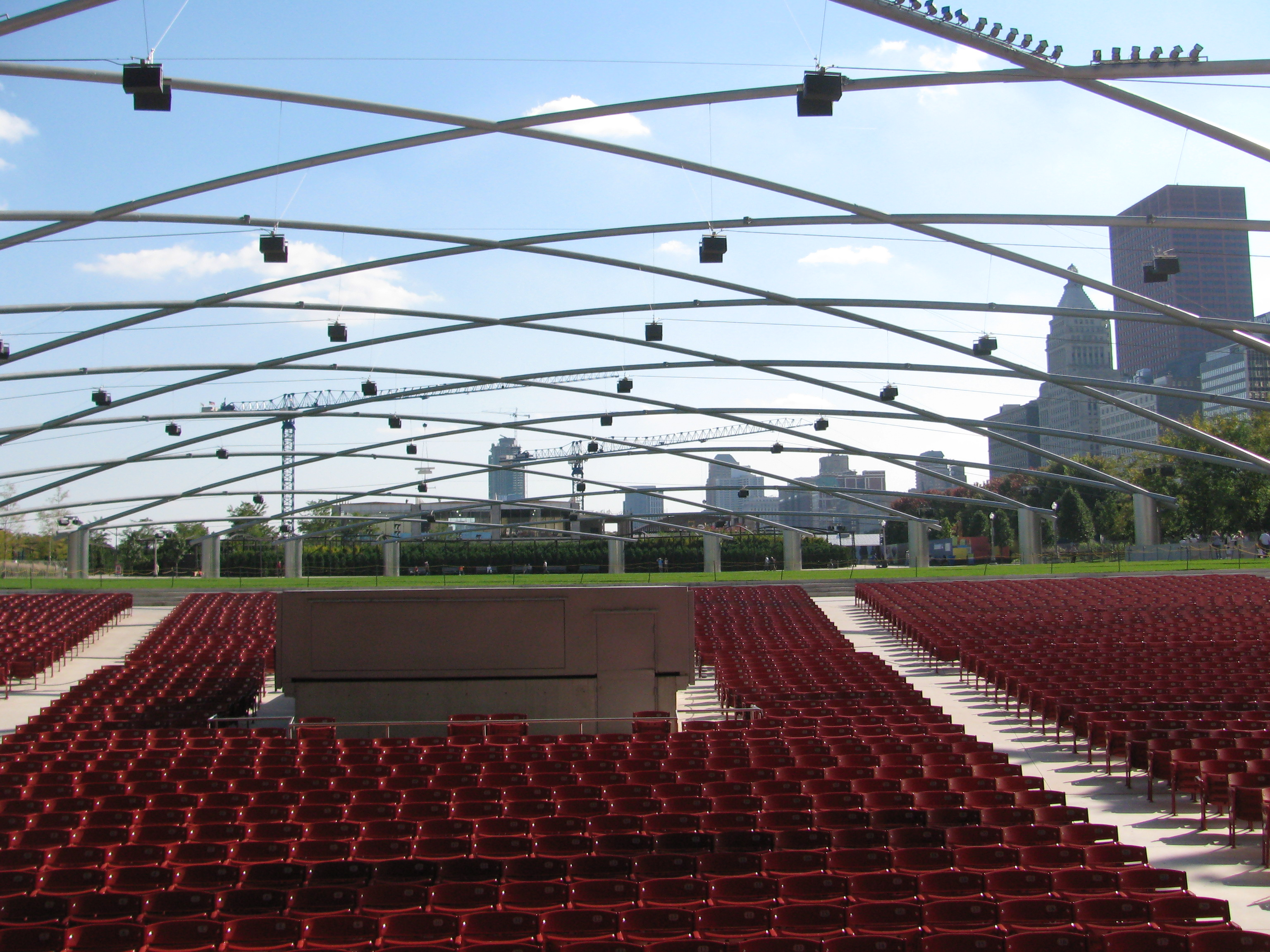
Stage view of the pavilion's seats, trellis and Great Lawn, with Millennium Park and the Historic Michigan Boulevard District behind

The LeJeune Steel Company of Minneapolis was the subcontractor for the structural steel. The pavilion's concrete walls frame the orchestra shell space, which is 100 ft (30 m) wide, 50 ft (15 m) tall and has no support columns. The pavilion's roof rests on a dozen north–south trusses supported by east–west truss girders. The south side of the orchestra shell space is enclosed by the glass doors of the proscenium, which are about 50 ft (15 m) tall, 100 ft (30 m) wide and function like aircraft hangar doors made of glass. They were the largest doors that Glass Solutions of Elmhurst, Illinois, ever produced; the thickness of the glass was a design problem for the steel supports.

Zahner of Kansas City, Missouri, was the subcontractor for the pavilion's ribbons, described as "stainless steel panels that appear to be peeling back from the central opening". The proscenium's metal ribbons are composed of 697 panels that range from 6 to 300 sq ft (0.56–27.87 m^{2}) and 1,600 to 20,000 lb (730–9,070 kg) with a thickness of about 14 in (36 cm). They are made from aluminum with a stainless steel outer layer that has a uniform shade across all panels. The structural steel for the ribbons had an abnormally low fit tolerance of 0.125 in (3.2 mm), rather than the standard 1 to 2 in (25 to 51 mm). The proscenium was inspired by Gehry's 2001 flagship store for Issey Miyake in New York City, which has sculptured titanium that represents pleating. During construction, about five cranes and 18 aerial lifts were on site. The apex of the center element is approximately 150 ft (46 m) high, which was near the limits of basic construction equipment at the time.

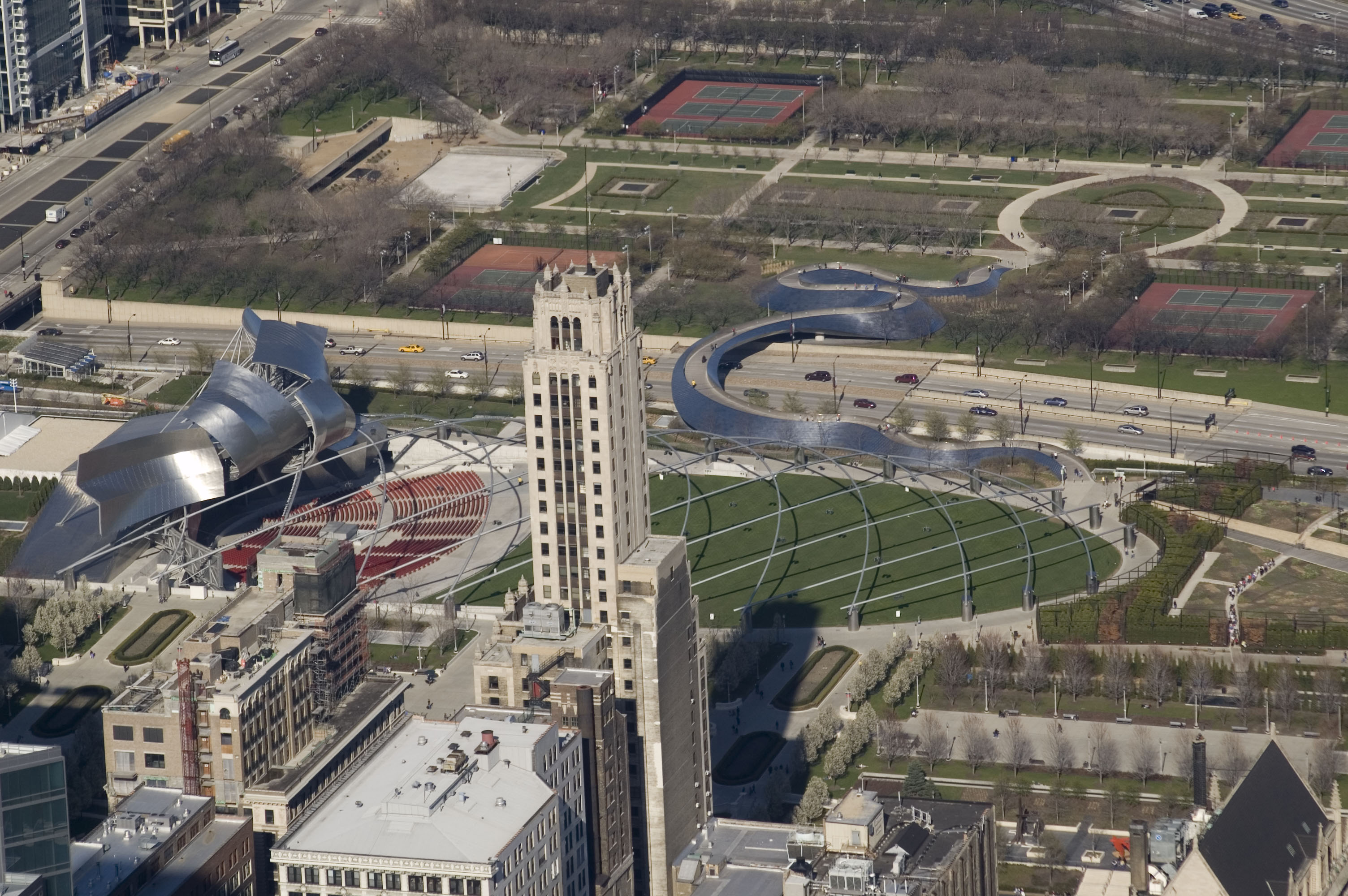
View of the pavilion with the Harris Theater (left), BP Pedestrian Bridge (above) and Lurie Garden (right), as seen from Willis Tower.

Acme Structural of Springfield, Missouri, was the subcontractor for the trellis over the Great Lawn, which resulted from the distributed sound system's requirement for speakers every 70 ft (21 m). One way to achieve this would have involved placing the speakers on pipes or columns, but the resulting forest of columns seemed discordant with the architecture. Gehry preferred the trellis although it cost about $3 million more than speakers arranged on posts would have. The trellis uses 22 criss-crossing arches in a lattice pattern, and is noted for its parabolic grid. The arches use pipes varying in diameter from 12–20 in (30–51 cm) depending upon the load requirements. Arches longer than 300 ft (91 m) have four or five different radii, where radius describes the extent of pipe curvature. The arch pipes connect to the structural steel of the pavilion structure without linking to the metal ribbons. The trellis is 600 by 300 ft (183 by 91 m).

The pavilion's construction was aided by the French CATIA software program and internet conferencing. Early plans to incorporate a surrounding waterfall and stairway were abandoned. In the end, budget limitations led to compromises with the original architectural plan that left many elements in their most straightforward form, such as exposed pipes and conduits, or rough concrete.

=== Acoustics ===
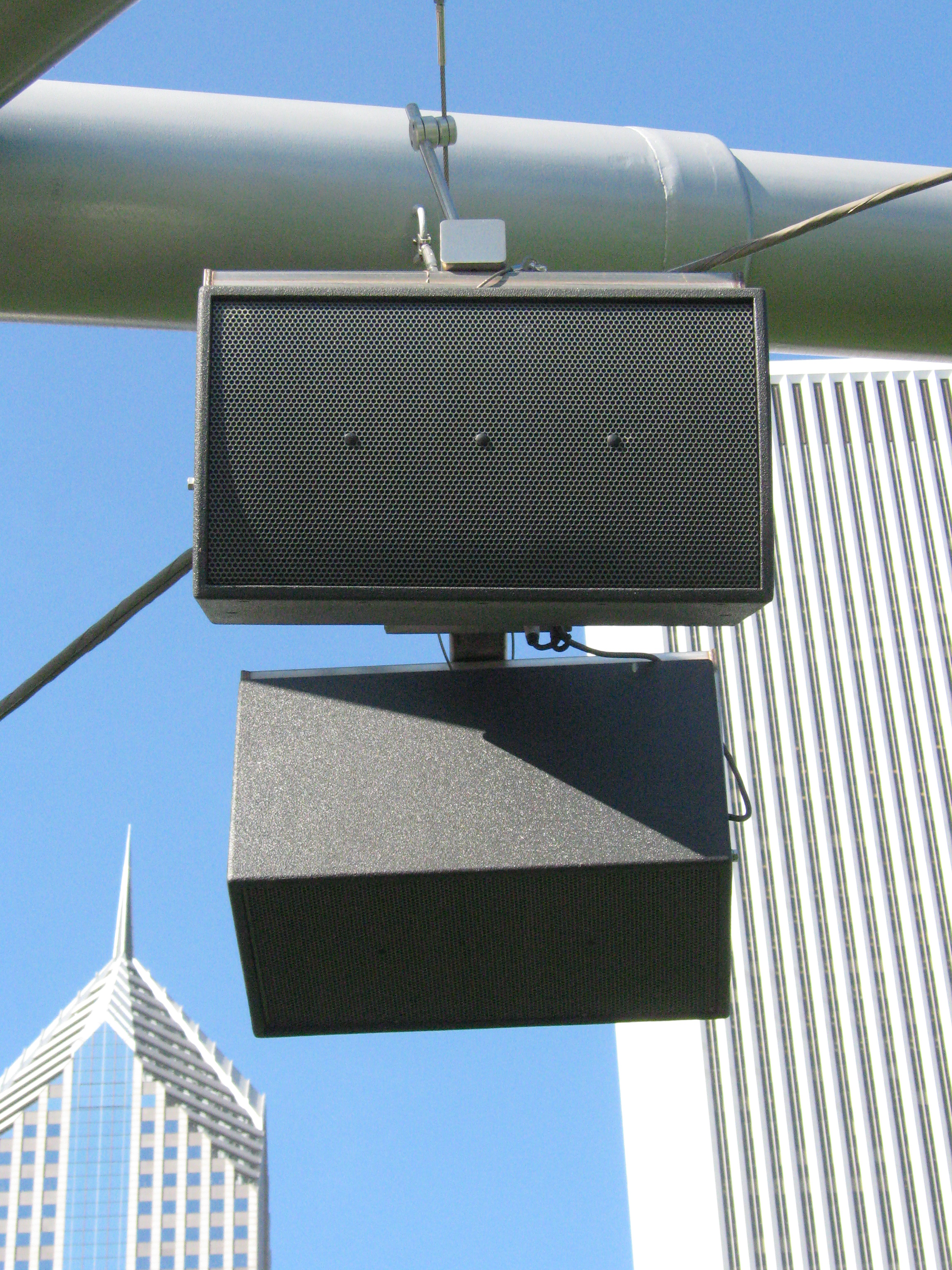
Speakers close up

The Talaske Group of Oak Park, Illinois, was the subcontractor for Jay Pritzker Pavilion's LARES sound system, which "generates the reflected and reverberant energy that surrounds and envelops the listener in an indoor performance venue". The system, which effectively produces an even quality of sound throughout the entire venue, has received critical acclaim for its technological adaptations, such as signal processing in a variety of indoor and outdoor venues. The Pritzker Pavilion is the first permanent outdoor installation of the LARES system in the United States. The trellis has both acoustic and architectural functions; it allows for the precise placement of speakers for sound optimization without visual obstructions, while simultaneously providing a unifying visual canopy.

The overall acoustic system is a distributed sound reinforcement system, which allows musicians on stage to hear each other clearly in a way that facilitates ensemble play. In addition, direct natural sound from the stage is reflected from architectural surfaces as well as being reinforced by two sound systems. The forward-facing reinforcement speakers time the relaying of sound so as to make it seem to have arrived directly from the stage with proper clarity and volume levels. Distributed speakers allow for lower sound volumes than would be necessary with centralized speakers, which would disturb neighboring residences and business.

Instead of reinforcing the sound like a traditional public address system, the sound system on the trellis system seeks to replicate the acoustics of a concert hall and create a clearly defined concert space. Noise from city disturbances is masked by sound arriving directly from lateral sources. Downward facing speakers simulate sound reflection similar to indoor concert hall wall and ceiling effects. Although Chicago Tribune music critic John von Rhein felt the inaugural concert's sound quality was "a work in progress" that varied with the listener's location in the pavilion, critics Kevin Nance and Wayne Delacoma of the Chicago Sun-Times said that on the opening weekend it was clear that the acousticians, Talaske Group, and Gehry had solved many of the problems presenting classical music outdoors. John von Rhein said in 2005, "the system has been fine-tuned over the past two summers and now delivers a warm, even approximation of concert-hall sound to listeners at even the farthest reaches of the lawn. James Palermo, artistic and general director of the Grant Park Music Festival, felt that musicians were able to interact more effectively with the new sound system because they could hear each other better.

== Controversies ==
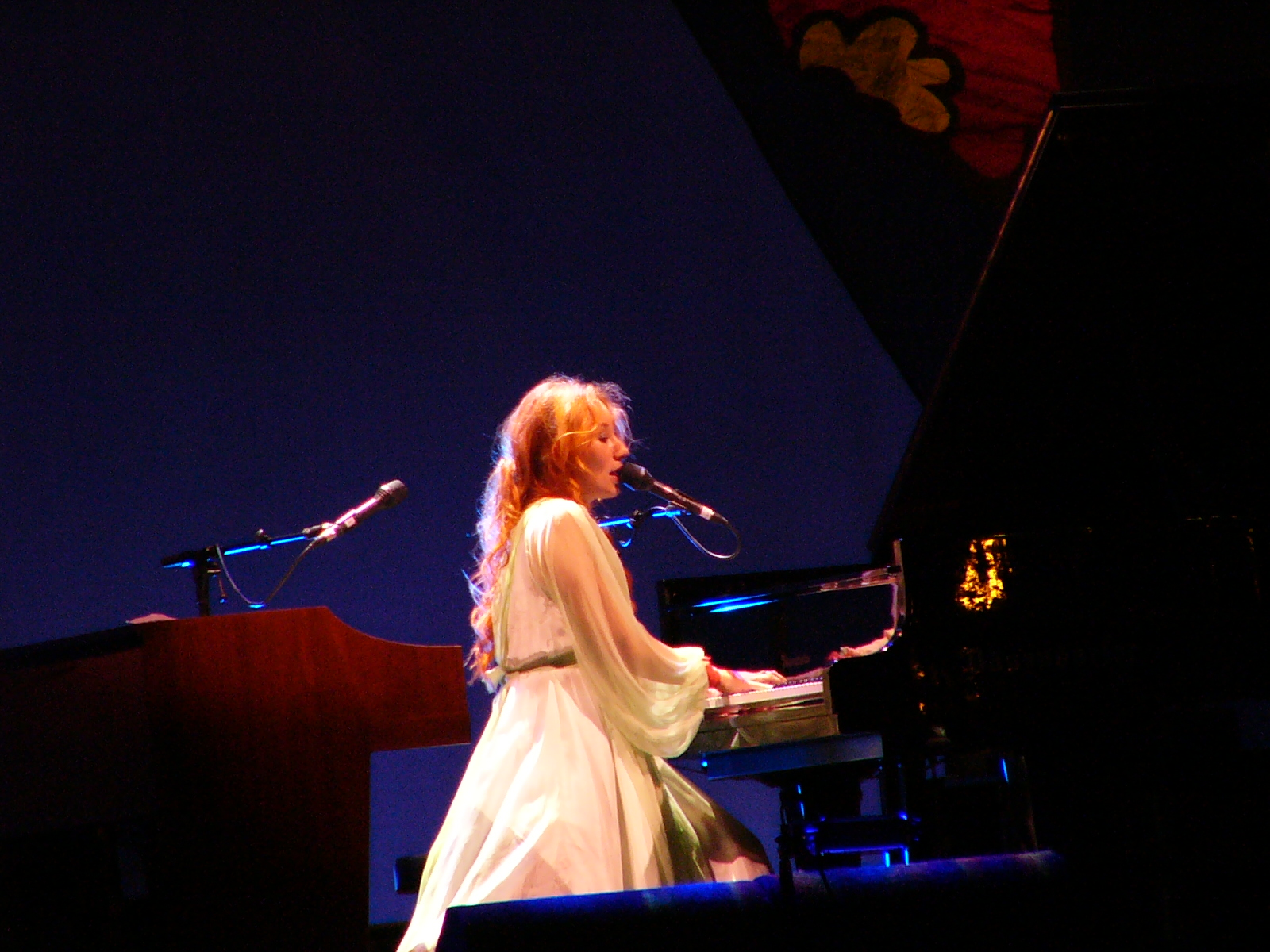
Tori Amos performing at the first pavilion event with a lawn seating fee on August 31, 2005

Protected by legislation that has been affirmed by four previous Illinois Supreme Court rulings, Grant Park has been "forever open, clear and free" since 1836, which was a year before the city of Chicago was incorporated. In 1839, United States Secretary of War Joel Roberts Poinsett declared the land between Randolph Street and Madison Street east of Michigan Avenue "Public Ground forever to remain vacant of buildings. Aaron Montgomery Ward, who is known both as the inventor of mail order and the protector of Grant Park, twice sued the city of Chicago to force it to remove buildings and structures from Grant Park and to keep it from building new ones. As a result, the city has what are termed the Montgomery Ward height restrictions on buildings and structures in Grant Park. However, Crown Fountain and the 130 ft (40 m) Pritzker Pavilion were exempt from the height restrictions because they were classified as works of art and not buildings or structures. According to The Economist, the pavilion is described as a work of art to dodge the protections established by Ward, who "rules over Grant Park from the grave".

The naming of Jay Pritzker Pavilion was a cause for protests. The new pavilion was built as a replacement for Grant Park's decades-old Petrillo Music Shell, which had a long history of hosting free music events and was named after James C. Petrillo, a labor union leader who started free concerts in Grant Park. When the original bandshell was replaced and relocated a bit further north in Grant Park in 1978, the new structure retained the Petrillo name. In the early 2000s decade, the Petrillo family said naming the new music shell in Millennium Park after Jay Pritzker ignored Petrillo's legacy, and threatened legal action.

As of 2009, the Petrillo Music Shell was still in use, though Chicago Tribune arts critic Howard Reich described it as "dilapidated" and "dismal".

Controversies during construction involved escalating costs and delays; both the pavilion and park opened four years later than originally planned and cost millions of dollars more than expected.

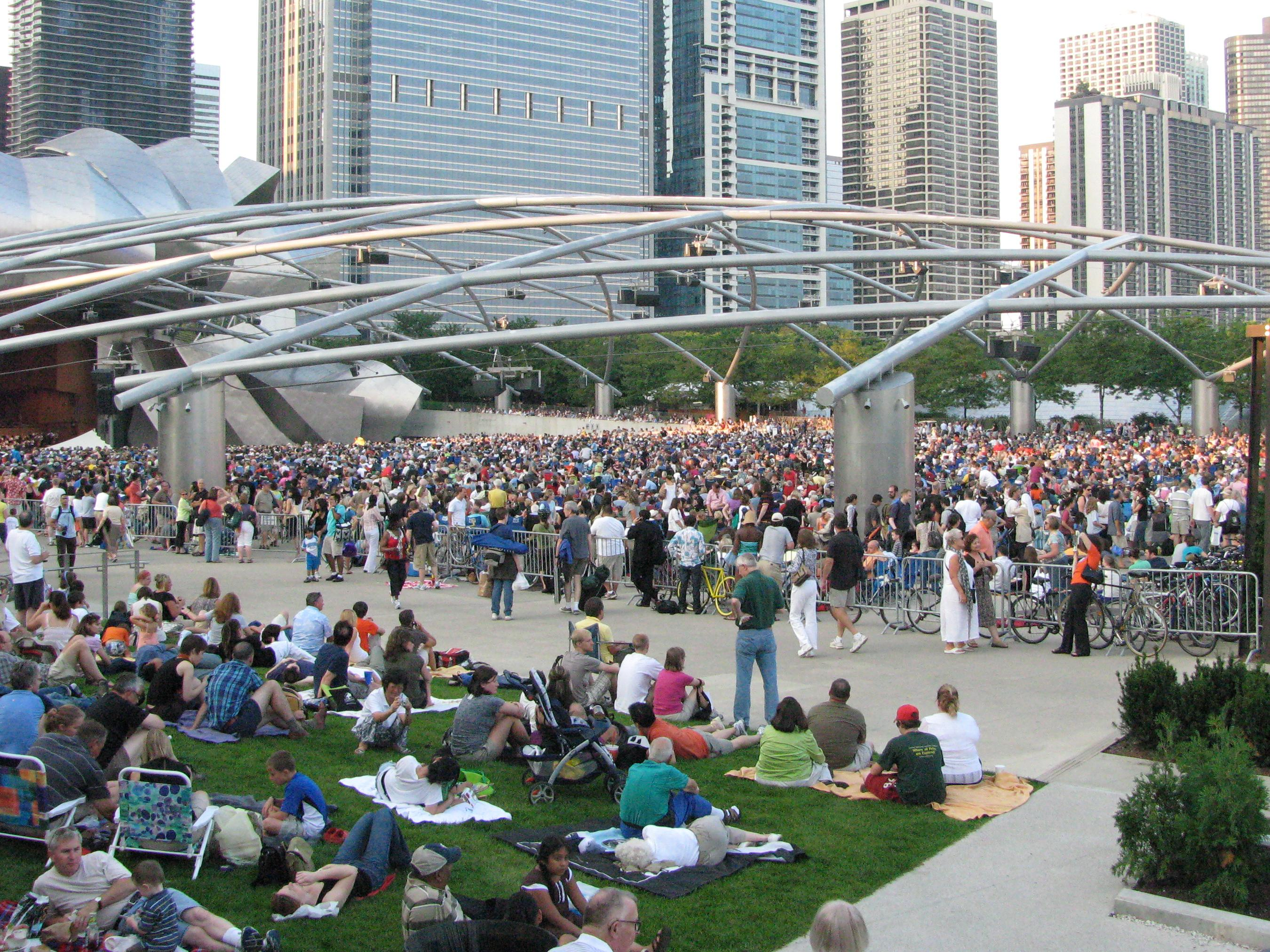
Enjoying Beethoven's 9th Symphony in the pavilion and beyond (Nichols Bridgeway view)

Once the pavilion was built, the initial plan was that the lawn seating would be free for all events. An early brochure for the Grant Park Music Festival said "You never need a ticket to attend a concert! The lawn and the general seating section are always admission free." However, when parking revenue fell short of estimates during the first year, the city charged $10 for lawn seating at the August 31, 2005, concert by Tori Amos. Amos, a classically trained musician who chose only piano and organ accompaniment for her concert, earned positive reviews as the inaugural rock and roll performer in a venue that regularly hosts classical music. The city justified the charge by contending that since the Pavilion is an open-air venue, there were many places in Millennium Park, such as the Cloud Gate, Crown Fountain and Lurie Gardens, where one could have enjoyed the sounds or the atmosphere of the park without having to pay.

In addition to charging for lawn seating, the event promoters prohibited concertgoers from bringing beverages, including bottled water, to the lawn; drinks instead had to be purchased onsite. The city later stated that confiscation of unopened beverage bottles was a mistake and that "Bottled water is always allowed at the free concerts we host at the park, and will be allowed at any future events as well." An estimated 300 attendees set up blankets beyond the trellis system, where they could enjoy their own beverages while listening to the concert. The official Chicago policy is that alcohol is permitted throughout Jay Pritzker Pavilion during public performances, but cans and glass bottles are not permitted on the Great Lawn. During the concert, the Gehry-designed BP Pedestrian Bridge that connects Millennium Park with Daley Bicentennial Plaza was closed until 7:00 a.m. the next day.

== Events ==
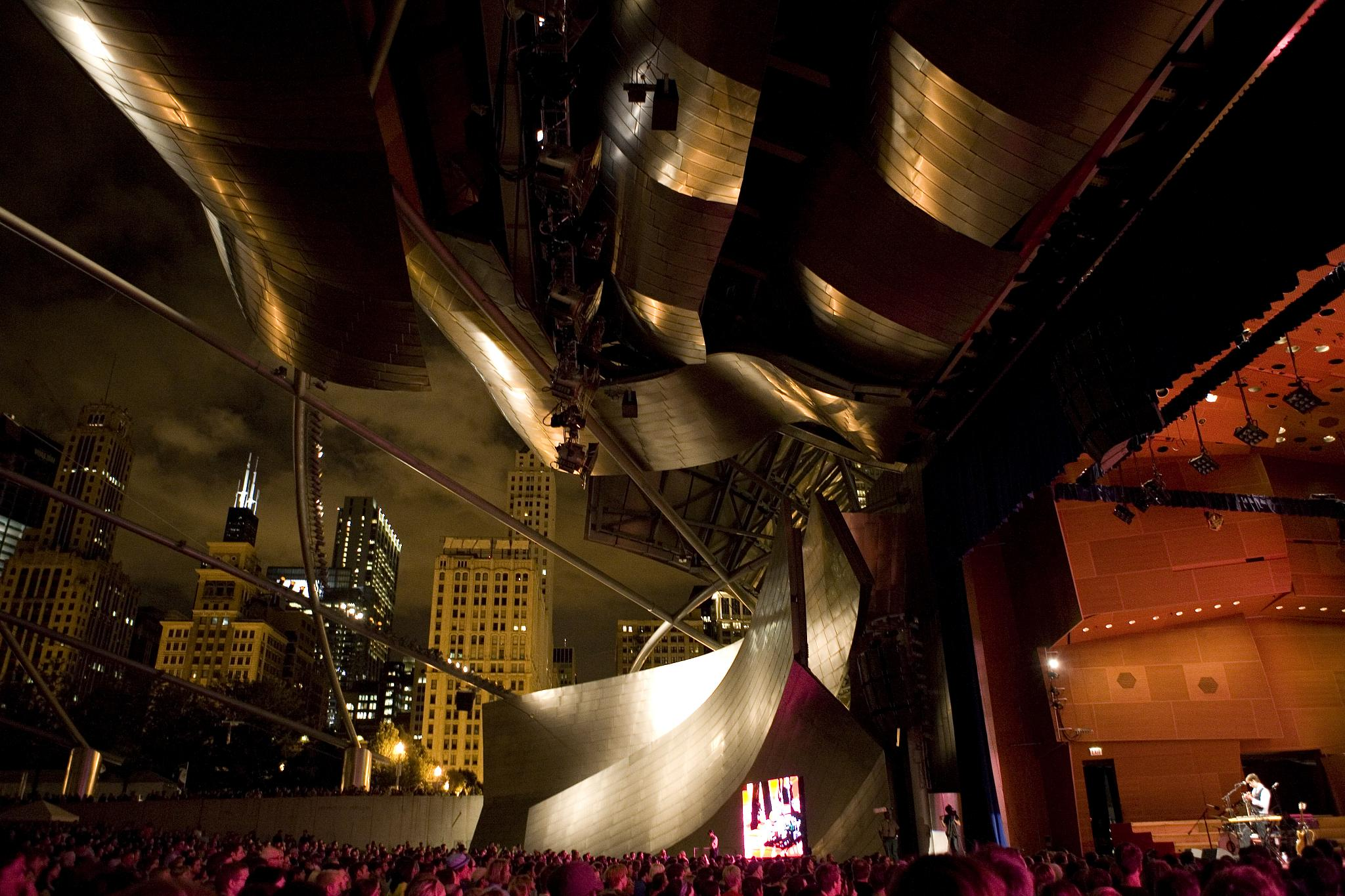
Andrew Bird performed at the pavilion in September 2008.

Jay Pritzker Pavilion competes with Ravinia Park as a Chicago area outdoor music venue. The pavilion hosts free music events such as Chicago Gospel Music Festival from spring to fall. In June, July and August, the Grammy-nominated Grant Park Orchestra and Chorus performs free classical concerts at the Grant Park Music Festival. The festival, a Chicago tradition since 1931, remains the nation's only free, outdoor classical music series. Although the Music Festival shares pavilion space with several other program series and annual performances, its concerts most Wednesday, Friday and Saturday evenings throughout the heart of the summer are the core of the pavilion's offerings. Travel guide Frommer's lists the park, pavilion, and these free concerts as some of the best free things to do in Chicago. In summer the pavilion also hosts a series of jazz concerts, and the Great Lawn hosts yoga and pilates workouts on Saturday mornings.

The Pritzker Prize presentation ceremony, which moves to an architecturally significant location each year, was held in the Pritzker Pavilion in April 2005. Among the annual performers at the pavilion are Steppenwolf Theatre, Lyric Opera of Chicago and the Chicago Symphony Orchestra (CSO). At the end of the Grant Park Music Festival season in August, the Festival's Grant Park Orchestra and Carlos Kalmar presented Pulitzer Prize-winning composer John Adams' On the Transmigration of Souls, which was written at the request of the New York Philharmonic to honor the victims of the September 11 attacks. On Sunday September 11, 2005, United States Senator Barack Obama (who was later elected President of the United States) served as guest narrator for a 9/11 tribute concert by the CSO. The focal work of the concert was Aaron Copland's "Lincoln Portrait" and the concert was led by former CSO resident conductor William Eddins.

Hosted events

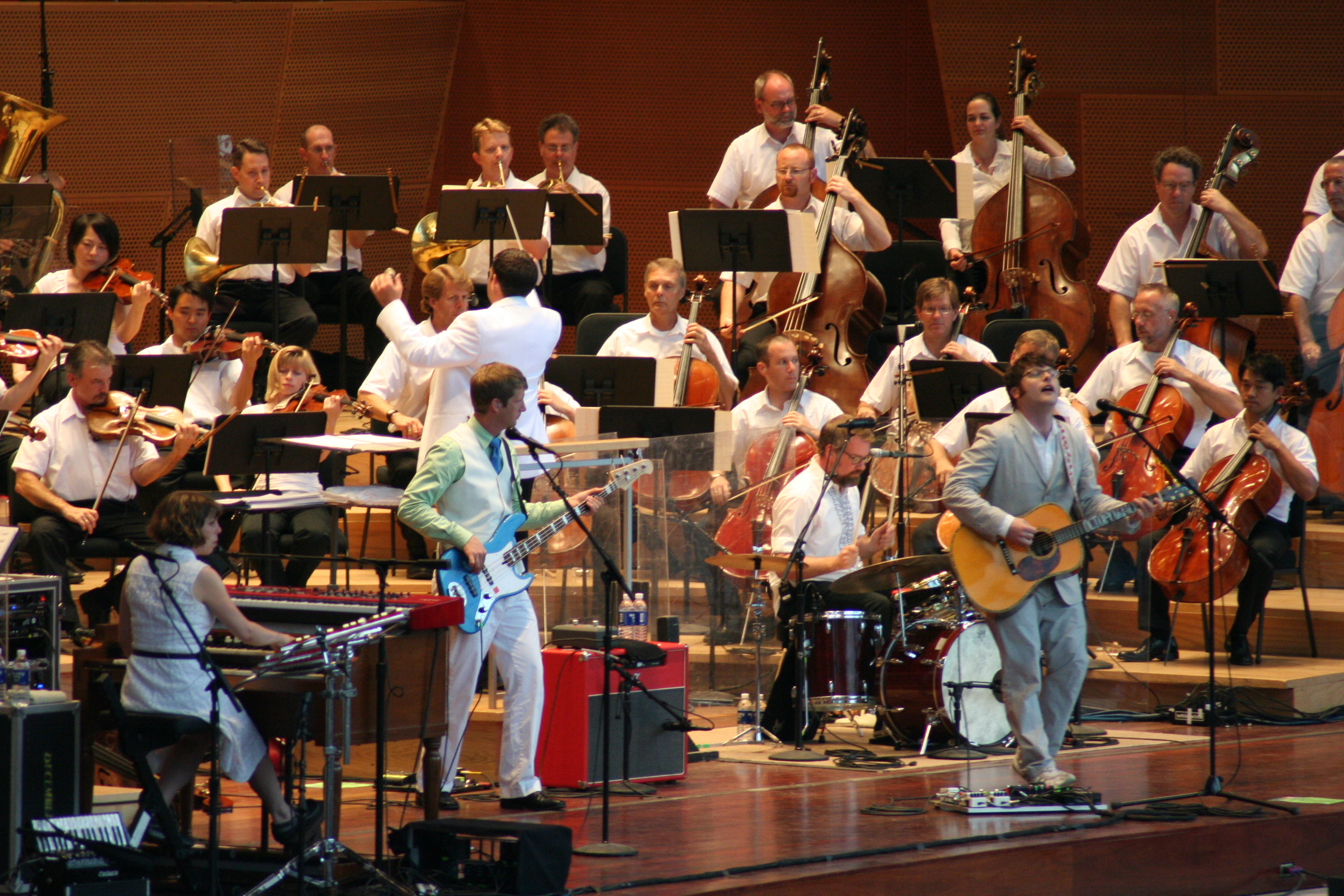
The Decemberists played a free concert with the Grant Park Orchestra on July 18, 2007.

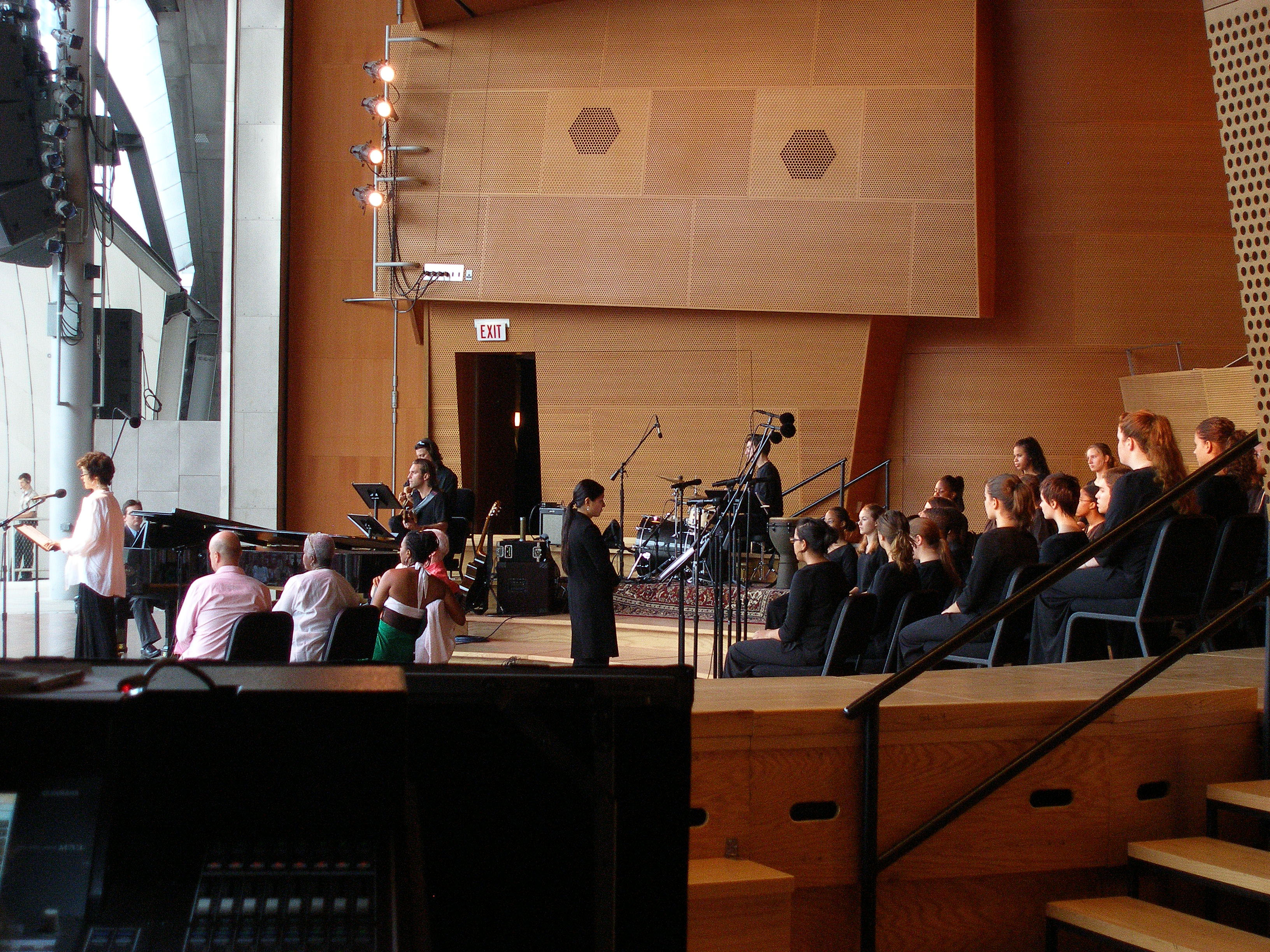
Chicago Children's Choir backstage at Jay Pritzker Pavilion

Although it was built as a replacement for Grant Park's outdoor concert facilities, larger annual events such as the Chicago Blues and Chicago Jazz Festivals and Taste of Chicago are too large for Jay Pritzker Pavilion and continue to be held in and around Petrillo Music Shell. The pavilion has hosted smaller festivals, such as the Chicago Gospel Music Festival, since 2005. Public opinion has been in favor of moving some of the smaller Blues and Jazz festival events to the pavilion, with its better, more modern acoustics. By 2009, as the city grappled with a budget deficit, it considered realigning parts of the larger festivals and made definite plans to move some of the smaller ones to the more modern venue.

On July 18, 2007, the Grant Park Music Festival partnered with the Metro Chicago to produce a free Wednesday-night show celebrating Metro's 25th anniversary and featuring indie band The Decemberists with the Grant Park Orchestra. The show featured new orchestral arrangements of The Decemberists' songs by Sean O'Loughlin, who also conducted in lieu of Kalmar. While the concert was free, the front seating sections were reserved for season membership holders; fans of the band got the remaining seats or sat on the lawn. This led Decemberists' frontman Colin Meloy to encourage the crowd to breach the barriers between the seats and Great Lawn to get closer to the stage for the band's encore performance, which was without the orchestra. Estimated attendance was 11,000 to 15,000, the largest for any free concert at the pavilion to date.

Other events include a concert by Wilco on September 12, 2007, the "Poland for Chicago" show with Polish President Lech Kaczyński on September 25, 2007, and a global warming awareness festival which culminated in a performance entitled Arctic at the pavilion in November 2007. Most events at the pavilion remain free; the only public event at the pavilion in the summer of 2008 that charged admission was a concert by Rogue Wave and Death Cab for Cutie on June 3. The pavilion has hosted several one-day events that were noted in international publications, including the United States debut of A Throw of Dice, a 1929 Indian silent movie about two kings with a common love interest, on July 30, 2008. At the debut, Nitin Sawhney and the Grant Park Orchestra accompanied the movie with a live performance. Oprah Winfrey filmed the September 8, 2008, season-opening Oprah Winfrey Show on September 3, 2008, at the pavilion with more than 150 Olympic medalists, including Michael Phelps, Nastia Liukin, Dara Torres, Kobe Bryant, Misty May-Treanor and Kerri Walsh, in an effort to rally support for the Chicago 2016 Olympic bid.

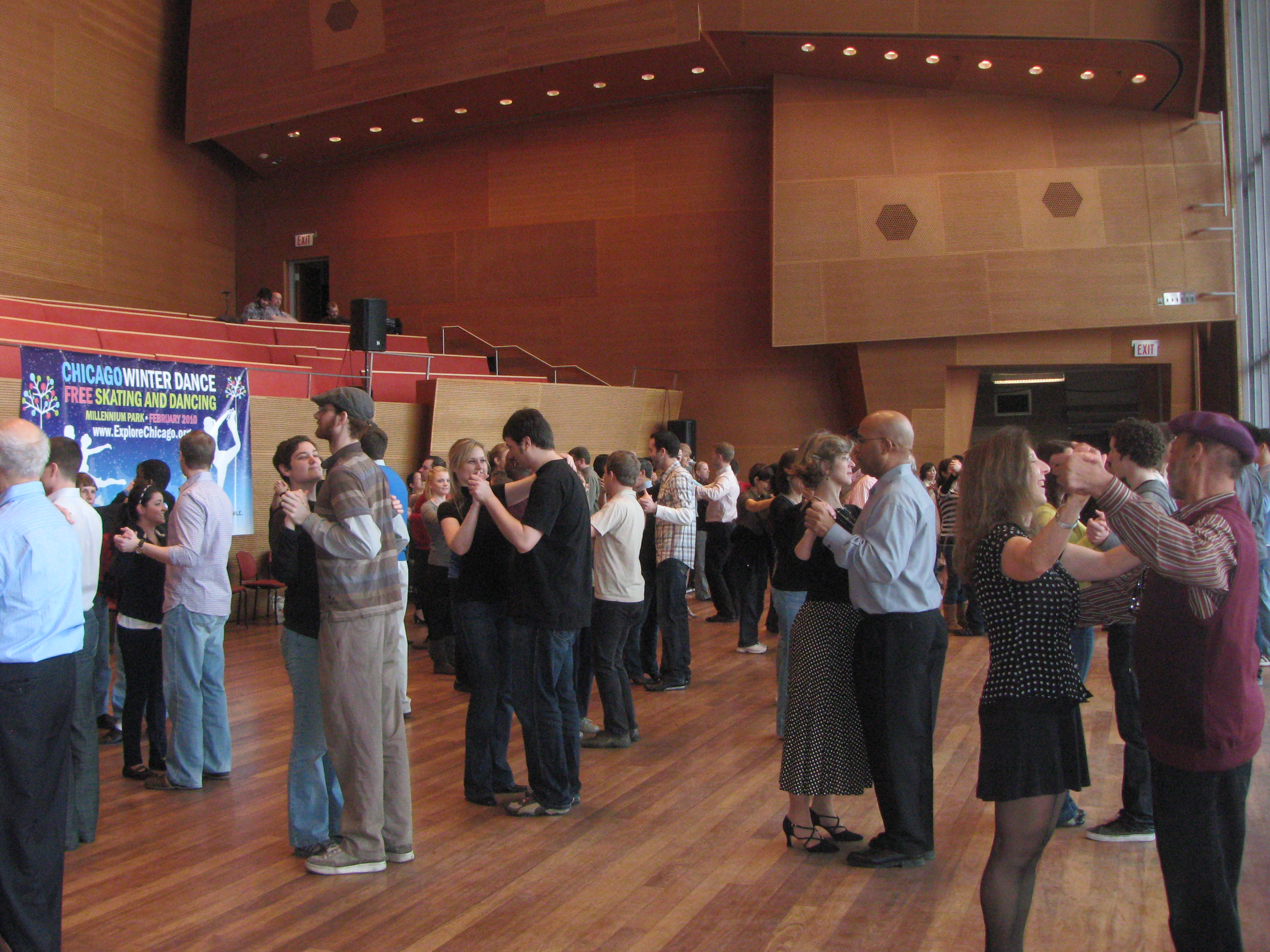
Chicago Winter Dance participants

Concerts performed by the Grant Park Orchestra and directed by Kalmar were part of a June 19, 2009, citywide Burnham Plan centennial celebration that included the unveiling of the Burnham Pavilions elsewhere in the park. The concert featured the world premiere of Michael Torke's work for symphony and chorus entitled Plans, paired with Rachmaninoff's Piano Concerto No. 3. Also, the pavilion serves as host to the annual Chicago Winter Dance Festival. During the festival there is a month of free dance instructions behind the glass doors of the pavilion stage and free skating instruction at the McCormick Tribune Plaza & Ice Rink.

Among the highlights of the 2010 calendar is the screening of the BBC's nature documentary Planet Earth Live on July 21, with live Grant Park Symphony Orchestra accompaniment featuring the score by five-time Academy Award-nominated composer George Fenton, who serves as conductor.

Among the artists who performed with the festival at the pavilion in the 2000s decade are sopranos Karina Gauvin and Erin Wall, tenor Vittorio Grigolo, pianist Stephen Hough, violinists Rachel Barton Pine, James Ehnes, Roby Lakatos, Christian Tetzlaff, and Pinchas Zukerman, and vocalists Otis Clay, Mariza, and Maria del Mar Bonet. All rehearsals at the pavilion are open to the public and well-attended. The festival is represented by a staff of trained guides, called docents, that field questions and provide educational talks during the rehearsals.

Besides these public functions, the pavilion is available, as is the entire park, as a venue for private events year-round. The stage's glass and steel doors enable it to provide indoor space protected from the elements when necessary. In addition, the pavilion has a Choral Rehearsal Room that can be rented.

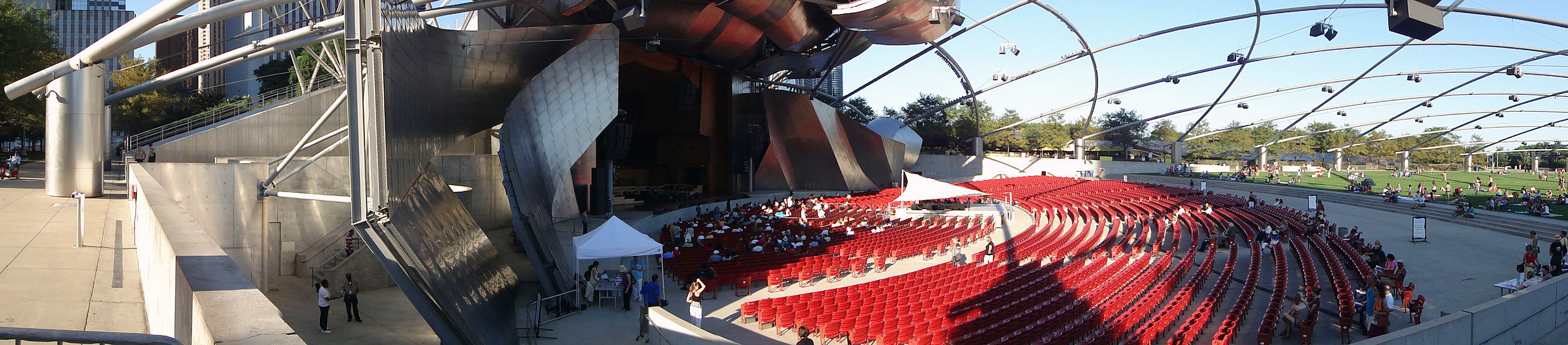
Panoramic shot of the Jay Pritzker Pavilion, showing the stage area to the garden seating area.

== Reception ==
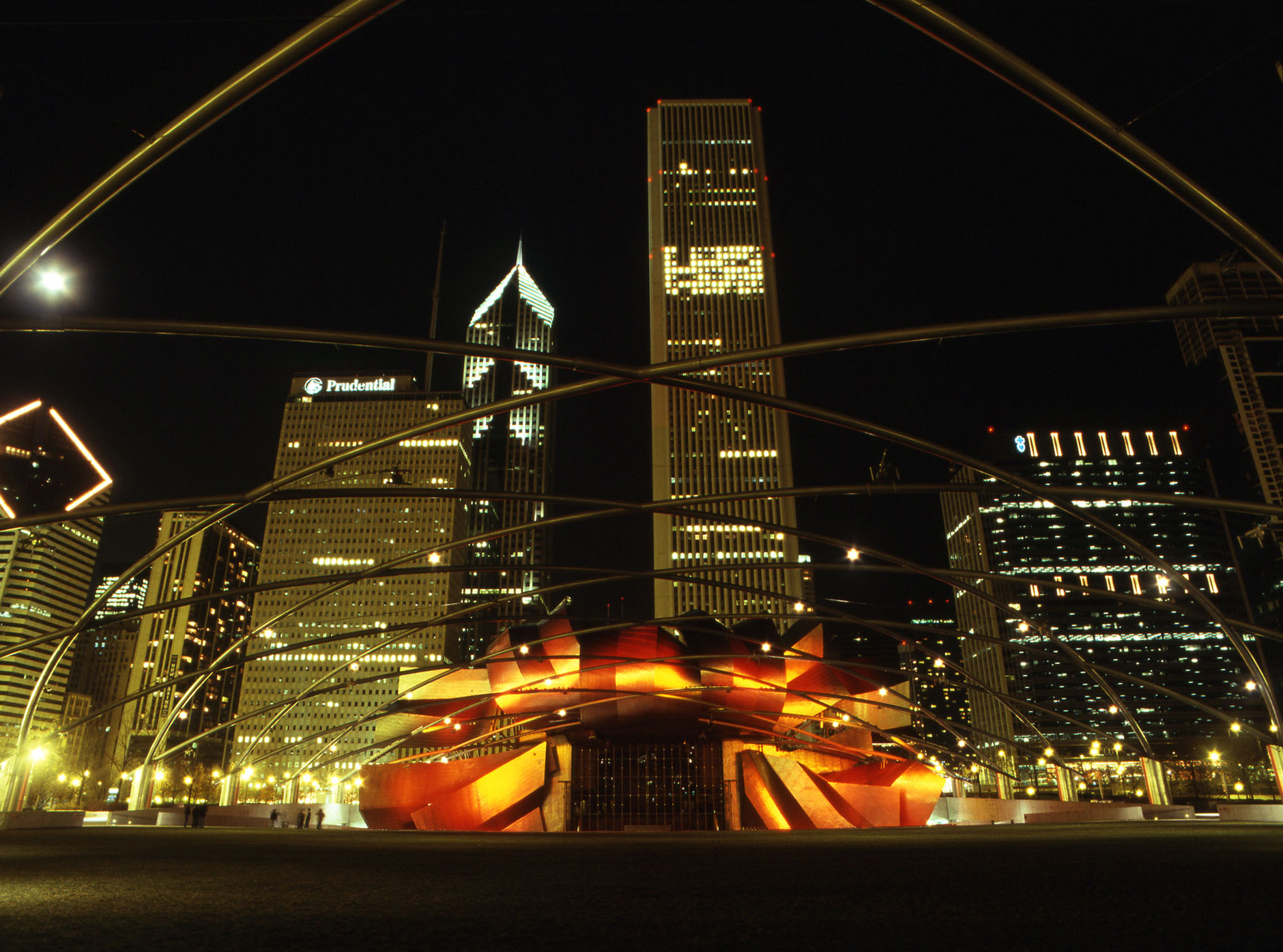
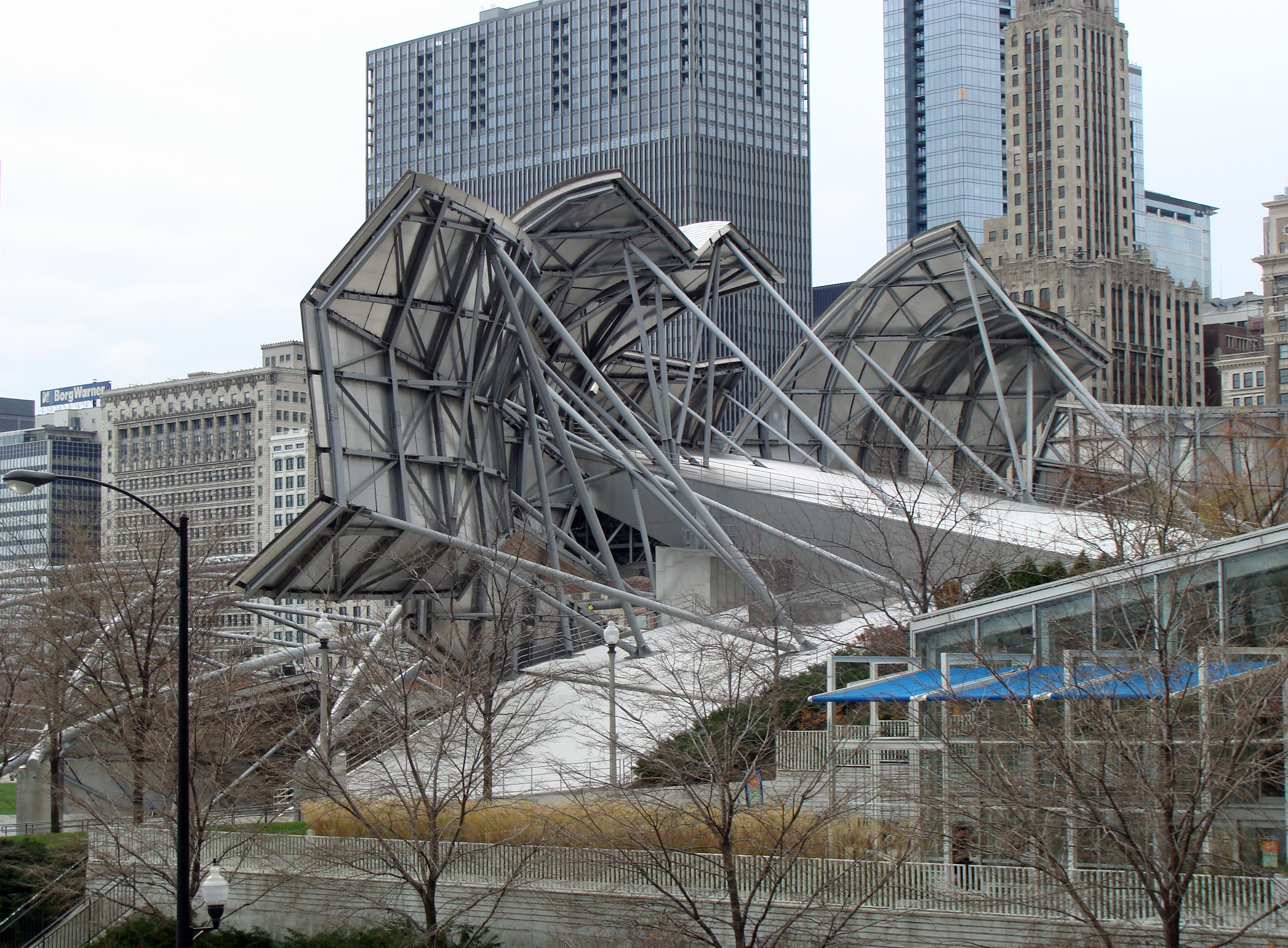
While most critics have praised the pavilion (top, at night), others have criticized its exposed beams and angular shapes (bottom).

Critics have said that Jay Pritzker Pavilion is the highlight of Millennium Park. Fodor's travel guide described it as the park's "showstopper" and "stunning", praising its stainless steel and sound system, as well as the variety of events it hosts. Time called the pavilion "dynamic" and recommended it as one of two must-see attractions in the park, while one New York Times writer found herself standing "agog" at what appeared to her to be a "celestial gateway to another universe" and a frame for the sky. Lonely Planet travel guide called the pavilion the anchor of the park, and the 2004 Year in Review issue of Time described it as the park's crown jewel. USA Today described the bandshell as a landmark and the centerpiece of Millennium Park. Another critic described the pavilion as the "most spectacular structure to go up in early-twenty-first-century Chicago".

According to the Financial Times, the bandshell's acoustics are unparalleled compared to any contemporary outdoor venue. Critics say that musicians have lauded the onstage acoustics. Another Financial Times critic noted that Gehry revisited some of his past design motifs, such as his use of stainless steel, and explored new ones such as the trellis and sound system. This sentiment was echoed by others. During the opening concert von Rhein noted that the sound is not of uniform quality throughout the venue and opined that the optimal sonics are toward the back of the seated area and front of the lawn. However, he subsequently noted in 2005 "the system has been fine-tuned over the past two summers and now delivers a warm, even approximation of concert-hall sound to listeners at even the farthest reaches of the lawn.

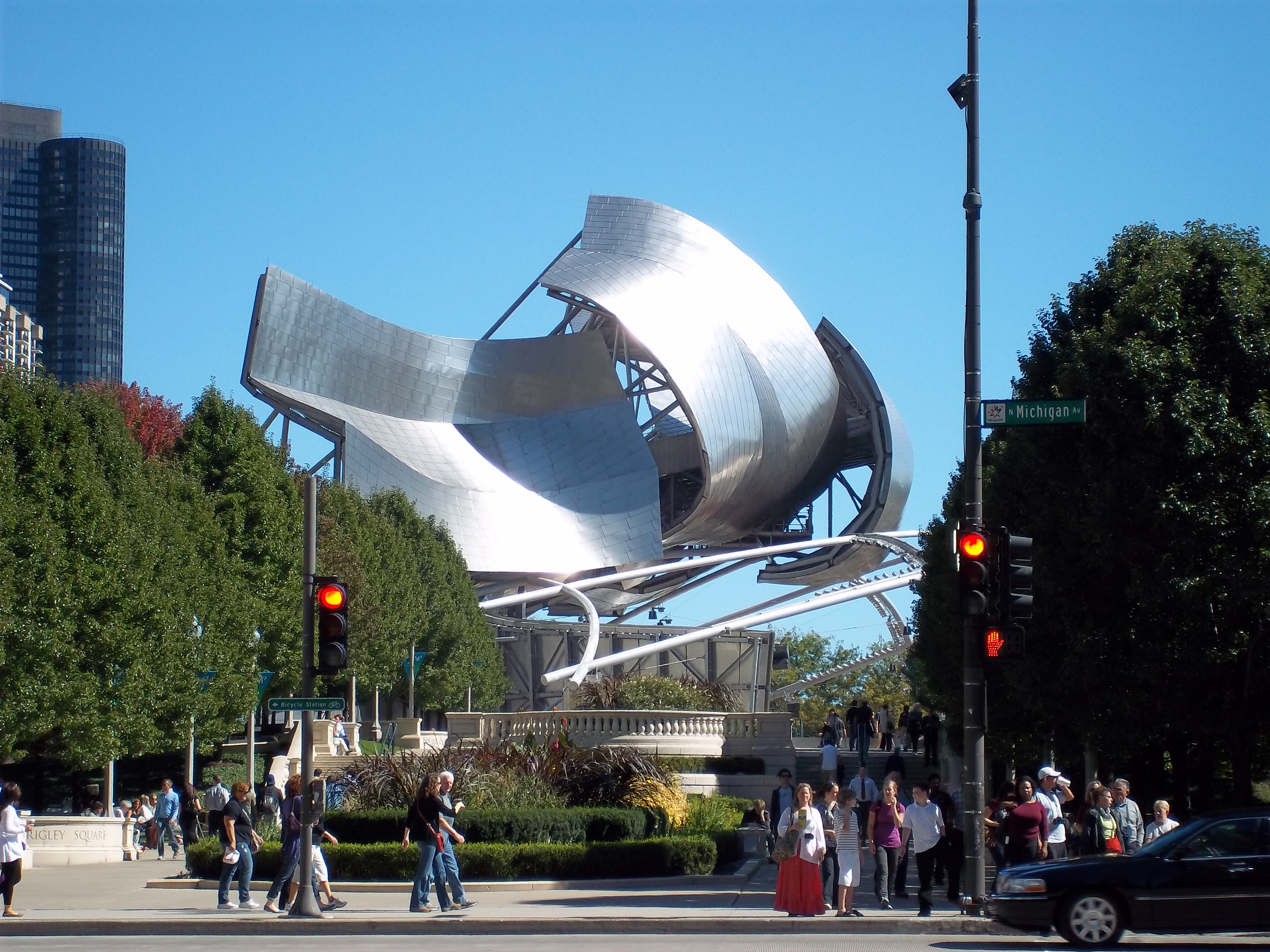
From Michigan Avenue

Despite the praise it has received, the pavilion has its blemishes: the supporting north side of the structure along Randolph Street has attracted criticism for not being pleasing to the eye, and some observers found the exposed supporting proscenium braces offensive. Critic Fred Bernstein of The New York Times felt that the smooth rounded trellis and sharp-edged bandshell were geometrically discordant. A review in the Chicago Tribune criticized the "ugly concrete structure" surrounding the mixing console in the midst of the fixed seats as the pavilion's "biggest design miscalculation", and called for it be moved. Although modern practice is to locate the sound console in with the audience, Gehry said at a symposium after the park's opening that he wanted "to scrap the big box of a sound booth that sprang up like a weed in the center of the pavilion's seating". The director of Millennium Park was honored for his contribution to creating "one of the most accessible parks – not just in the United States but possibly the world" in a 2005 accessibility award ceremony held at the pavilion. The pavilion's stage is reached by gently sloped ramps instead of stairs, as part of the park's overall accessibility design. The decision to save money and not slope the Great Lawn as much as originally planned was not universally popular. However, Gehry said that the actual slope of the lawn was more accommodating to people with disabilities and better able to accommodate activities than the original plan.

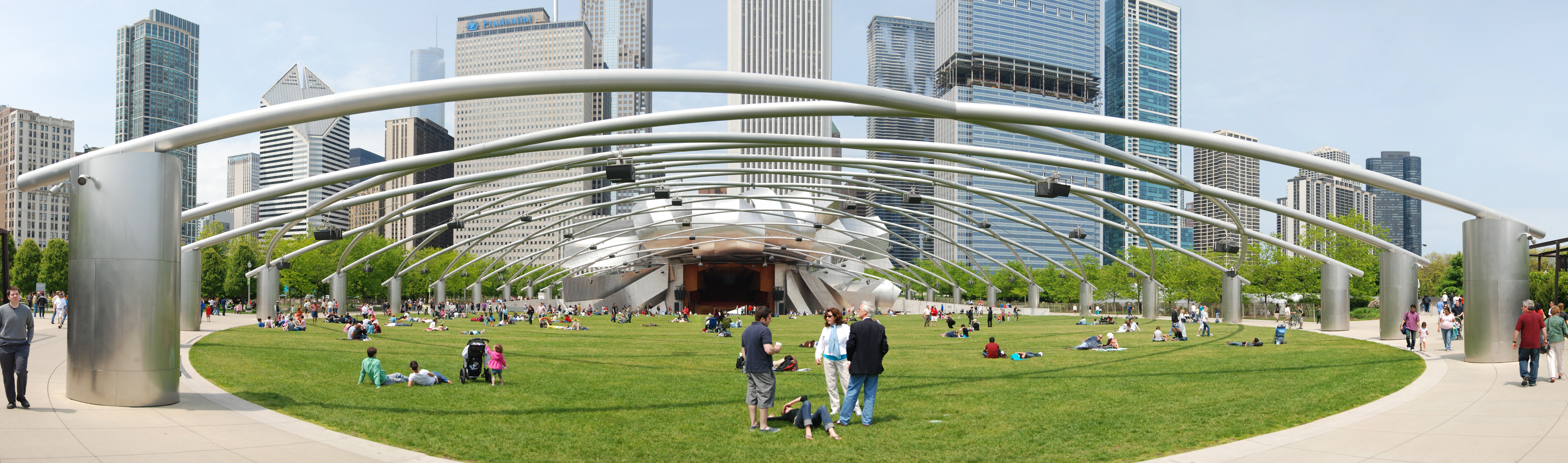
Panoramic view of the Great Lawn, trellis, and bandshell at Jay Pritzker Pavilion in May 2009. Among the buildings pictured in the background are (left to right) The Heritage, Smurfit-Stone Building, Trump International Hotel and Tower, One Prudential Plaza, Two Prudential Plaza, Aon Center, Aqua, Blue Cross Blue Shield Tower, 340 on the Park, The Buckingham, 400 East Randolph, and Harbor Point.

== Position in Chicago's skyline ==
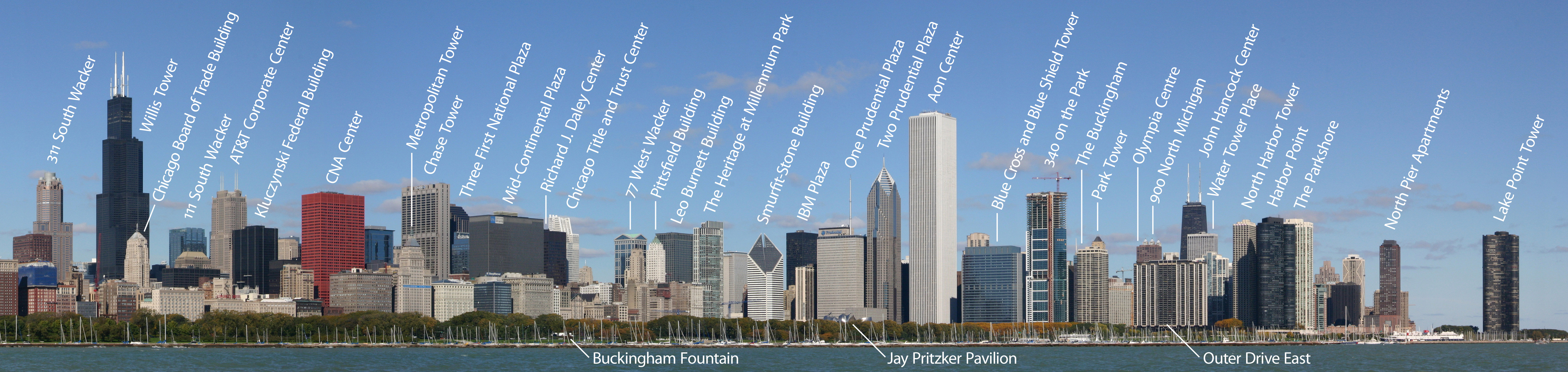

== See also ==
- List of works by Frank Gehry
