= Ketterson =

Ketterson is a surname. Notable people with the surname include:

- Ellen Ketterson, American biologist
- Mark Thomas Ketterson (born 1954), American performing arts critic and writer
- Zak Ketterson (born 1997), American cross-country skier
