= Erika Davidson =

American photographer

- Born: Dagmar Erika Lier; July 19, 1926; Frankfurt, Germany
- Died: March 21, 2007 (aged 80); New York City
- Occupation: Photographer
- Spouse: Arthur Davidson (m 1952)

Erika Davidson (July 19, 1926 – March 21, 2007) was an American photographer of German birth who specialized in photographing live theatre.

Born in Frankfurt, she immigrated to the US, arriving June 28, 1951 on the SS America. Davidson began her career working for the Metropolitan Opera Guild's education department in the 1950s. She began contributing photos to Opera News magazine in 1965, becoming one of the magazine's most frequently published photographers for more than the next 25 years. She left the staff of the Metropolitan Opera Guild in the early 1970s to work as a freelance photographer but continued to specialize in photographing performances at the Met in addition to capturing other stage performances. She died in New York City at the age of 80.
