= Joel Honig =

American musician (1936–2003)

Joel Honig (October 13, 1936 – September 25, 2003) was an American music critic, copy editor, writer, and pianist. He is best remembered for his extensive contributions to Opera News.

== Biography ==
Born October 13, 1936, in Chicago, Honig studied piano at the Manhattan School of Music before entering Columbia University where he was part of a social group of young men that included composer John Corigliano and theatre director Michael Kahn. During his junior year he studied French literature at the Sorbonne in Paris. He was a close friend of playwright William M. Hoffman whom he met at a bar in Greenwich Village in the 1950s. Hoffman said of the event, "I was dead drunk, reciting a Jean Genet poem in French at the top of my lungs, and Joel came up to me and finished the poem. And we became fast friends."

In the late 1950s, Honig served as the personal secretary of composer Gian Carlo Menotti, notably working with him when he founded the Festival dei Due Mondi in 1958. Around that same time he began working as a freelance writer and music critic. He notably was a regular contributor to Opera News magazine for 40 years. In the 1960s, he served as the rehearsal accompanist and concert pianist for the Harkness Ballet and also worked in the studios of many of the era's leading ballet instructors. He even attempted, unsuccessfully, to teach Rebekah Harkness to play the piano. He later worked for 19 years as a copy editor for Charles Scribner's Sons. He barely contained a fantastic intellect within a searing wit. There were few subjects, and few people, he had no opinion about. A longtime friend of Raymond Guy Wilson, Juilliard graduate, also of Harkness House, and Director of Music for the National Academy of Dance. He led a life of loyalty to old friends, contempt of stupidity, and grudging hope in the improvement of Mankind. Quote: "Expectations are very limited".
