= Jochen Breiholz =

German opera manager

Jochen Breiholz is a German opera manager who has worked internationally, in Riga, Antwerp, Theater an der Wien in Vienna, and from 2021 at the Opéra National de Lyon.

== Life and career ==
Born in Oldenburg, Germany, Breiholz studied literature, theatre, musicology and art history at Free University of Berlin. In 1988 he did an internship at Opera News in New York City which led to an assignment as a freelance writer for the magazine. He worked for Opera News as a music critic, reporting mainly on the European opera scene. In 1996, Breiholz became a frequent contributor for Opernwelt magazine in Berlin, contributing until 2004. From 1997 until 2002 he worked as a writer and editor of the Arts section for the German daily newspaper Die Welt.

In 2002 Breiholz moved back to New York and worked as a correspondent for several European publications, reporting on opera, classical music concerts, and theatre. He has written articles for the British magazine Opera Now, the German magazine Rondo, The Wall Street Journal Europe and the Swiss magazine Musik & Theater, among other publications. He has also worked as an interviewer for classical music radio programs. In 2005 he became Artistic Consultant of the Latvian National Opera in Riga, and in 2006 Artistic Director of the company. From 2011 until 2016 he was the Director of Artistic Administration and Casting at the Vlaamse Opera. (now known as Opera Ballet Vlaanderen) in Antwerp, Belgium. In early 2016 he was appointed Director of Artistic Administration and Casting at Theater an der Wien in Vienna,. In 2021 he left Vienna for Lyon where he is the Director of Casting and Artistic Administration and Planning at the Opéra National de Lyon.
