= Erin Wall =

Canadian-American operatic soprano (1975–2020)

Erin Marie Wall (November 4, 1975 – October 8, 2020) was a Canadian-American operatic soprano who had an active international career from 2001 until her death of breast cancer in 2020. Chiefly associated with the Lyric Opera of Chicago, the Vancouver-based soprano appeared with the company in fourteen productions from 2001 through 2018. She was particularly admired for her performances in the operas of Mozart and Strauss, and performed leading roles as a guest artist at important houses, including the Metropolitan Opera, La Scala, and the Paris Opera.

== Life and career ==
Born in Calgary, Alberta to American parents, Wall studied at the Vancouver Academy of Music, Western Washington University, Rice University and Music Academy of the West and was a finalist at the BBC Cardiff Singer of the World competition in 2003.

Following graduation from the Lyric Opera of Chicago's Lyric Opera Center for American Artists, she was engaged for three seasons with the company. She made her professional opera debut with the company as the First Nursemaid in Kurt Weill's Street Scene in 2001. Making a significant impression as the understudy for Karita Mattila, she appeared in Chicago on opening night in September 2004 as Donna Anna in Don Giovanni, filling in for Karita Mattila. Mark Thomas Ketterson of Opera News said "(she) sang gloriously..defiantly launching her voluminous soprano through the fabric of the ensembles and coursing through the coloratura with precision and verve. ... .This was as beautifully vocalized a Donna Anna as one is likely to encounter today". Opera Today expressed similar enthusiasm.

Wall's other leading roles with the Lyric Opera of Chicago included Marguerite in Faust (2003); Freia in Das Rheingold (2004, 2005); Gerhilde in Die Walküre (2002, 2005); Pamina in The Magic Flute (2005); Fiordiligi in Così fan tutte (2007); Konstanze in Die Entführung aus dem Serail (2009); Helena in the Lyric premiere of Britten's A Midsummer Night's Dream (2010); Antonia in the Tales of Hoffmann (2011) and Elettra in Idomeneo (2018).

In July 2002 she made her international debut in Britten's War Requiem with the London Symphony Orchestra conducted by Andrew Davis at the St Paul's Cathedral.

At the 2006 Mostly Mozart Festival in New York she caught the attention of Alex Ross who noted that "Erin Wall, a young Canadian, sang "Bella mia fiamma ... Resta, o cara" (Mozart) with grace and fire, showing the sort of righteous rage that would make for a great Donna Anna. I hope someone from the Met was taking notes". Internationally, she has appeared in Paris, Aix-en-Provence and Vienna.

During the 2007 summer festival season of the Santa Fe Opera she sang the role of Daphne in Richard Strauss' Daphne: "Erin Wall took on the leading role, a perilous undertaking for a soprano still early in her career, but she displayed an impressive command of Strauss's taxing music". This was followed by the role of Donna Anna in Don Giovanni at the Washington National Opera in late October/November 2007: "Erin Wall was a sympathetic Donna Anna who fleshed out the character with a truly noble bearing and filled out the melodic lines with a combination of steel and sweetness. Sure coloratura and incisive phrasing (including hairpin shifts of dynamics) completed the impressive vocal package." Wall later returned to the Santa Fe Opera to portray the title heroines in productions of Richard Strauss's Arabella (2012) and Samuel Barber’s Vanessa (2016).

On 13 April 2009, Erin Wall made her debut at the Metropolitan Opera in New York as Donna Anna in Don Giovanni to critical acclaim. She later returned to the company to sing Strauss's Arabella and Britten's Helena.

On 24 July 2011, Erin Wall sang along with legendary bass-baritone Ruggero Raimondi at the opening of the Gran Teatro Nacional, in Lima, Peru.

In 2017 and 2019 Bergen Philharmonic Orchestra, under the direction of Ed Gardner, toured with Benjamin Britten's Peter Grimes in Bergen, Oslo, Edinburgh and London. Erin Wall sang the part of Ellen Orford, opposite Stuart Skelton's titular character.

Wall also appeared in leading roles with the Aix-en-Provence Festival, the Atlanta Opera, Arizona Opera, Bayerische Staatsoper, Calgary Opera, Canadian Opera Company, Den Norske Opera, Edinburgh Festival, La Scala, Los Angeles Opera, Michigan Opera Theatre, Minnesota Opera, Municipal Theatre of Santiago, Pacific Opera Victoria, Paris Opéra, Théâtre du Châtelet, Theater an der Wien, Vancouver Opera, and Wiener Staatsoper.

Wall died at age 44 on October 8, 2020, from complications caused by metastatic breast cancer. She is survived by her parents; her husband, Roberto Mauro, the director of artistic planning at the Canadian Opera Company in Toronto; their children, Michael and Julia; and her sister, Shannon.
