= Mark Thomas Ketterson =

- Born: 1954 (age 71–72); Nashville, Tennessee
- Education: Vanderbilt University and University of Illinois
- Occupations: Author, performing arts commentator and critic
- Spouse: John N. Fliszar
- Writing career
- Subject: Arts Journalism

Mark Thomas Ketterson (born 1954, Nashville, Tennessee) is an American performing arts critic and writer. He is the Chicago correspondent for Opera News magazine, and has also written for Playbill, the Chicago Tribune, the Atlanta Journal-Constitution, and Chicago (magazine) as well as Concertonet.com, ArtsATL, and Chicago on the Aisle. Ketterson studied drama and psychology at Vanderbilt University and music at Peabody College, Vanderbilt's Blair Academy of Music, and later at Chicago Musical College at Roosevelt University. He trained at Actor's Theatre of Louisville and became involved with Chicago's St. Nicholas Theatre and various national tours. He then completed his graduate study in mental health at the University of Illinois at Chicago and worked as a clinical social worker before focusing on arts journalism. Ketterson is a regular contributor and annotator for the publications of performing arts organizations throughout the United States, including Lyric Opera of Chicago, The Metropolitan Opera Guild, Houston Grand Opera, Washington National Opera at Kennedy Center, the Chicago Symphony Orchestra, the Ravinia Festival, and Wolf Trap National Park for the Performing Arts. He has lectured extensively on theatre, opera, and arts education, and has profiled such disparate artists as conductor Riccardo Muti, Bobby McFerrin, Patti LuPone, Paul Gemignani, and Sir James Galway.

== See also ==
- Erin Wall
- Marlis Petersen
- Opera News
- Vladimir Galouzine
