= Brian Kellow =

American biographer (1959–2018)

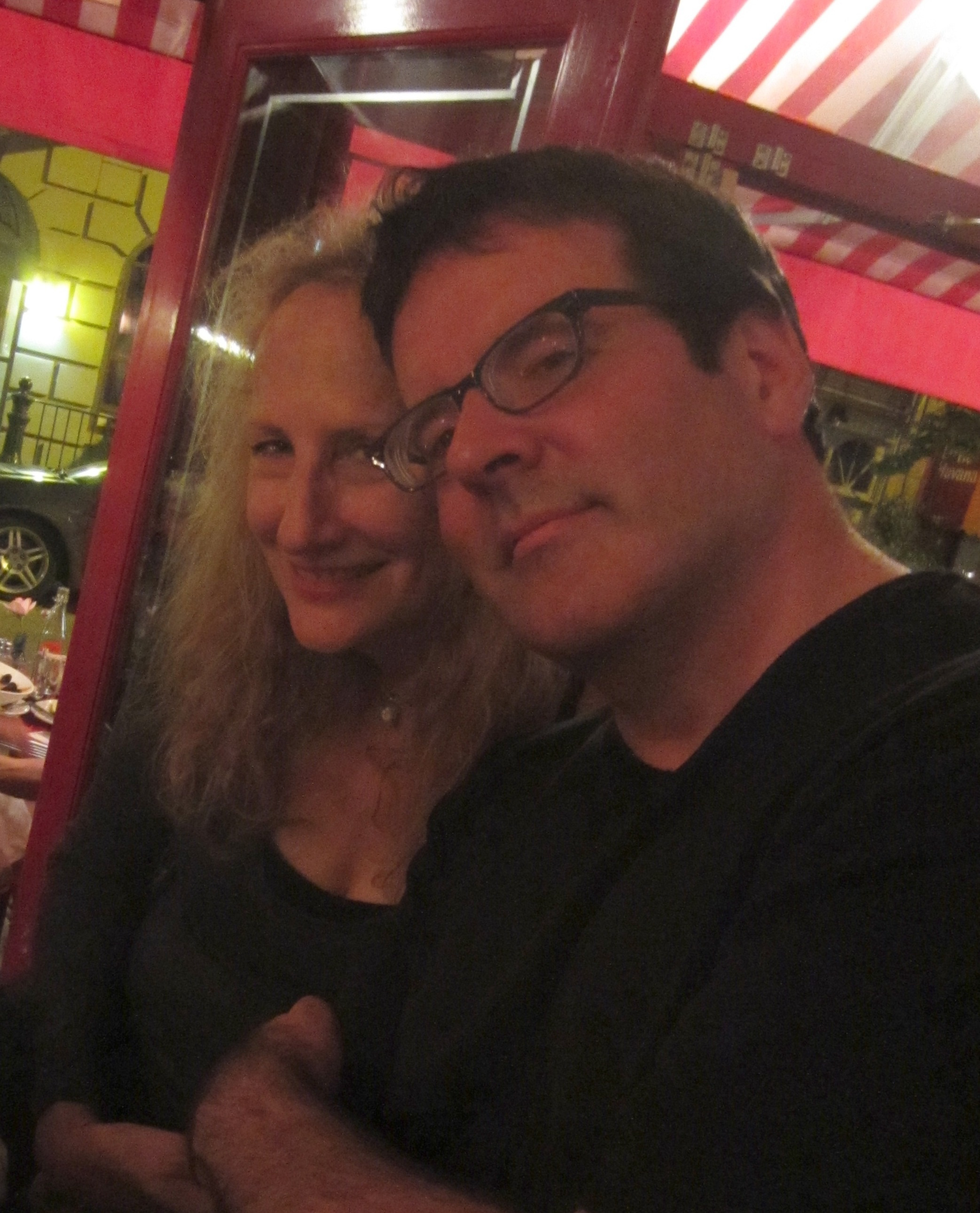
- Kellow at Cornelia Street
- Born: March 1, 1959
- Died: July 22, 2018 (aged 59)
- Education: Oregon State University
- Occupations: Biographer and magazine editor
- Spouse: Scott Barnes

Brian Kellow (March 1, 1959 – July 22, 2018) was an American biographer and magazine editor. As an editor at Opera News from 1988 to 2016, he commissioned hundreds of articles from a range of writers, seeking out well-known voices and cultivating young talent. In addition to his monthly column in Opera News, his own articles appeared in Vanity Fair, The Wall Street Journal, The New York Observer, Opera, and other publications.

He was the author of five biographies: Can't Help Singing: The Life of Eileen Farrell, published in 2000, The Bennetts: An Acting Family, Ethel Merman: A Life, Pauline Kael: A Life in the Dark, and Can I Go Now? The Life of Sue Mengers, Hollywood's First Superagent.

Kellow was married to Scott Barnes and at the time of his death lived in Florida and New York.
