= Opera News =

American classical music magazine (1936–2023)

- The cover of the March 2020 issue, featuring soprano Diana Damrau
- Editor-in-Chief: M. Ndimande
- Categories: Classical music/Opera
- Frequency: monthly
- Total circulation: 51,578 (2018)
- First issue: 1936
- Final issue: 2023
- Company: Metropolitan Opera Guild
- Country: United States
- Based in: New York City
- Language: English
- Website: www.opera.co.uk/features/opera-with-opera-news/
- ISSN: 0030-3607

Opera News was an American classical music magazine. It was published from 1936 to 2023 by the Metropolitan Opera Guild—a non-profit organization, located at Lincoln Center, that was founded to promote opera and support the Metropolitan Opera ("the Met") of New York City. Opera News was initially focused almost exclusively on the Met and its activities, providing information for listeners of the Saturday afternoon live Metropolitan Opera radio broadcasts.

Over the years, the magazine broadened its scope to include the larger American and international opera scenes. Published monthly, Opera News offered opera-related feature articles; artist interviews; production profiles; musicological pieces; music-business reportage; reviews of performances in the U.S. and Europe; reviews of recordings, videos, books and audio equipment; and listings of opera performances and recitals in the U.S.

The final Editor-in-Chief was F. Paul Driscoll. Regular contributors to the magazine included its former features editor, Brian Kellow, William Ashbrook, Scott Barnes, Jochen Breiholz, Fred Cohn, Erika Davidson, Justin Davidson, Peter G. Davis, Matthew Gurewitsch, Joel Honig, Tim Page, Judith Malafronte, Mark Thomas Ketterson, Martin Bernheimer, Ira Siff, Joanne Sydney Lessner, Anne Midgette, Drew Minter, William R. Braun, Phillip Kennicott, Joshua Rosenblum, Leslie Rubinstein, Alan Wagner, Steven Jude Tietjen, Adam Wasserman, Oussama Zahr, and William Zakariasen.

The magazine was also available online.

On August 15, 2023, the Metropolitan Opera announced that Opera News would be discontinued in November and incorporated into the British magazine Opera.

== History ==
Opera News (Note: The Opera News periodical was published by the John Wanamaker department stores, Wanamaker's, in the early 20th century.) was founded in 1936 by the Metropolitan Opera Guild with Mrs. John DeWitt Peltz (Mary Ellis Peltz) serving as the publication's first editor. She was hired by Eleanor Robson Belmont, who favored the "democratization of opera" and later referred to Peltz as a "gifted walking encyclopedia of opera". When the newsletter was introduced on 7 December 1936, it was a single folded broadsheet. Within a year, it was transformed into a 17-page magazine with advertising; the first magazine appeared on 15 November 1937.

Beginning in December 1940, the magazine began to focus much of its content on the weekly Metropolitan Opera radio broadcasts. At that point, Opera News offered bi-weekly issues of an expanded size during autumn, winter, and spring, but was on hiatus during summer. As time went on, the magazine began to provide more international coverage, but it still maintained its strong interest in the New York opera scene and the Met in particular. Frank Merkling succeeded Peltz to become second chief editor of Opera News. His first issue appeared on 14 October 1957. In 1972, the magazine added monthly issues in summer while keeping its bi-weekly schedule during the opera season.

In 1974, Robert Jacobson became the magazine's third chief editor. He was succeeded by Patrick O'Connor in 1988, who in turn was succeeded by Patrick J. Smith in 1989. Rudolph S. Rauch was named chief editor in 1998. Under his leadership as well as that of executive editor Brian Kellow, the magazine switched to a year-round monthly frequency starting in July 1999. F. Paul Driscoll, the final editor in chief, was appointed in July 2003.

In the June 2012 issue, the Metropolitan Opera said that Opera News would cease reviewing Met performances, following dissatisfaction among the Met leadership with the magazine's recent critiques of Robert Lepage's production of the Ring Cycle and of the company's direction under Peter Gelb. However, reactions from the public led to the decision being reversed.

In 2023, the Metropolitan Opera Guild announced that it was facing financial difficulties and had to wind down its operations. This meant ending Opera News as a stand-alone monthly publication—the last issue was volume 88, number 5, November 2023—and merging it into Opera magazine.

== Opera News Awards ==
From 2006 to 2023, the magazine annually bestowed five Opera News Awards for Distinguished Achievement.

Recipients of the awards included:

- 1st — 2006: James Conlon, Régine Crespin, Plácido Domingo, Susan Graham, Dolora Zajick
- 2nd — 2007: Ben Heppner, James Levine, René Pape, Renata Scotto, Deborah Voigt
- 3rd — 2008: Stephanie Blythe, Olga Borodina, Thomas Hampson, Leontyne Price, Julius Rudel
- 4th — 2009: John Adams (composer), Natalie Dessay, Renée Fleming, Marilyn Horne, Sherrill Milnes
- 5th — 2010: Martina Arroyo, Joyce DiDonato, Shirley Verrett, Gerald Finley, Philip Glass
- 6th — 2011: Jonas Kaufmann, Riccardo Muti, Patricia Racette, Kiri Te Kanawa, Bryn Terfel
- 7th — 2012: Karita Mattila, Anja Silja, Dmitri Hvorostovsky, Peter Mattei, Peter Sellars
- 8th — 2013: David Daniels, Simon Keenlyside, Eric Owens, Mirella Freni, Dawn Upshaw
- 9th — 2014: Patrice Chéreau, Juan Diego Flórez, Christa Ludwig, James Morris, Nina Stemme
- 10th — 2015: Piotr Beczała, Ferruccio Furlanetto, Sondra Radvanovsky, Samuel Ramey, Teresa Stratas
- 11th — 2016: Joseph Calleja, Elīna Garanča, Waltraud Meier, Anna Netrebko, José van Dam
- 12th — 2017: Robert Carsen, Christine Goerke, Yannick Nézet-Séguin, Matthew Polenzani, Frederica von Stade
- 13th — 2018: William Christie, Fiorenza Cossotto, Vittorio Grigolo, Hei-Kyung Hong, Sonya Yoncheva
- 14th — 2019: Ramón Vargas, Ailyn Pérez, Luca Pisaroni, Laurent Pelly, Rosalind Elias
- 15th — 2020: Thomas Allen, Javier Camarena, Anthony Roth Costanzo, Diana Damrau, Ana María Martínez
- 16th — 2021: Lawrence Brownlee, Janet Baker, Cecilia Bartoli
- 17th — 2022: Denyce Graves, Quinn Kelsey, Elza van den Heever
- 18th — 2023: Lise Davidsen, Erin Morley, George Shirley

== Notes and references ==
Notes
