= Grant Park Symphony Orchestra =

Orchestra in Chicago

- Symphony orchestra
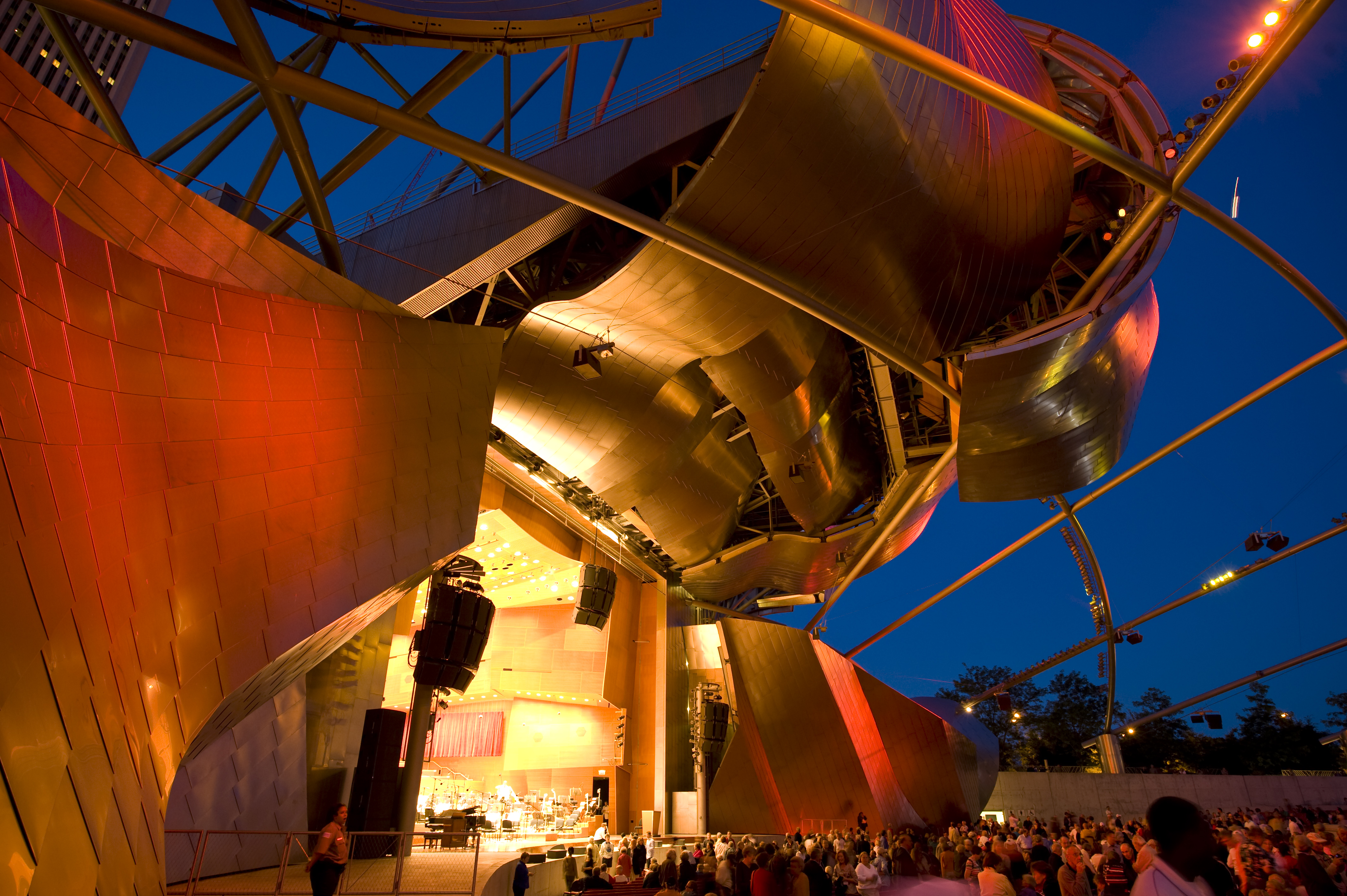
- Grant Park Music Festival at the Pritzker Pavilion
- Short name: Grant Park Orchestra
- Founded: 1944
- Location: Chicago, Illinois
- Principal conductor: Giancarlo Guerrero
- Website: Official website

The Grant Park Symphony Orchestra or simply the Grant Park Orchestra is a publicly sponsored symphony orchestra that provides free performances in the Grant Park Music Festival during the summer months in Millennium Park in Chicago, Illinois. Its sister organization is the Grant Park Chorus; the orchestra and chorus hold both joint appearances and separate performances.

== History ==
The orchestra was founded in 1944 and the chorus in 1962. In 1944, the orchestra was formed under the direction of Walter L. Larsen and Chicago Symphony Orchestra manager George Kuyper. Rudolph Ganz conducted the first concerts. In 1978, when the Petrillo Music Shell was relocated, the orchestra became part of a tradition of Independence Day Eve concerts accompanied by fireworks and attended by well over 100,000 spectators. Their rendition of Pyotr Tchaikovsky's 1812 Overture marked the culmination of the event and was choreographed to be synchronous with howitzer blasts and a crescendo of fireworks. Chicago Mayor Jane Byrne wanted to put an end to the large Independence Day Eve concert in order to reduce costs and differentiate herself from her predecessors, but was convinced not to by Grant Park Music Festival concert manager Steven Ovitsky. One year, Byrne celebrated the event with Muhammad Ali at her side.

In 2000, the festival reached an agreement with Cedille Records to record the Grant Park Orchestra. It produced six CDs during the decade:

- American Works for Organ and Orchestra (with organist David Schrader), released June 18, 2002
- Robert Kurka: Symphony No. 2; Julius Caesar; Music for Orchestra; Serenade for Small Orchestra (Grammy Award-nominated), released January 1, 2004
- Portraits (with violinist Jennifer Koh), released May 30, 2006
- American Orchestral Works, released June 27, 2006
- Royal Mezzo (with mezzo-soprano Jennifer Larmore), released June 10, 2008
- Symphony in Waves: Music Of Aaron Jay Kernis, released August 12, 2008

At the end of the Grant Park Music Festival season in August, the orchestra and Carlos Kalmar presented Pulitzer Prize-winning composer John Adams' On the Transmigration of Souls, which was written at the request of the New York Philharmonic to honor the victims of the September 11 attacks. Adams won the Pulitzer Prize in 2003 for that particular work.
