= Metropolitan Opera Guild =

The Metropolitan Opera Guild was established in 1935 to broaden the base of support for the Metropolitan Opera, promote greater interest in opera, and develop future audiences by reaching out to a wide public and serving as an educational resource that provides programs, publications, materials and services to schools, families, individuals, and community groups nationwide.

The Guild was the brainchild of Eleanor Robson Belmont, a retired actress and the first female member of the board of directors of the Metropolitan Opera. She believed opera truly belongs to the people, and wished to provide them with more ways to connect to and enjoy the art form. In its first 75 years, the Guild contributed more than $245 million to the Met (figure adjusted for inflation). The Guild provides programs and services in many areas designed to further these goals.

In August 2023, it was announced that due to financial struggles, the guild would be winding down its operations, and stop publishing Opera News as a stand-alone monthly magazine. The Met has stated that they intend to take over some of the guild's responsibilities and promise to transfer or provide severance to the effected employees.

== Guild Activities ==
The Guild pursues its mission through a variety of educational outreach programs, publishing Opera News magazine and presenting special events season.

Opera News, the monthly magazine published by the Guild, reports on opera around the world. Each issue includes reviews of commercial recordings and live performances, profiles of artists, and articles by eminent writers on the music scene. During the Saturday afternoon Met broadcast season, the magazine also includes an in-depth guide to both radio and HD broadcasts. With a circulation of over 100,000, it is the world's largest-circulation magazine devoted to opera.

The Guild also produces an annual series of public programs at major New York City venues; these include the Annual Guild Luncheon and the Opera News Awards.

=== Guild History ===
In the seasons leading up to the creation of the Met Opera Guild in 1935, the financial situation at the Met Opera was dire. The Great Depression extinguished the social structure that gave rise to the old Met Opera, a place dominated by the whims of a few rich boxholders. The real admirers of the art form were revealed in box office receipts; while “the cheap seats were often filled … (the pricey orchestra sections featured) stretches of empty seats."

Belmont's financial idea was simple: instead of supporting the opera with a million dollars from one wealthy patron, support the opera with one dollar from a million people. In her memoirs, The Fabric of Memory, Belmont recalled,

"We felt it important to broaden the base of responsibility for the future; to share in some measure privileges that had hitherto belonged to a small group of directors and stockholders. … I presented … a plan for a membership organization with specified privileges and services, in exchange for dues scaled from $10 to $100. It was agreed that a portion of each membership would go toward maintaining the opera … Democratization of opera had begun!"

In this way, Belmont helped pioneer the multi-source private funding model used by performing arts organizations and many other cultural institutions to this day. In its first year the Guild signed up 2,000 members and contributed $5,000 to the Met Opera for the purchase of a new cyclorama.

Starting in 1936 the Guild began publishing Opera News magazine, initiated the backstage tours program and a lecture series. Guild student matinees began the following year. Due to financial woes of the 1970s that cut arts teachers from schools, the Guild began its teacher training and in-school artists residencies.

With European artists isolated in Europe by the political upheaval during World War II and the appreciable growth of American music conservatories during the latter half of the 19th century, American singers came into their own in the early 20th century, jump-starting the American operatic growth that continued after the war. The Met Opera Guild supported the cultivation of American opera singers (thus encouraging other opera guilds to do the same). In the 1950s, Eleanor Belmont was responsible for the National Council Auditions, which take place across the 50 states discovering new talent and funneling them to the Met Opera's stage or its Young Artist Program for further training.

=== School Partnerships ===
School Partnerships include the Access Opera program, Urban Voices choruses, vocal mentorships and professional development for teachers.

== Guild Membership ==
Guild membership encompasses seven tiers of giving levels, with benefits including Opera News subscription, priority purchase period, discounts and access to the Belmont Room in the Metropolitan Opera House. Guild membership fees go to support the activities of The Metropolitan Opera, and ranges between $5–6 million in recent years.
