= Copeland (surname) =

Copeland is a surname. Notable people with the surname include:

- Adam Copeland (born 1973), Canadian professional wrestler
- Al Copeland (1944–2008), American restaurateur
- Alan Copeland (1926–2022), American singer-songwriter
- Anthony Copeland (born 1963), American football player
- Arthur Herbert Copeland (1898–1970), American mathematician
- Billy Copeland (1856–1917), Scottish cricketer
- Brad Copeland (born 1975), American television writer
- Brian Copeland (born 1964), American comedian
- Bubba Copeland (1974–2023), American politician and pastor
- Chad Copeland (born 1971), American basketball player
- Charles L. Copeland (born 1963), American politician
- Charlie Copeland (footballer), (1892–1939), English footballer
- Chris Copeland (born 1984), American basketball player
- Dale Copeland (born 1943), New Zealand artist
- David Copeland (disambiguation), multiple people
- Devin Copeland (stage name Devin the Dude, born 1969), American rapper
- Donald Copeland (born 1984), American basketball player
- Donnie Copeland (born 1961), American pastor and politician
- Edmund Copeland, British cosmologist
- Edward Copeland (disambiguation), multiple people
- Edwin Copeland (1873–1964), American botanist
- Elizabeth Copeland (ring name Beth Phoenix, born 1980), American wrestler
- Eric Copeland (born 1978), American musician
- George Copeland (1882–1971), American pianist
- Gordon Copeland (1943–2018), New Zealand politician
- Herbert Copeland (biologist) (1902–1968), American biologist
- Herbert Copeland (murderer) (1875–1925), American murderer and self-confessed serial killer
- Hollis Copeland (born 1955), American basketball player
- Horace Copeland (born 1971), American football player
- Howard Copeland (1944–2019), American lawyer and politician
- Ian Copeland (1949–2006), American talent agent
- Ida Copeland (1876–1964), British politician
- Isaac Copeland (born 1995), American basketball player
- Ivy Copeland (1888–1961), New Zealand artist and art teacher
- J. William Copeland (1914–1988), associate justice of the North Carolina Supreme Court
- Jack Copeland (born 1950), British philosopher
- Jacob Copeland (born 1999), American football player
- James Copeland (disambiguation), multiple people
- Jeremaine Copeland (born 1977), Canadian football player
- Jim Copeland (American football) (1945–2010), American football player
- Joan Copeland (1922–2022), American actress
- John Copeland (born 1970), American football player
- John Anthony Copeland Jr. (1834–1859), American abolitionist
- Johnny Copeland (1937–1997), American blues singer and guitarist
- Joseph T. Copeland (1813–1893), associate justice of the Michigan Supreme Court
- Katayoun Copeland, American lawyer and politician
- Katherine Copeland (born 1990), British rower
- Kenneth Copeland (born 1936), American televangelist
- Kyle Copeland (born 1961), American tennis player
- Lammot du Pont Copeland (1905–1983), American businessman
- Lanard Copeland (born 1965), Australian-American basketball player and coach
- Lennie Copeland (1881–1951), American mathematician and professor at Wellesley College
- Les C. Copeland (1887–1942), American composer and pianist
- Leslie Joshua Copeland (born 1946), Australian agricultural chemist
- Lillian Copeland (1904–1964), American Olympic discus champion; set world records in discus, javelin, and shot put
- Lorraine Copeland (1921–2013), British archaeologist
- Martha Copeland (c. 1891-1894–unknown), American classic female blues singer
- Marquise Copeland (born 1997), American football player
- Maurice Copeland (1911–1985), American actor
- Miles Copeland (disambiguation), multiple people
- Misty Copeland (born 1982), American ballet dancer
- Oren S. Copeland (1887–1958), American politician
- Paul Copeland (born 1940), Canadian human rights lawyer
- Peter Copeland (1942–2006), British sound archivist
- Quadir Copeland (born 2003), American basketball player
- Ray and Faye Copeland (1914–1993 and 1921–2003), American serial killers
- Robert Copeland (disambiguation), multiple people
- Robin Copeland (born 1987), Irish rugby player
- Royal Copeland (Canadian football) (1924–2011), Canadian football player
- Royal S. Copeland (1868–1938), American senator
- Russell Copeland (born 1971), American football player
- Scott Copeland (born 1987), American baseball player
- Sebastian Copeland (born 1964), American photographer
- Shemekia Copeland (born 1979), American blues singer
- Silas L. Copeland (1920–2001), American soldier
- Stacey Copeland (born 1981), British boxer
- Stewart Copeland (born 1952), American musician
- Stuart Copeland (born 1968), Australian politician
- Ted Copeland (born 1940), English football coach
- Thomas Copeland (1781–1855), British surgeon
- Thomas Copeland (schoolmaster) (1437–??), English schoolmaster
- Timothy Copeland, American politician
- Tom Copeland (1924–2025), American politician
- Trent Copeland (born 1986), Australian cricketer
- Tysen-Otis Copeland (born 1997), Canadian football player
- Vincent Copeland (1915–1993), American labor activist
- William Copeland (disambiguation), multiple people

== Fictional characters ==
- Dominic Copeland, a fictional character in the British medical drama Holby City
- Joseph Copeland, a fictional character in the anime Gundam SEED DESTINY
- Kevin and Marcus Copeland, fictional characters in the 2004 film White Chicks
- Nathan Copeland, an assassin and rap artist in the video game No More Heroes 2: Desperate Struggle
- Mark Copeland, a recurring fictional character in the video game Days Gone
- Saige Copeland, American Girl character, "Girl of the Year" for 2013

== See also ==
- William Copeland Borlase
- Copeland (disambiguation)
- Copland (disambiguation)
