= Grant Park Music Festival =

Classical music concert series in Chicago, Illinois

- Genre: Classical music festival
- Dates: Wednesday, Saturday, Sunday, June–August
- Locations: Jay Pritzker Pavilion, 201 E. Randolph Street; Millennium Park, Chicago, IL, US (July 16, 2004–present) Petrillo Music Shell; 235 S. Columbus Drive; Grant Park, Chicago, IL, US (1978–2004) Petrillo Music Shell; Grant Park, Chicago, IL, US (1935–1977)
- Years active: July 1, 1935–present
- Website: www.grantparkmusicfestival.com

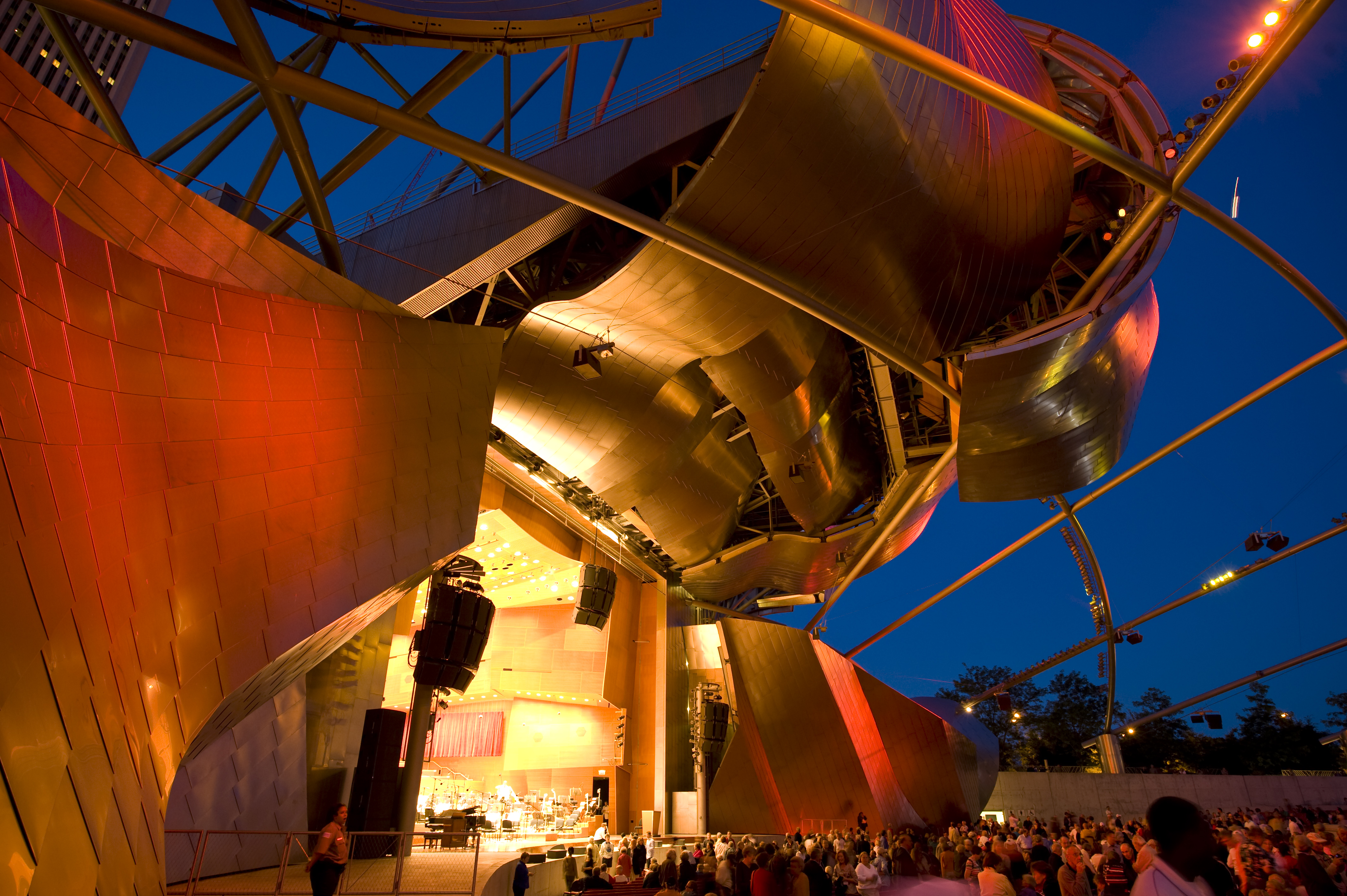
Night view of Frank Gehry's Pritzker Pavilion, July 5, 2008

The Grant Park Music Festival (formerly the Grant Park Concerts) is a ten-week classical music concert series held annually in Chicago, Illinois, United States. It features the Grant Park Symphony Orchestra and Grant Park Chorus along with guest performers and conductors, and is one of the only free outdoor classical-music concert series in the US.

The Festival is a non-profit organization. Live performances have been a Chicago tradition since 1931, when mayor Anton Cermak suggested free concerts to lift spirits of Chicagoans during the Great Depression. The tradition of symphonic Grant Park Music Festival concerts began in 1935.

The Festival was previously held at the Petrillo Music Shell in Grant Park, but moved to the Jay Pritzker Pavilion in the Millennium Park section of Grant Park for its 70th season, in 2004. Concerts are occasionally held at the Harris Theater. Over time, the Festival has had various financial supporters, three primary locations, and one name change. During its ten-week season, the Festival features a weekly live broadcast series on WFMT, and has consistently engaged many of the world's leading classical musicians. The Festival boasts a number of commercially released recordings including one Emmy nominated release.

== Funding ==
The series was almost completely funded by the Park District, originally. The District was responsible for performer payrolls, concert advertising and marketing, administered orchestra auditions, and coordinated the scheduling for each season list of guest artists. Advertising costs for printed media designed by Park District graphic designers were funded through the Works Progress Administration (WPA) and the Federal Arts Program. The tradition of posters for Chicago Transit Authority buses, Chicago "L" trains and stations and field houses continued even after WPA relief funding ended.

In 1977, the Grant Park Concerts Society evolved to coordinate all fund-raising for the Festival. It coordinated both general marketing and the membership program. By hosting fund-raising events and selling Festival memberships, it supplemented the Park District funding, which was in the $1.5–2.0 million range. In 1996, the Park District and Festival staff discontinued their relationship with the Concerts Society. The Park District resumed its responsibility as the sole marketing and fund-raising department.

At the end of the 1990s, the Festival was recognized as a non-profit organization and developed ties with the Chicago Department of Cultural Affairs. The relationship had the city department taking charge of some administrative duties. As of 2009, The Festival featuring the Grammy-nominated Grant Park Orchestra and award-winning Chorus is sponsored by the Chicago Park District, the Chicago Department of Cultural Affairs and the Grant Park Orchestral Association. The Festival's 2024 operating budget is $8.7 million. The park district provides approximately 35% of the operating costs, while the Department of Cultural Affairs contributes in-kind support. The remaining funding come from a variety of private sources including foundations, corporations and thousands of individual patrons.

== History ==
Music Festival Host Venues

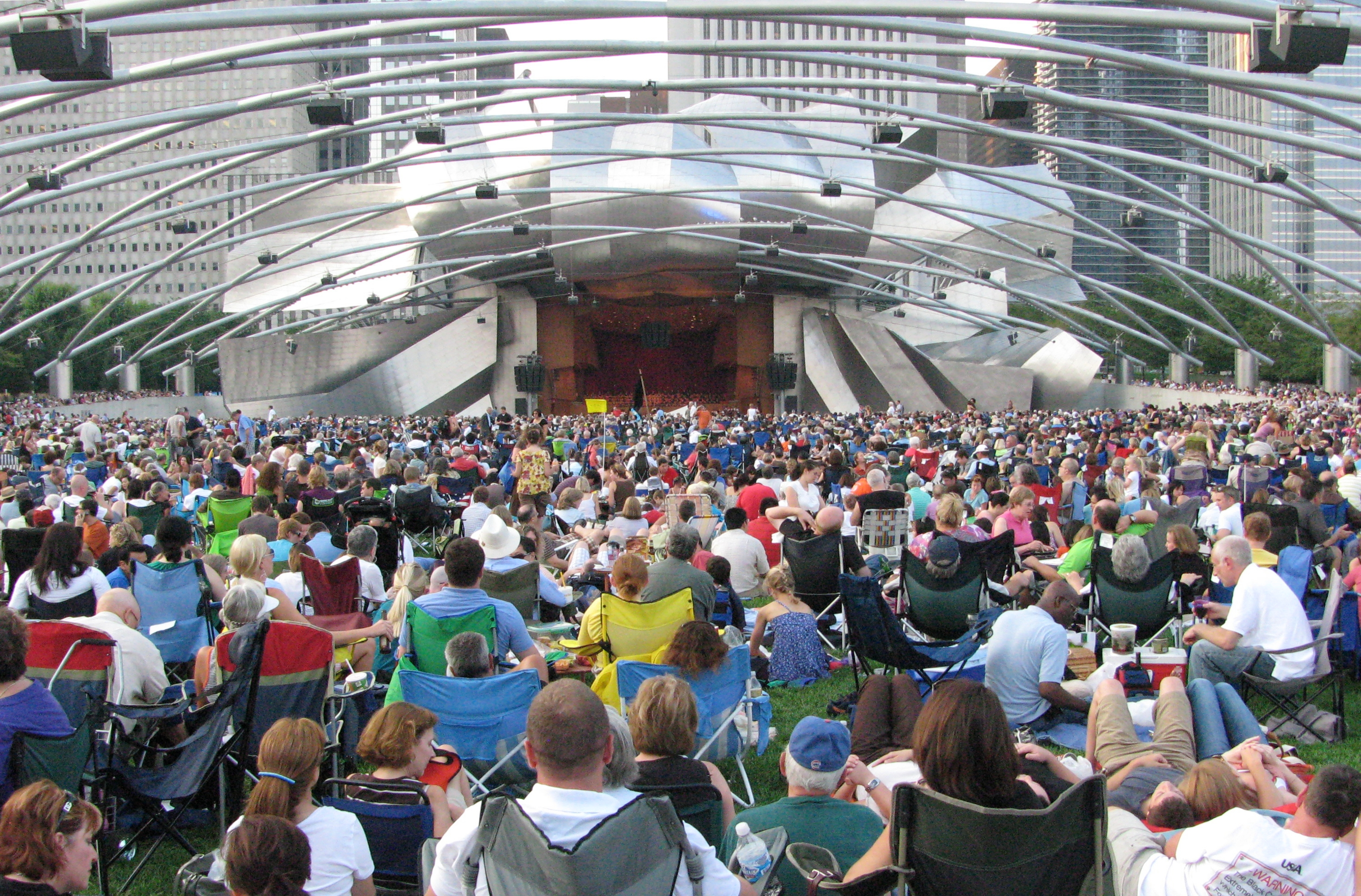
Jay Pritzker Pavilion Great Lawn on the August 14, 2009 final weekend Beethoven's 9th Symphony Festival performance

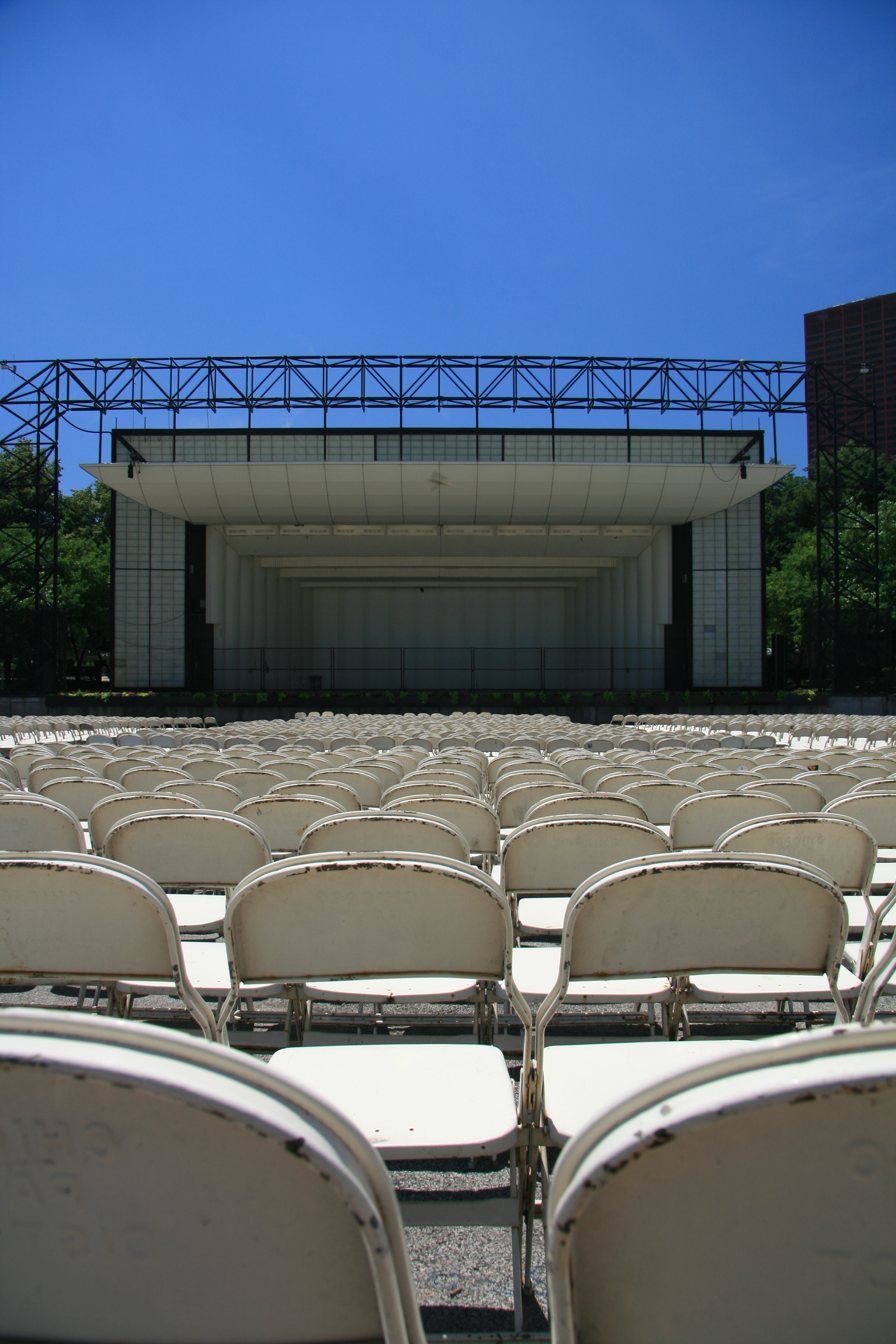
The Petrillo Music Shell hosted the Music Festival until 2004

The first concert occurred after the completion of the original Petrillo Music Shell on July 1, 1935 with a march from Richard Wagner's Tannhäuser. In the past, National Broadcasting Company (NBC) and CBS Broadcasting Inc. (CBS) have broadcast the free concerts. The first summer boasted an attendance of approximately 1.9 million for 65 concerts. In 1939, the single-concert attendance record was set with over 300,000 for the Lily Pons concert. Pons shared the stage with her husband Andre Kostelanetz in what was described as the largest audience of her career. David Rubinoff was estimated to have drawn as many as 225,000. Current attendance at the approximately thirty annual concerts is estimated at three hundred thousand in total. The free Festival has always had a picnic-like atmosphere. In the 1930s, the concerts were presented on national radio broadcasts to dozens of radio stations.

In addition to lifting spirits, the Grant Park Music Festival has been able to provide musicians a living wage. In 1938, when the minimum wage was $0.25/hour, the musicians were paid $10 ($228.72 today) for a 2-hour concert. In the early years, through the 1940s the Chicago Woman's Symphony performed often at the Festival. In 1944, the Festival developed its own professional Grant Park Symphony Orchestra. Also in 1944, WGN (AM) began the nationally syndicated Theater of the Air live from Grant Park. In 1945, Nikolai Malko became the Festival's first resident conductor. He served in that role until 1954.

Between the scheduling of Van Cliburn's 1958 Grant Park Music Festival appearance and his actual July 16 appearance, he won the quadrennial International Tchaikovsky Competition in Moscow that April. He was catapulted to international fame for winning one of the world's elite music competitions. As a result, he was greeted with a celebration that included a ticker tape parade down Michigan Avenue and his Grant Park Music Festival appearance was a major event.

In the 1960s, the Festival took a more adventurous direction featuring works by the likes of Arnold Schoenberg, Sergei Prokofiev, Gustav Mahler and Anton Webern. Thomas Peck led the newly formed Grant Park Chorus, which he directed until his death in 1994. In 1963, the Festival introduced the interactive daytime Young People's Concerts led by Irwin Hoffman and at times by youth audience members. Gordon also introduced opera in concert as part of the Festival in 1964.

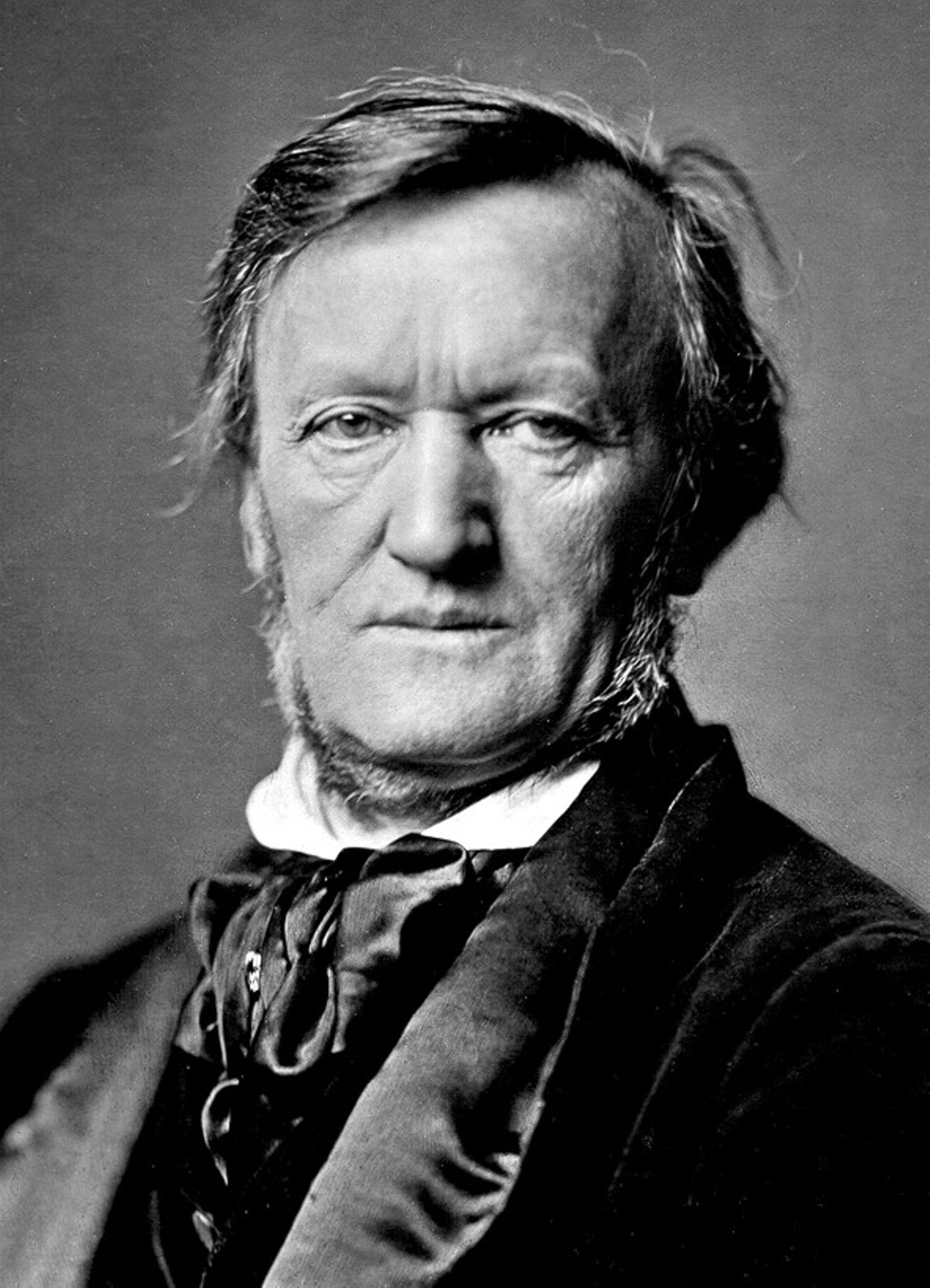
Richard Wagner's Tannhäuser was performed at the first Music Festival on July 1, 1935.

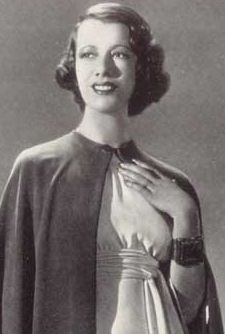
The 1939 Lily Pons concert attracted over 300,000 attendees, a number which has only been rivaled by Van Cliburn.

The 1970s saw declining attendance at the Festival. Mitch Miller, who derived popularity from the Sing Along with Mitch television show was a regular conductor and one of the largest draws. Steven Ovitsky, became concert manager in 1979 and served until 1990. During the 1980s the Festival earned a reputation for performing works by American musical composers. Ovitsky focused on living American composers such as William Bolcom, John Adams, Michael Torke and Paul Freeman. The 1980s also saw a host of elite principal conductors such as Zdeněk Mácal, Leonard Slatkin, Hugh Wolff, David Zinman and Robert Shaw.

The 1990s saw wide-ranging performances such as the Russian opera Prince Igor, a narration of Casey at the Bat by Jack Brickhouse with orchestral accompaniment, six Chicago Bulls National Basketball Association championship celebrations and a celebrated return visit of Van Cliburn for the sixtieth season. The Van Cliburn visit rivaled the Pons attendance figures with estimates exceeding 300,000. In 1992, the Grant Park Concerts officially became the Grant Park Music Festival. From 1994 to 1997, Hugh Wolff served as principal conductor of the Festival and it took until 2000 for an elaborate search to yield Kalmar as his successor.

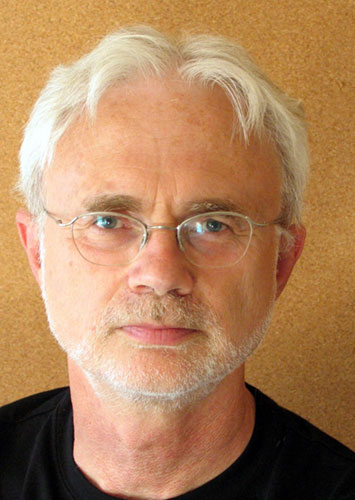
The Festival ended the 2005 season with John Adams' Pulitzer Prize-winning On the Transmigration of Souls.

In 2000, the Festival reached an agreement with Cedille Records to record the Grant Park Orchestra. It produced six CDs during the decade. In 2001, Boston Landmarks Orchestra was founded for the purpose of providing a free summer concert series in Boston's Hatch Memorial Shell and now claims to also provide an annual free summer music series. On July 16, 2004, the Festival moved to the state of the art Pritzker Pavilion, where it shares space with a regular world music series ("Music Without Borders"), a jazz series ("Made in Chicago") and a variety of annual performances by Steppenwolf Theatre, Lyric Opera of Chicago and Chicago Symphony Orchestra. Nonetheless, the Festival remains the core of the summer program with its Wednesday, Friday and Saturday evening performances for ten weeks during the heart of the summer. At the end of the 2005 Grant Park Music Festival season in August, the Festival's Grant Park Orchestra and Carlos Kalmar presented Pulitzer Prize-winning composer Adams' On the Transmigration of Souls, which was written at the request of the New York Philharmonic to honor the victims of the September 11 attacks. In 2006, the Joffrey Ballet celebrated its fiftieth anniversary in a collaboration with the Festival. During the decade, the Festival hosted an innovative array of talents such as Chinese erhu player Betti Xiang, pipa player Yang Wei, Portuguese fado singer Mariza, Cuban classical and jazz clarinetist Paquito D'Rivera, Hungarian-Roma fiddler Roby Lakatos and Mediterranean singer Maria del Mar Bonet.

The festival went into hiatus in 2020 resulting from COVID-19 pandemic. It resumed the next year.

== Performances ==
The performance schedule includes ten consecutive weeks of performances on Wednesday, Friday and Saturday from mid June to mid August. Currently, performances usually begin at 6:30 on Wednesday and Friday and 7:30 on Saturday. Seats are available for purchase in the front half of the seating bowl, while seats in the back half and on the Lawn are free and available on a first-come, first serve basis. Harris Theater hosts occasional Grant Park Music Festival events. The orchestra and chorus have open rehearsals at the Pritzker Pavilion during performance season with sessions usually running from 11:00 am to 1:30 pm and approximately 2:30 or 3:00 pm until 5:00 pm. The Festival is represented by a staff of trained guides, called docents, that field questions and provide educational talks during the rehearsals. The rehearsals have programs available.

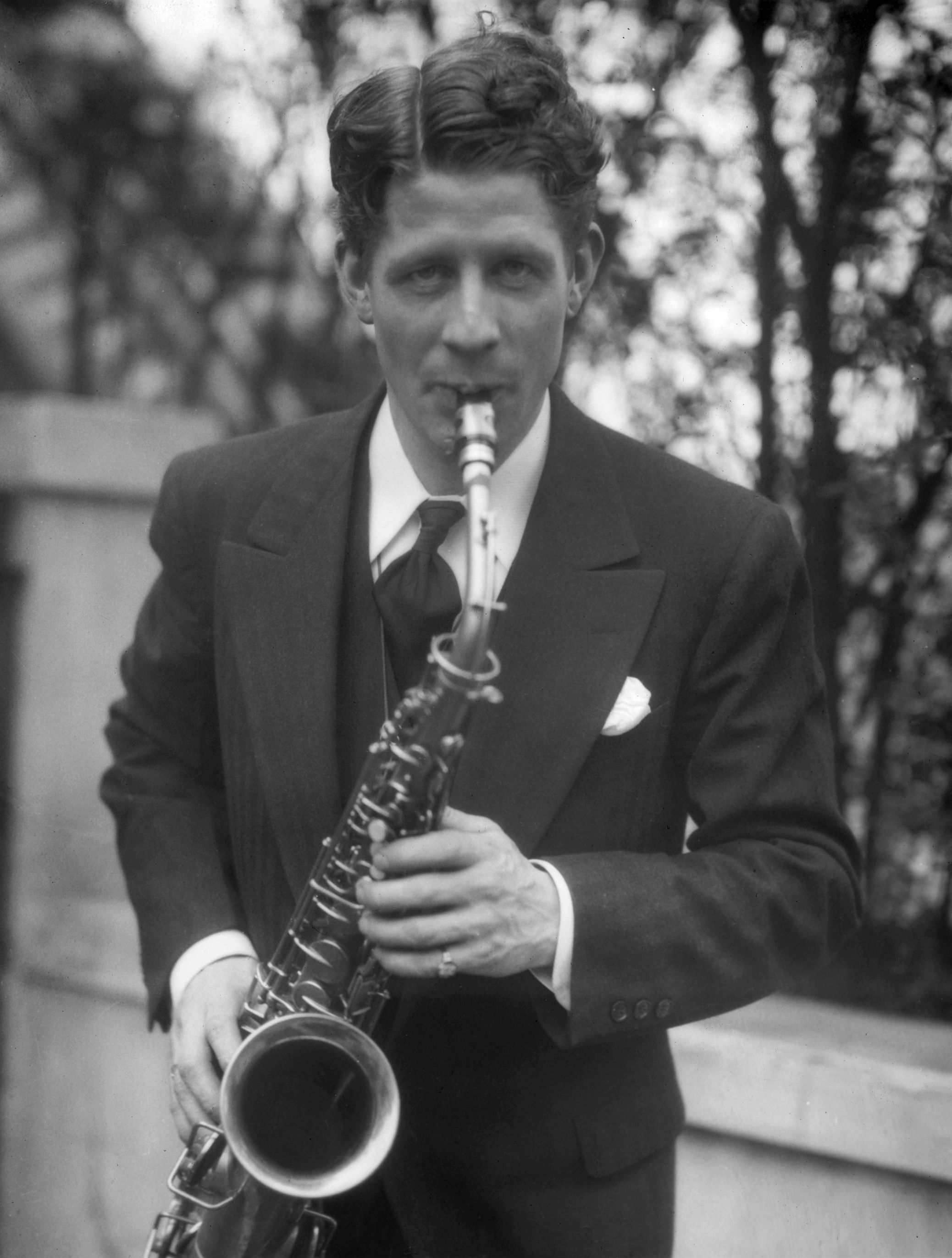
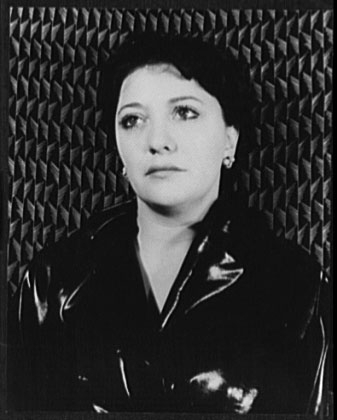
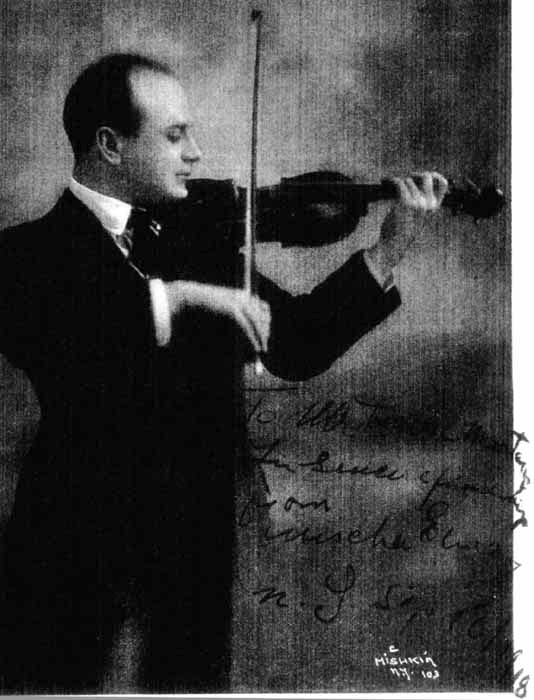
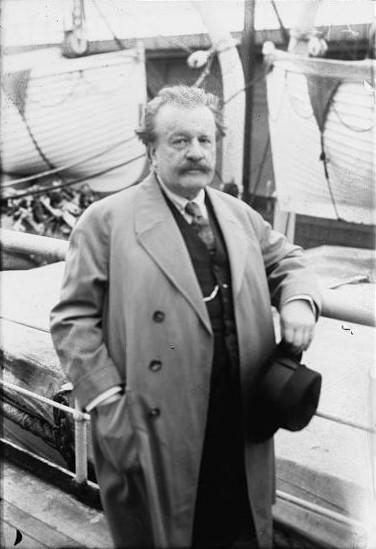
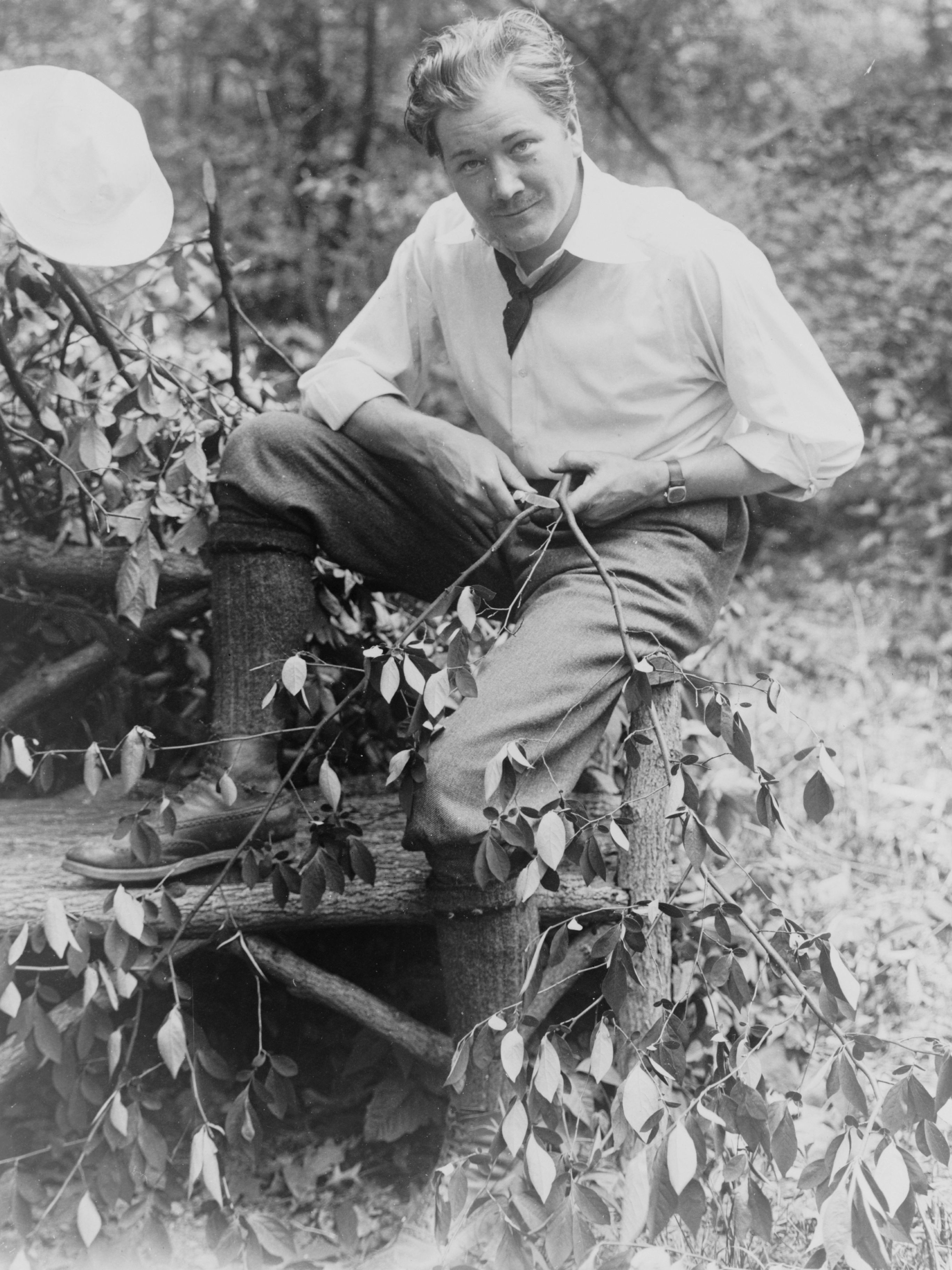
1930s performers included (left to right) Rudy Vallee, Helen Morgan, Mischa Elman, Moriz Rosenthal and John Charles Thomas

In the 1930s, the concerts lured some of the most prominent performers and conductors in the world: Pons, Jascha Heifetz, Bobby Breen, Rudy Vallee, Helen Morgan, conductor Andre Kostelanetz, violinists David Rubinoff, Mischa Elman, Efrem Zimbalist and Albert Spalding, pianist Moriz Rosenthal, sopranos Marion Claire, Edith Mason and Vivian Della Chiesa, tenors Tito Schipa, John Carter, Lawrence Tibbett and baritone John Charles Thomas.

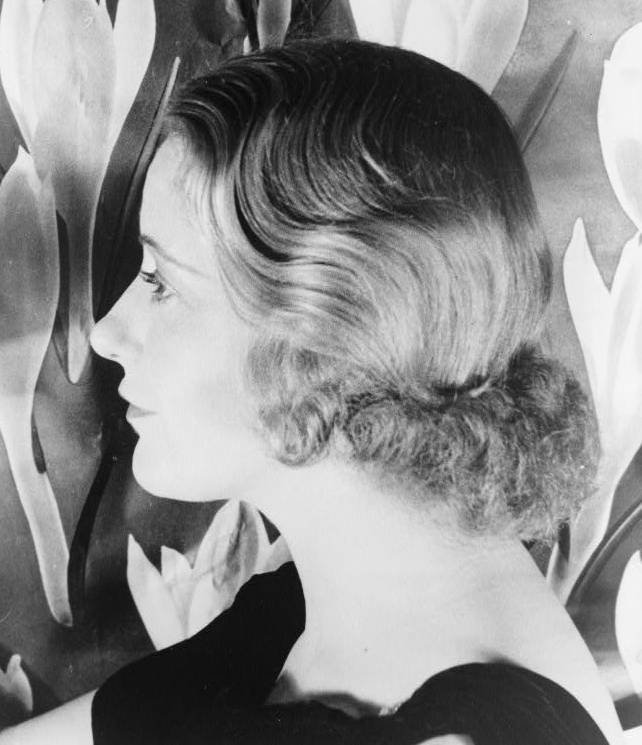
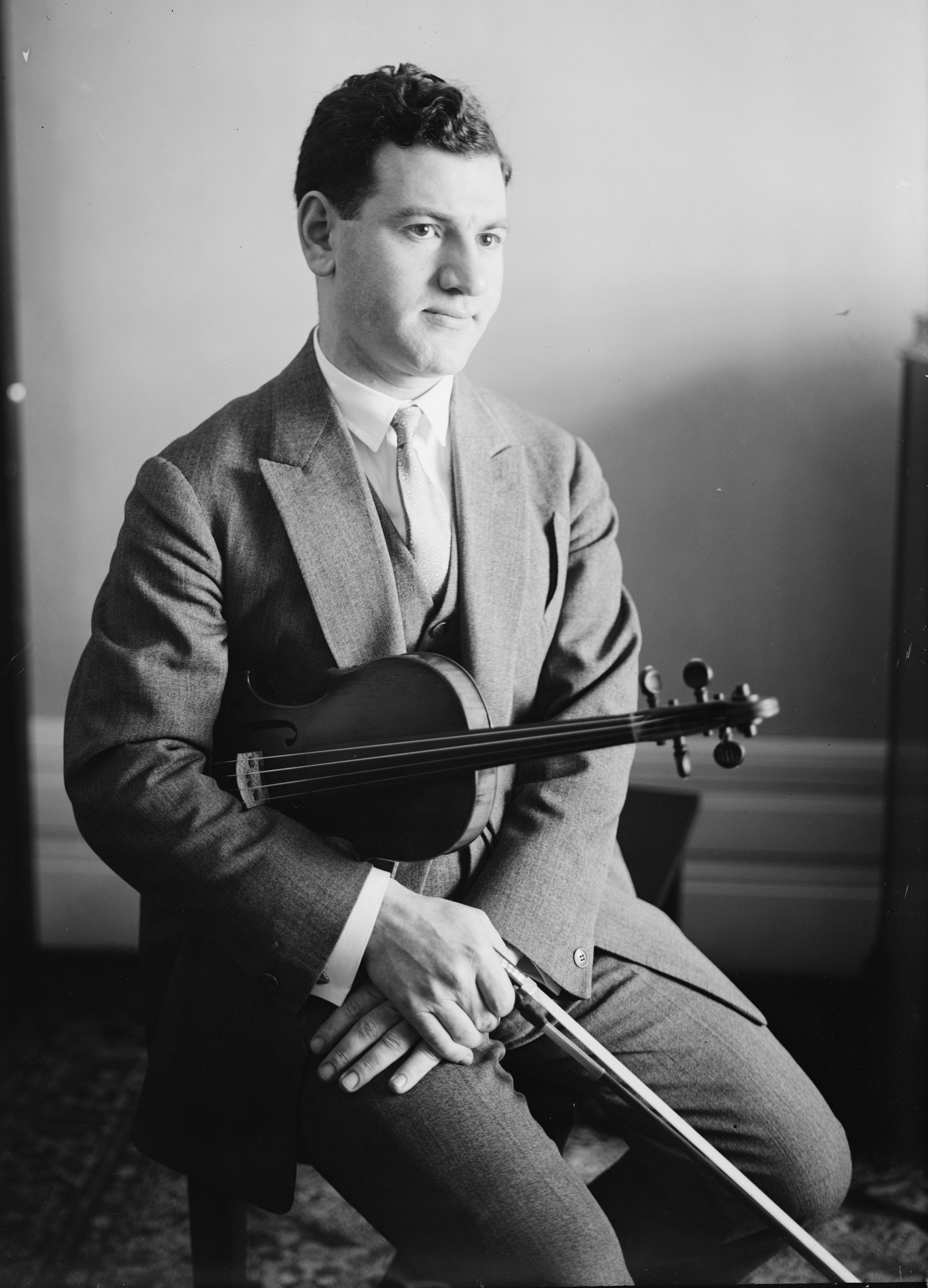
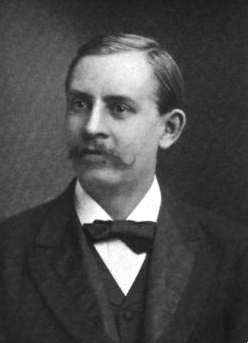
1940s performers included (left to right) Mario Lanza, Paul Robeson, Grace Moore, Mischa Mischakoff and Frederick Stock

The 1940s saw a broad spectrum of performers including Mario Lanza, clarinetist Benny Goodman, soprano Kirsten Flagstad and actor-singer Paul Robeson. Other performers included sopranos Claire, Eileen Farrell, Grace Moore and Della Chiesa, tenors Giovanni Martinelli, Richard Tucker and Jan Peerce, baritone Robert Merrill, violinist Mischa Mischakoff and conductors Frederick Stock, Leo Kopp, Arthur Fiedler and Antal Doráti.

Beginning in the 1950s, Chicago Mayor Richard J. Daley greeted the opening night crowds nearly every year during his 21-year tenure. Among the performers of the 1950s were sopranos Beverly Sills and Farrell, tenor Peerce, pianists, Van Cliburn, Jorge Bolet, Gary Graffman and Earl Wild, violinists Elman and Michael Rabin, and cellist Janos Starker.

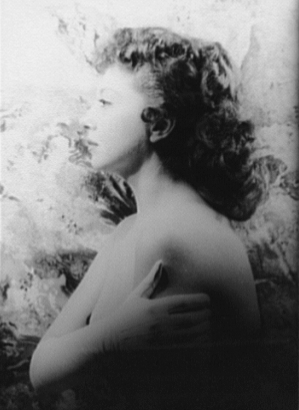
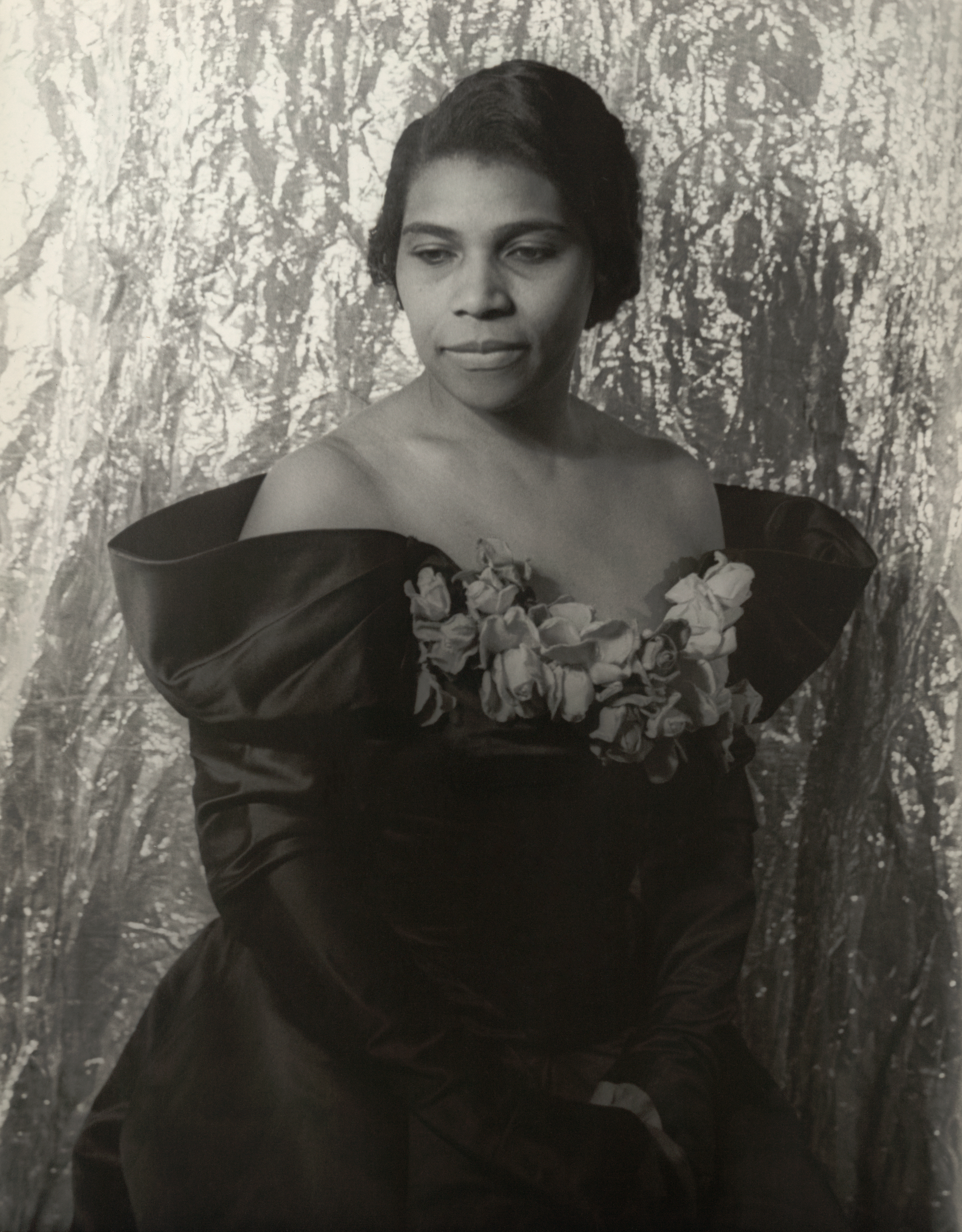
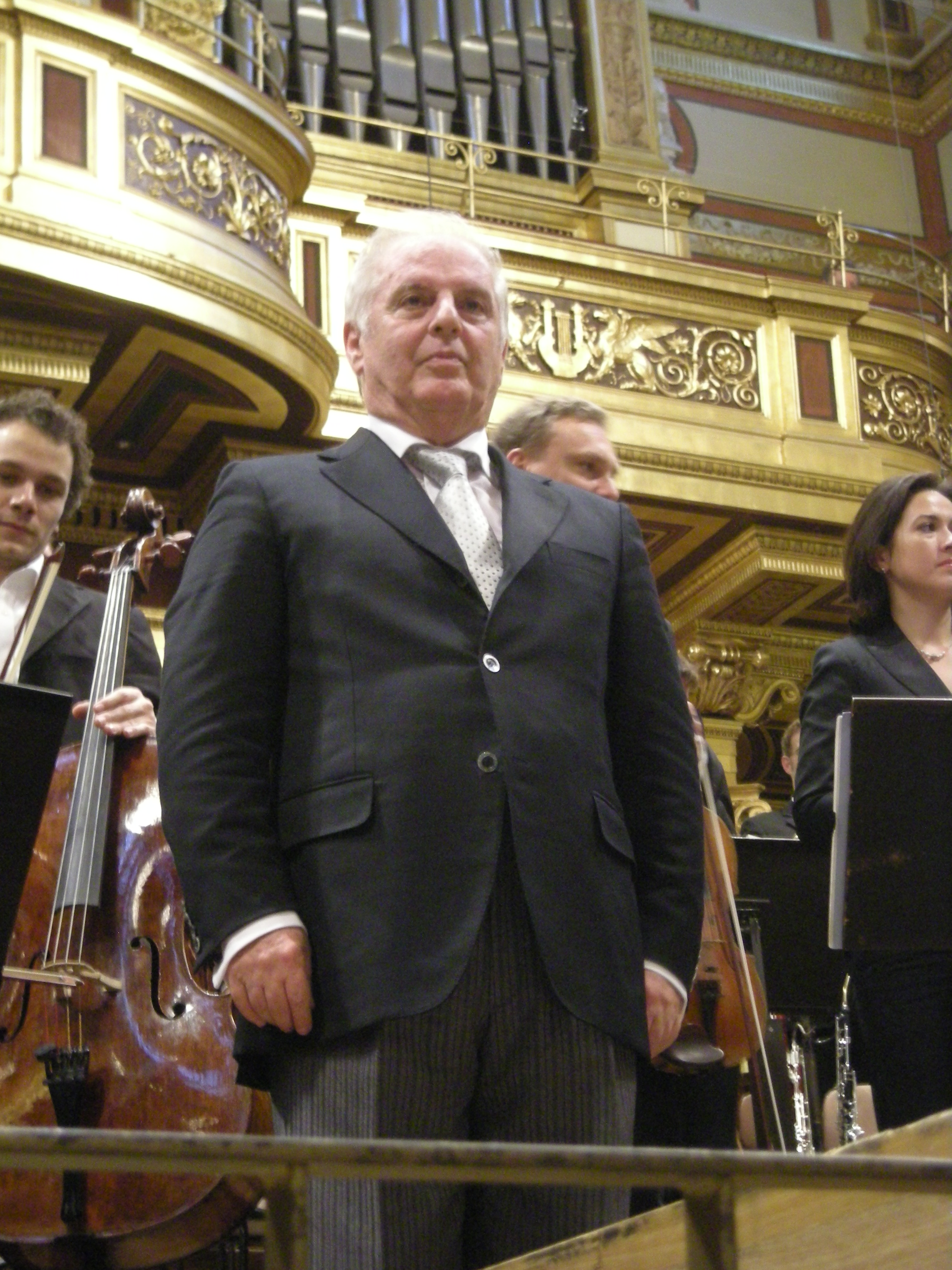
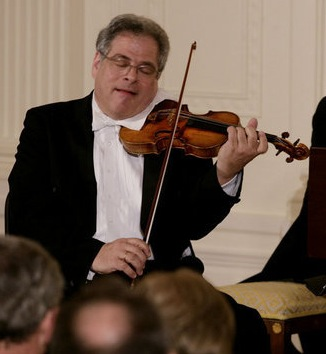
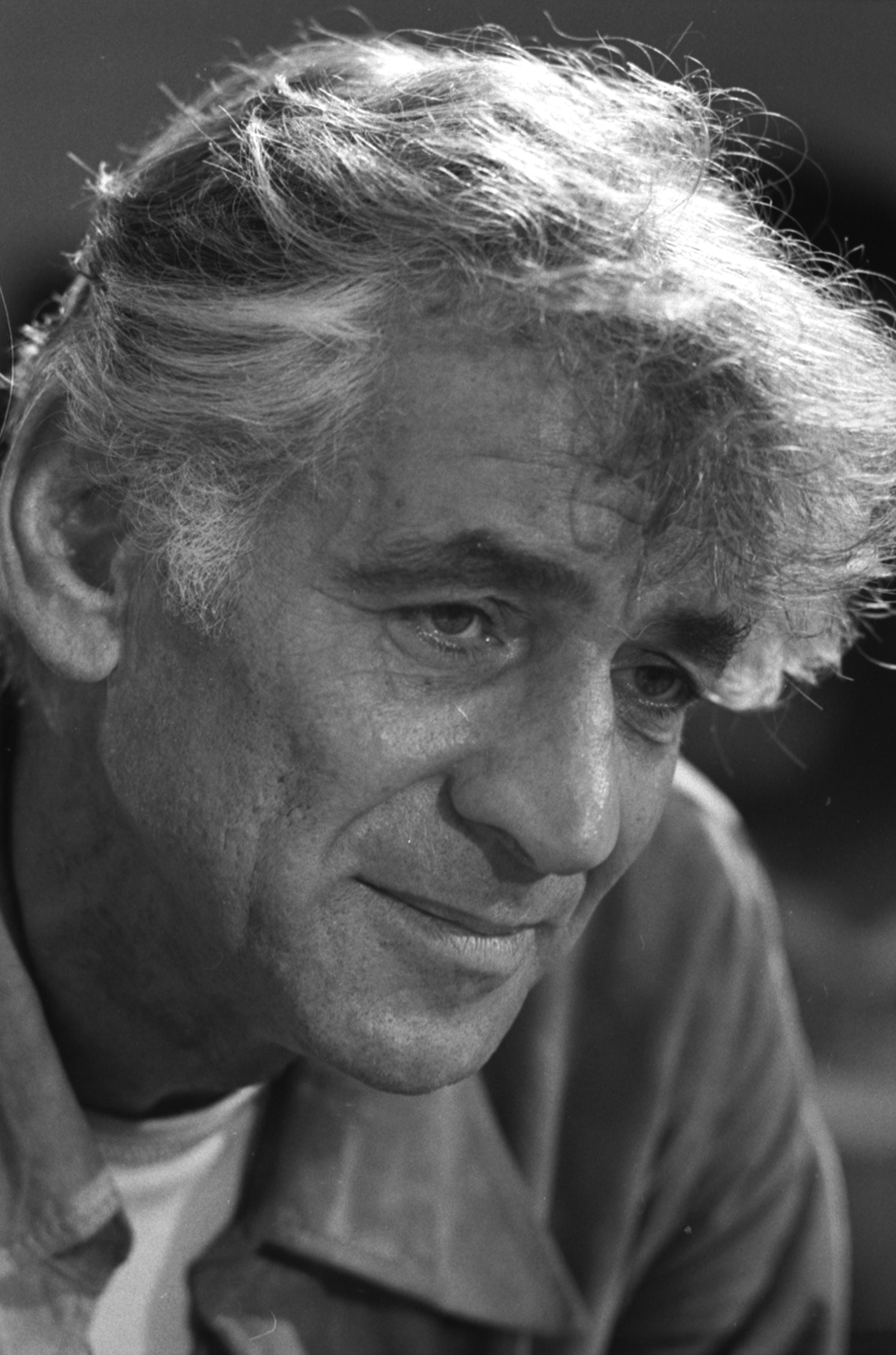
1950s and 1960s performers included (left to right) Beverly Sills, Marian Anderson, Daniel Barenboim, Itzhak Perlman and Leonard Bernstein

The 1960s upheld the tradition of diverse audiences and performers such as contralto Marian Anderson, pianists Alfred Brendel, Daniel Barenboim, Leon Fleisher, Lorin Hollander and Christoph Eschenbach, violinists Itzhak Perlman, Ruggiero Ricci, Charles Treger, Jaime Laredo, cellist Leonard Rose, conductor Leonard Bernstein, tenor Plácido Domingo, mezzo-sopranos Maryilyn Horne and Tatiana Troyanos, soprano Martina Arroyo and Roberta Peters, as well as a host of dance companies such as the American Ballet Theatre, Joffrey Ballet and Maria Alba Spanish Dance Company. The Joffrey Ballet performed Gerald Arpino and George Balanchine works.

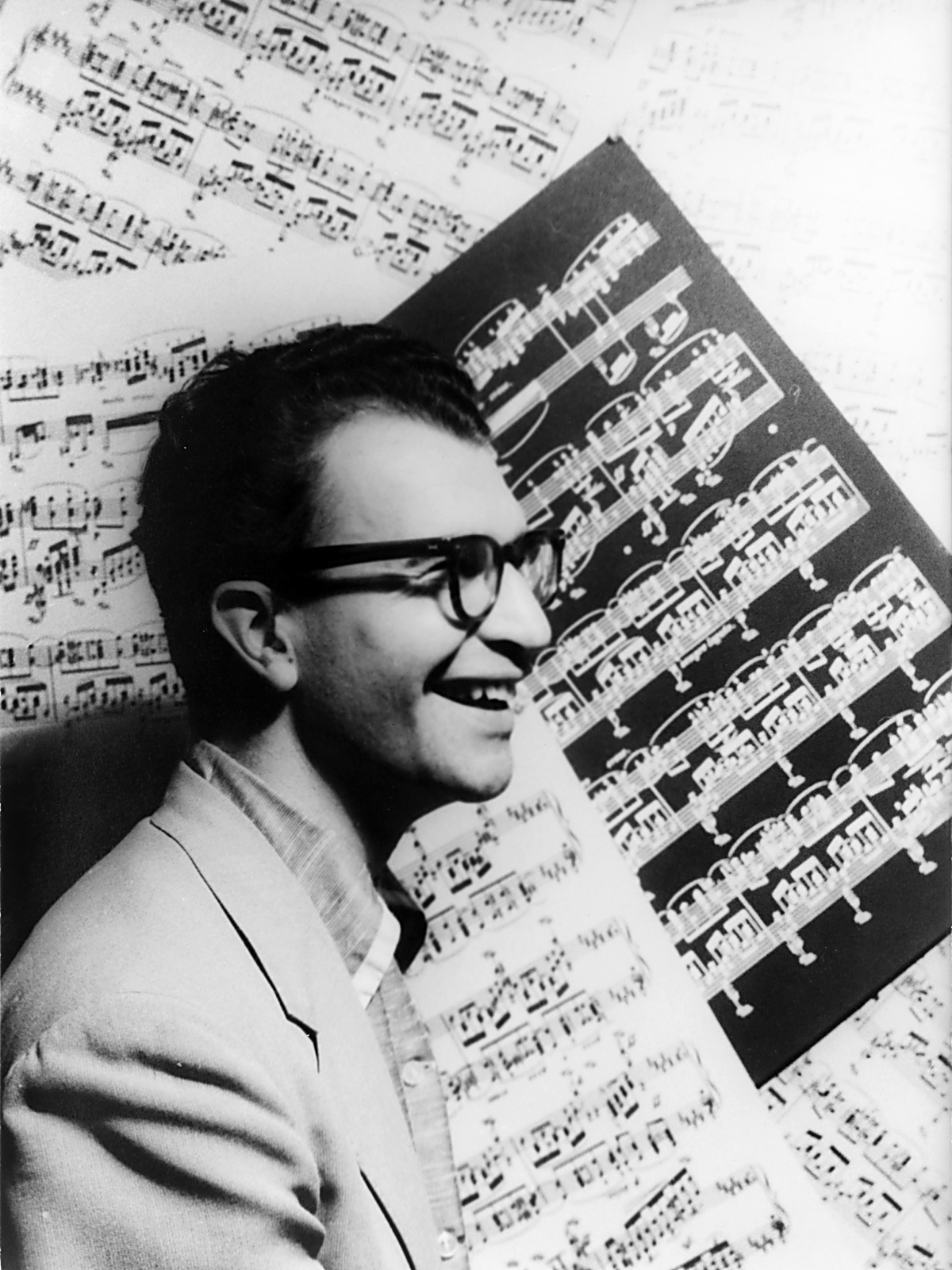
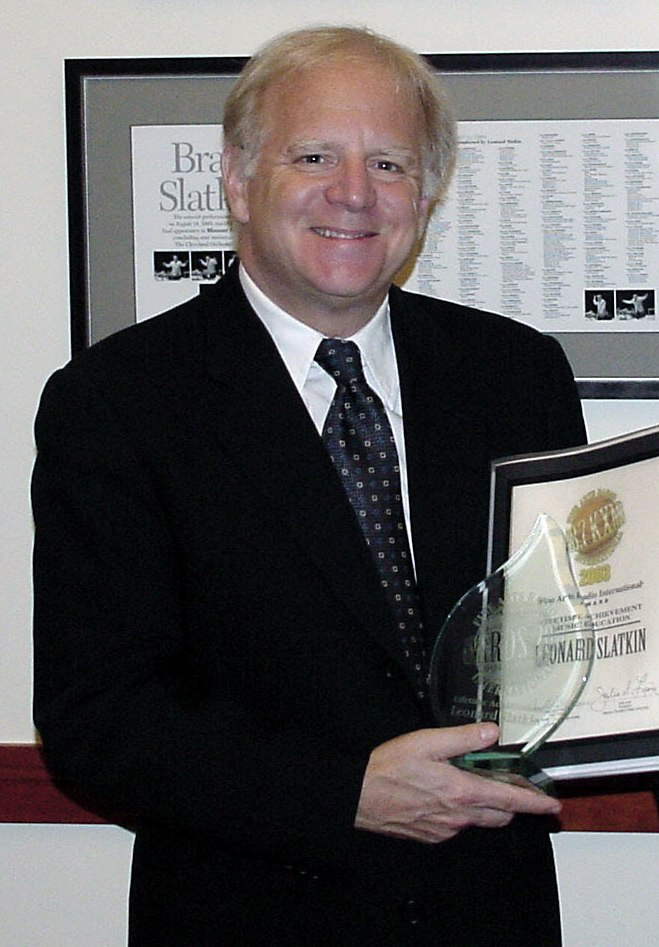
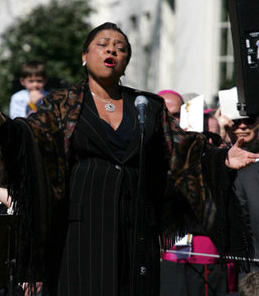
1970s performers included (left to right) Dave Brubeck, Leonard Slatkin, Aaron Copland and Kathleen Battle

In the 1970s, the Festival hosted soprano June Anderson, vocalist Gordon MacRae, pianists Dave Brubeck, Alicia de Larrocha, Jerome Lowenthal and Sheldon Shkolnik and violinists Elaine Skorodin. Dancers from both the Chicago City Ballet and New York City Ballet were also featured. Conductors included Mitch Miller, Leonard Slatkin, Aaron Copland and David Zinman. Dancer Edward Villella and soprano Kathleen Battle also made appearances.

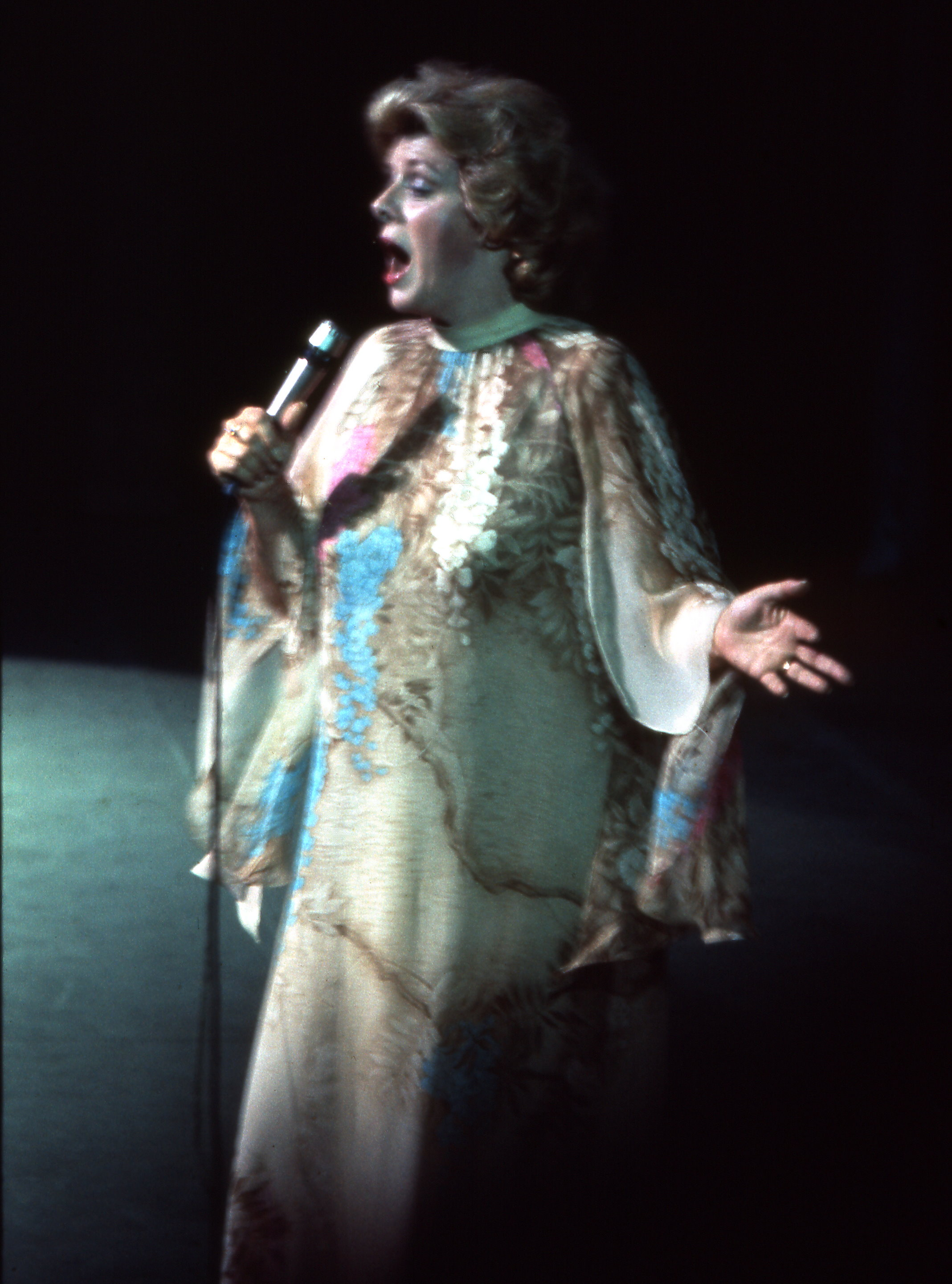
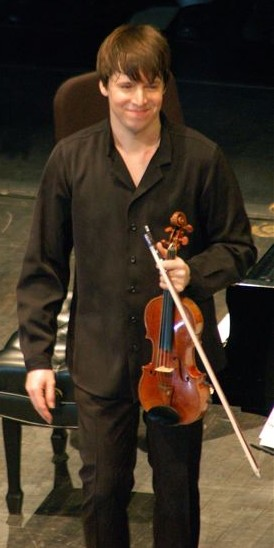
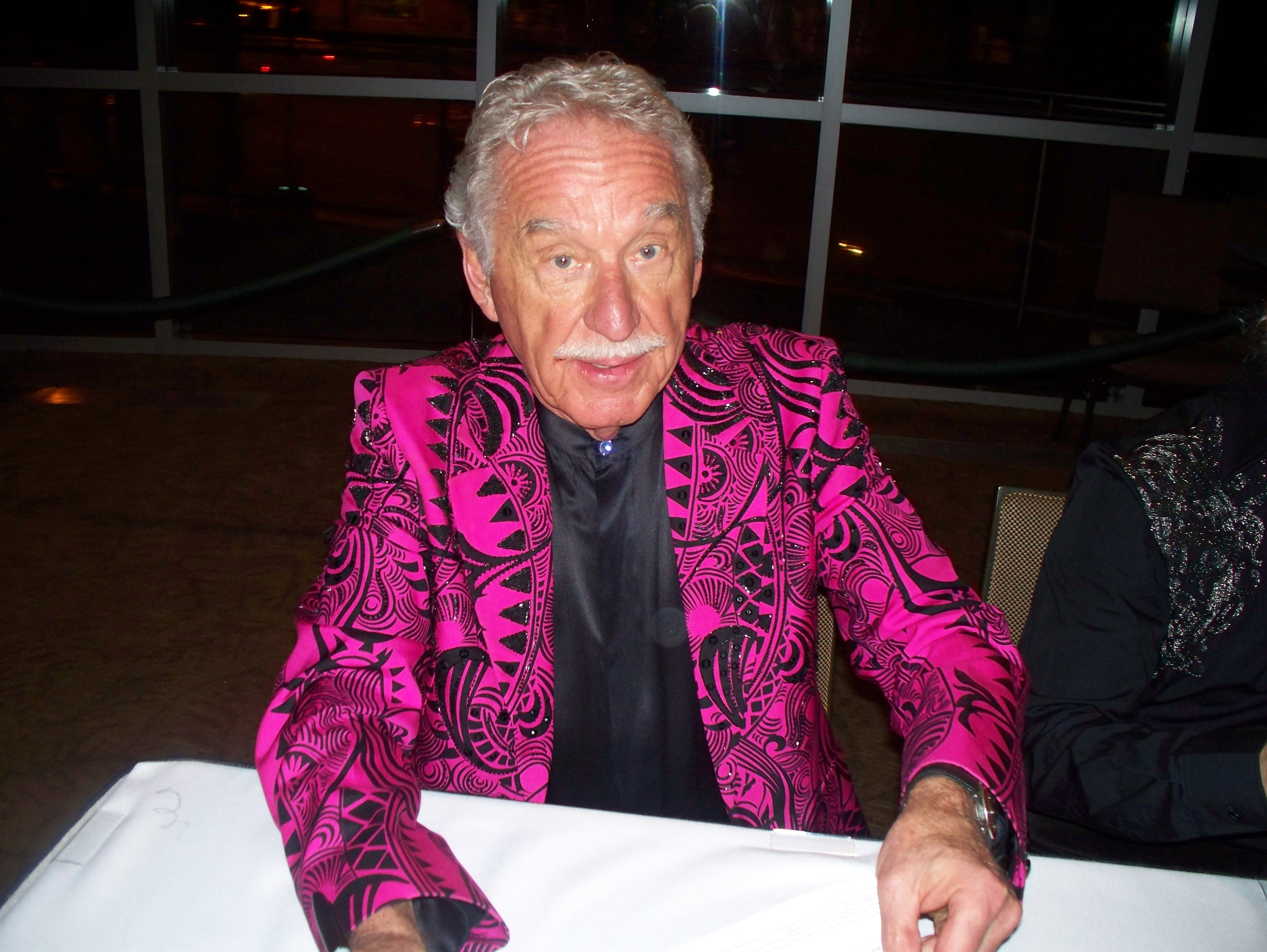
1980s and 1990s performers included (left to right) Rosemary Clooney, Joshua Bell and Doc Severinsen

In the 1980s, featured performers included pianists Walter Klein, Hollander, André Watts and Garrick Ohlsson, clarinetist Richard Stoltzman, the Vermeer Quartet, baritone Merrill, bass Paul Plishka, soprano Arleen Auger and harmonica player Corky Siegel. Conductors included Macal, Slatkin, Wolff, Zinman and Shaw.

Performers in the 1990s included Van Cliburn, mezzo-soprano Frederica von Stade, Rosemary Clooney, violinist Joshua Bell, conductor Maxim Shostakovich (who led works by his father Dmitry Shostakovich), trumpeter Doc Severinsen, and soprano Deborah Voigt.

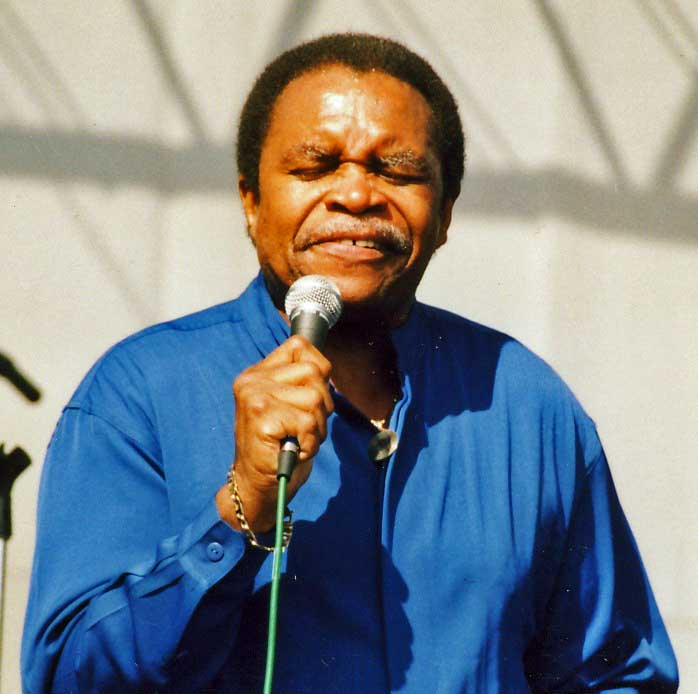
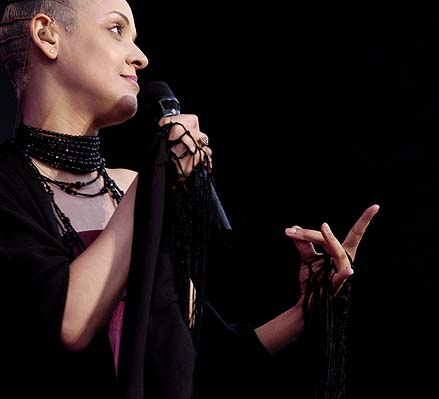
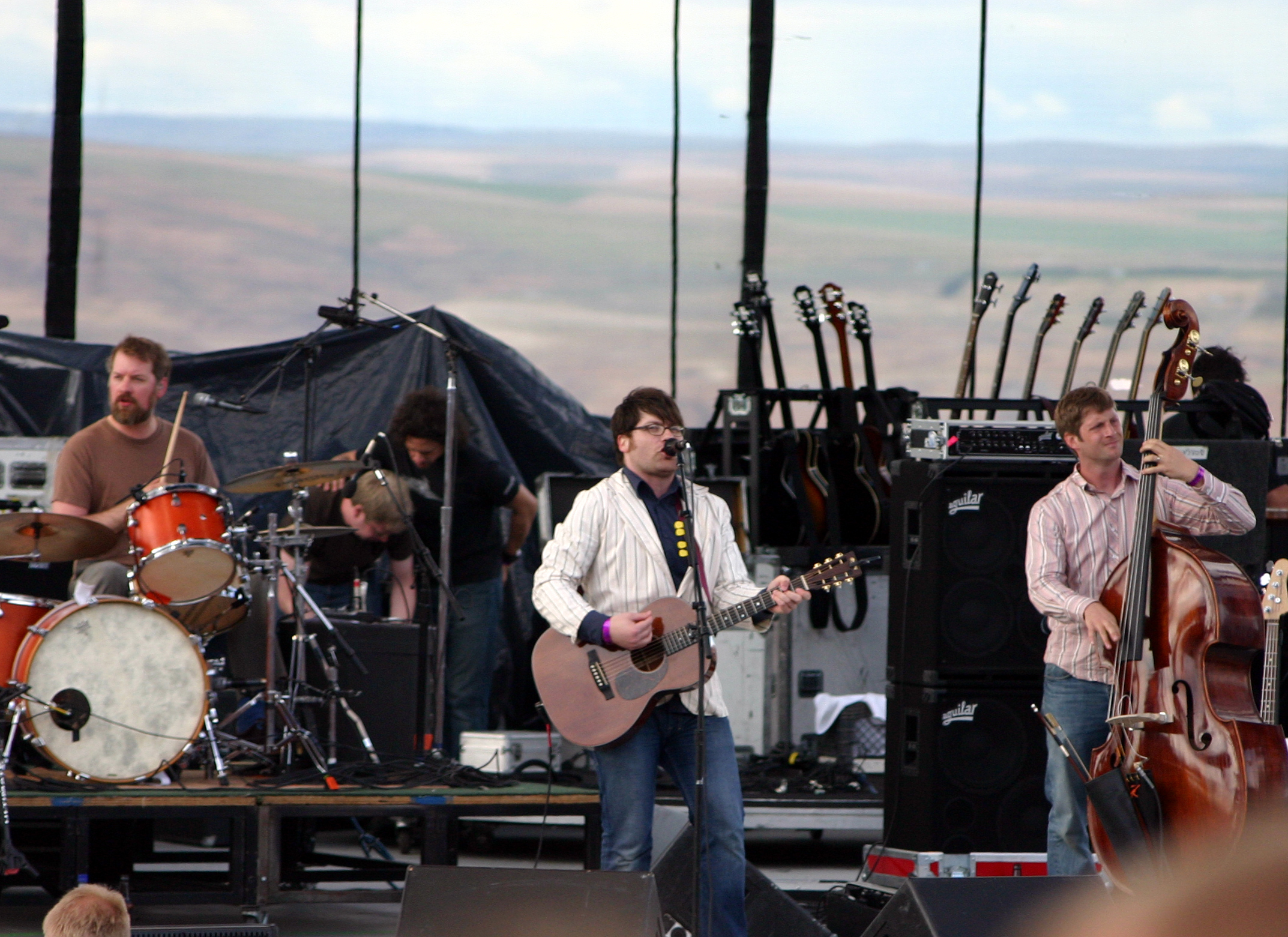
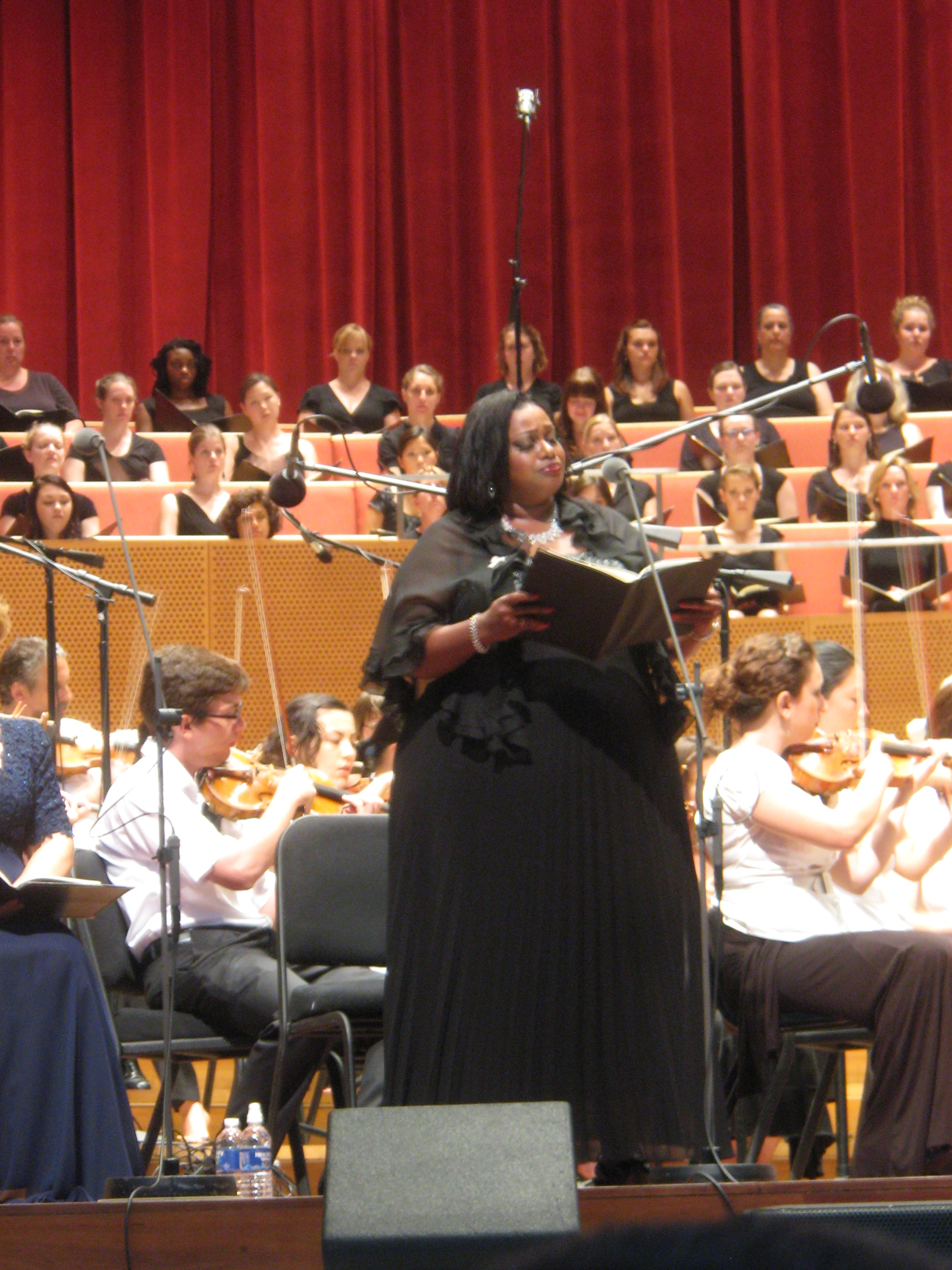
2000s (decade) performers included (left to right) Vittorio Grigolo, Otis Clay, Mariza, The Decemberists and Jonita Lattimore

In the new millennium's first decade the Festival welcomed sopranos Battle, Dawn Upshaw, Karina Gauvin and Erin Wall, tenor Vittorio Grigolo, pianist Stephen Hough, violinists Rachel Barton Pine, James Ehnes, Roby Lakatos, Christian Tetzlaff and Pinchas Zukerman, vocalists Otis Clay, Mariza and Maria del Mar Bonet and rock band The Decemberists. Other performers include pianist Valentina Lisitsa, soprano Jonita Lattimore, baritone Nathan Gunn and mezzo-soprano Jennifer Larmore. The Joffrey Ballet also performed with the Festival.

The current principal conductor is Giancarlo Guerrero. Guests in the 2026 season included Olga Kern, Anne Akiko Meyers, Michelle Cann, Lookingglass Theatre Company, Ben Folds, and many more performing the works of composers such as Brahms, Beethoven, Mozart, Florence Price, Tchaikovsky, Gershwin, and Copland.

The 2010s included a scheduled Grant Park's screening of the BBC's nature documentary Planet Earth Live on July 21, with live orchestral accompaniment featuring the composer George Fenton, who served as conductor.

== Reception ==
Frommer's describes the Festival as "One of the city's greatest bargains", and it notes that the series is popular. One of the special editions notes that the Festival is continuing to uphold its Depression era mission of lifting Chicagoans' hearts and suggests that you arrive at the Festival an hour early to get good lawn seats. It also notes that the daytime rehearsals are a good substitute for the evening performances.
