= Edward Ford =

Edward Ford may refer to:

- Edward Ford (surgeon) (1746–1809), British surgeon
- Edward Ford (courtier) (1910–2006), courtier in the Royal Household of King George VI and Queen Elizabeth II
- Edward Ford (soldier) (1605–1670), English soldier and inventor
- Edward Ford (physician) (1902–1986), Australian soldier, academic and physician
- Edward Onslow Ford (1852–1901), English sculptor
- Edward Ford (born 1914), brother of United States president Gerald Ford
- Edward Hastings Ford (1887–1970), vaudeville comedian who created the radio show Can You Top This?
- Edward E. Ford (1894–1963), American philanthropist and businessman serving on the board of directors of IBM
- Whitey Ford (Edward Charles Ford, 1928–2020), American baseball pitcher

== See also ==
- Edwin Ford (1861–1933), American founder of The Ford Meter Box Company, Inc.
- Eddie Ford (1917–1946), Australian rules footballer for Richmond
