= Justice Copeland =

Justice Copeland may refer to:

- J. William Copeland (1914–1988), associate justice of the North Carolina Supreme Court
- Joseph T. Copeland (1813–1893), associate justice of the Michigan Supreme Court
