= James Copeland =

James or Jim Copeland may refer to:

- James Copeland (outlaw) (1823–1857), American outlaw
- James Copeland (actor) (1918–2002), Scottish actor
- Jim Copeland (Canadian football) (born 1939), Canadian football player
- Jim Copeland (American football) (1945–2010), American football player and college athletics administrator
- Jim Copeland (cyclist) (born 1962), American cyclist
- J. William Copeland (1914–1988), American politician and jurist from North Carolina
