= Senator Copeland (disambiguation) =

Royal S. Copeland (1868–1938) was a U.S. Senator from New York from 1923 until 1938. Senator Copeland may also refer to:

- Charles L. Copeland (born 1963), Delaware State Senate
- J. William Copeland (1914–1988), North Carolina State Senate
- Joseph T. Copeland (1813–1893), Michigan State Senate
