= Copeland =

Copeland or Copeland's may refer to:

== Places ==
=== Australia ===
- Copeland, New South Wales

=== Canada ===
- Copeland Islands (Nunavut)
- Copeland Islands Marine Provincial Park, in the Strait of Georgia, British Columbia
- Mount Copeland, also Copeland Ridge and Copeland Creek in same vicinity, in the Monashee Mountains of British Columbia

=== United Kingdom ===
- Borough of Copeland, former local government area of Cumbria, England
  - Copeland (UK Parliament constituency)
  - An alternative name for Allerdale above Derwent, where the borough was named
- Copeland Islands, Northern Ireland

=== United States ===
- Copeland, Florida
- Copeland, Idaho
- Copeland, Kansas
- Copeland, Thomas County, Kansas
- Copeland, North Carolina
- Copeland, Texas, an unincorporated community in Smith County, Texas
- Copeland, Delaware County, Oklahoma, a census-designated place in Delaware County, Oklahoma
- Copeland, Virginia, an unincorporated community in Bath County, Virginia

== Other ==
- Copeland (band), an indie rock band
- Copeland (company), an American company
- Copland (operating system), Apple's abandoned OS upgrade to System 7
- Copeland (pottery), a former name of Spode, a brand of English pottery
- Copeland Bridge, a covered bridge in Edinburg, New York
- Copeland Lowery, a California lobbying firm
- Copeland Tower Suites, hotel in Metairie, Louisiana, a suburb of New Orleans
- Copeland Trophy, the award given to the best and fairest player for the Collingwood Football Club
- Copeland's, a restaurant chain
- Copeland's method, a voting system
- Copeland–Erdős constant

== See also ==
- Copland (disambiguation)
- Copeland Creek (disambiguation)
