= Jonita Lattimore =

American opera singer

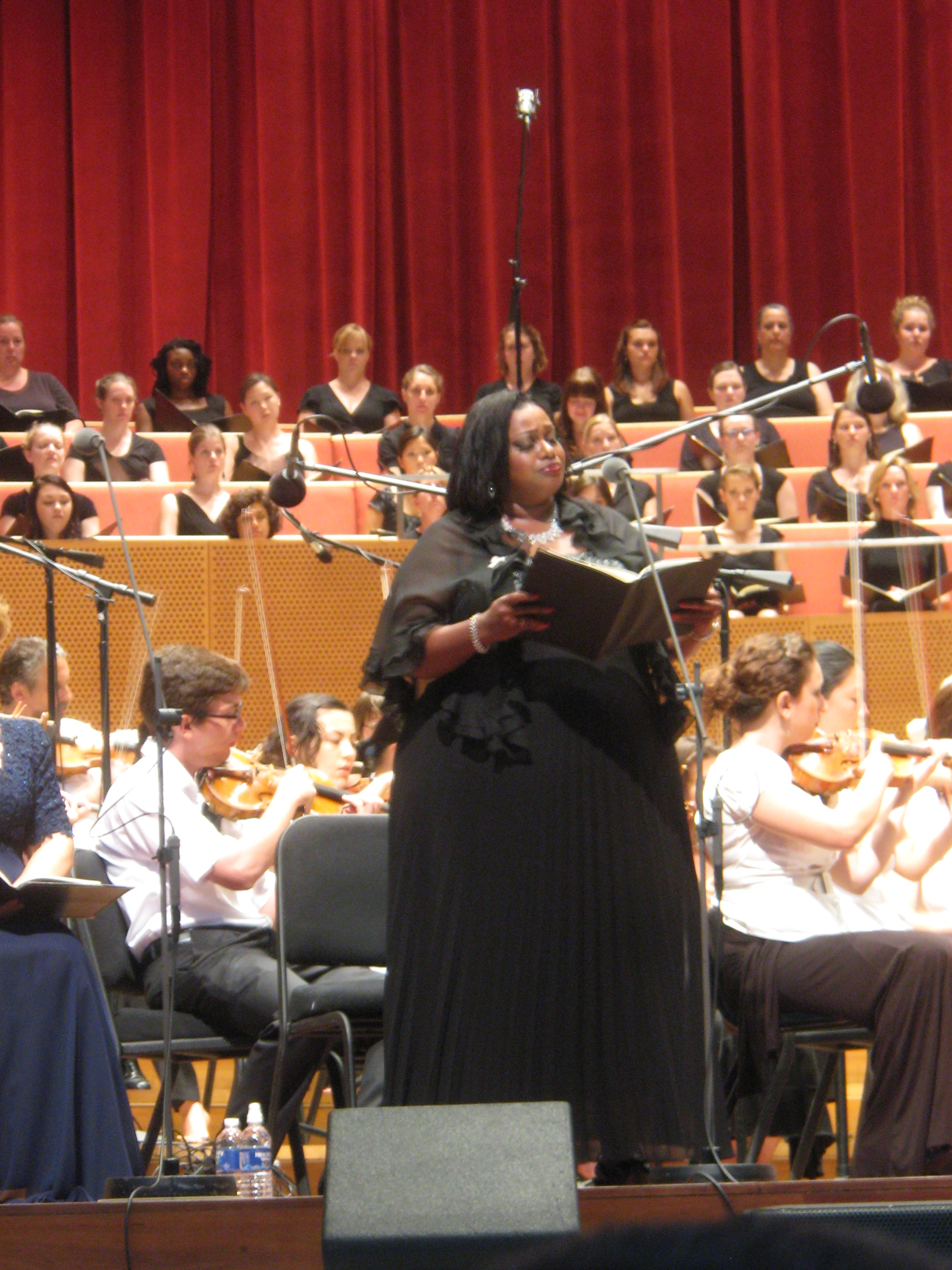
- Lattimore at the Grant Park Music Festival; July 23, 2010
- Born: December 13, 1969 (age 56); Chicago, Illinois, US
- Education: Eastman School of Music; University of Illinois
- Occupation: Opera singer (soprano)
- Years active: 1993–present

Jonita Lattimore (born December 13, 1969) is an American operatic soprano and a faculty member of Roosevelt University's Chicago College of Performing Arts. She is a lyric soprano from Chicago's South Side who has performed a wide range of operatic roles, as well as oratorio performances with major orchestras both internationally and domestically.

Lattimore performed with the Chicago Children's Choir and trained both voice and instruments as a youth. She obtained a vocal scholarship to the Eastman School of Music and obtained subsequent graduate training at University of Illinois at Urbana–Champaign. She then trained in two developmental artist programs: Houston Grand Opera's Opera Studio and Lyric Opera of Chicago's Center for American Artists.

Domestic highlights include having performed as part of the Grant Park Music Festival's celebration of the grand opening night at the Jay Pritzker Pavilion and with the Boston Landmarks Orchestra in their first performance at their current home, Hatch Memorial Shell. Her first decade as a touring professional saw her become one of, if not, the leading operatic soprano in Chicago: she not only opened the city's new outdoor performing venue in 2004, but also was the choice as the soprano to perform in the 2009 citywide celebration of the centennial of the 1909 Plan of Chicago and has been scheduled for yearly appearances at the Grant Park Music Festival.

Her international performances have included engagements at the Opéra Bastille and the Edinburgh Festival. She has performed with the Tonkünstler Orchestra, Northern Israel Symphony, Opole Philharmonic, Orquestra Metropolitana de Lisboa, Calgary Philharmonic and Orquesta Sinfonica Nacional de Mexico.

== Personal ==
Jonita Lattimore was born in Chicago on December 13, 1969. Raised in her native city, she began taking piano lessons at age three. She also played the trumpet. She performed with the Chicago Children's Choir as a youth and was a frequent soloist. She took piano lessons in Oak Park, Illinois from Angela Wright. She was raised in the Pill Hill neighborhood of Chicago's South Side. Lattimore attended Kenwood Academy in the Kenwood community area, which is also on the South Side. Upon graduation in 1987, she attended The University of Rochester's Eastman School of Music on the William Warfield scholarship, a vocal scholarship named after her mentor, William Warfield. She pursued graduate studies at the University of Illinois.

Lattimore is from a family of musicians: she has a Rhythm and blues and jazz musician younger brother named Alex, a father who performed in a vocal quartet, aunts who sang (one professionally), a music teacher for a grandmother and another grandmother who was a singer and violinist. Her paternal grandmother lived with her and had taught music and math at Piney Woods Country Life School where she took a music group on regular national tours. Lattimore has a daughter Joyelle, who was age five in December 2008. Lattimore was the soprano soloist in Robert Avalon's 1998 Sextet de Julia de Burgos.

Lattimore's father, Joseph, was a recurring contributor to the oral history musings of Studs Terkel. Lattimore was an insurance salesman whose thoughts were depicted in Terkels works such as Working: People Talk About What They Do All Day and How They Feel About What They Do and Race: What Blacks and Whites Think and Feel About the American Obsession. His interviews with Terkel that were incorporated in these works continue to be available to the public.

Lattimore has earned numerous awards, including honors from the Birgit Nilsson Competition, the Luciano Pavarotti International Voice Competition, the Sullivan and George London Foundations, and Opera Index, Inc. In 1999, at age 29, she was named by the Chicago Sun-Times in their Chicago's arts and entertainment scene 30 under 30 series. The following year, they named her as one of the 25 most intriguing Chicagoans. Lattimore teaches at Roosevelt University's The Music Conservatory of Chicago College of Performing Arts. She has been profiled on Artbeat Chicago, an arts television program on WTTW, which is Chicago's Public Broadcast Service affiliate in an episode entitled "Home Grown Diva", and WTTW also featured her on Opera Philes, a program of favorite opera arias and ensembles.

== Career ==
=== Training ===
In 1993, Lattimore performed with the Chicago Opera Theater. She appeared in their production of composer Virgil Thomson and librettist Gertrude Stein's Four Saints in Three Acts. She also performed as the leading soprano in the Goodman Theater's August 1993 adaptation of Alan Paton's Cry, the Beloved Country. In 1994, Lattimore began performing with the Houston Grand Opera Studio, a young artist training program at the Houston Grand Opera (HGO). She also appeared as a soloist with the Houston Symphony. During the 1995 Luciano Pavarotti International Voice Competition, Pavarotti personally selected her to advance to the finals. In 1995, her HGO performance in Bright Sheng's The Song of Majnun became part of her early discography. One of her 1996 Houston Symphony performances was as part of a sextet that performed "Libiamo ne' lieti calici" from Verdi's La traviata. In 1997, when the HGO commissioned Jackie O from Michael Daugherty, Lattimore played the Liz Taylor role. That same year, she performed in the HGO's performance of Wolfgang Amadeus Mozart's The Magic Flute as one of the Three Ladies. Also in 1997, she performed a music from Charles Gounod's Faust on multiple occasions. Later that year in an opera about Carlota of Mexico, she sang an aria. She continued as a featured performer with the Houston Symphony in 1998. Among her other performances with the Houston Grand Opera, were the world premieres of Harvey Milk by Stewart Wallace and The Tibetan Book of the Dead by Ricky Ian Gordon. She made her Paris debut in a performance at the Opéra Bastille performing as Serena in Porgy and Bess.

In 1998, she worked with the Lyric Opera of Chicago's Center for American Artists, which focuses on developing young singers. She debuted for the Lyric Opera of Chicago in Kurt Weill's The Rise and Fall of the City of Mahagonny. That year, she performed Michaela's prayer from Georges Bizet's Carmen on the July 4 fireworks celebration at Navy Pier with accompaniment from Grant Park Symphony Orchestra. She continued training with the Center through 1999 when she performed Handel's Alcina and Verdi's La traviata: Dite alla giovine at the center's open house. In March 1999, she was featured in the 20th Anniversary season final concert of the Charlotte Symphony Orchestra, where she performed Mozart's Exsultate, jubilate, Carlisle Floyd's "Trees on the Mountain" from "Susannah" and George Gershwin's "My Man's Gone Now" from Porgy and Bess. In 1999, she was one of four center artists to return for a second year in the 12 member program. She performed as Donna Anna in Mozart's Don Giovanni. That year she served as a featured performer for the Grant Park Music Festival featuring music from Edvard Grieg's Peer Gynt and Gustav Holst's First Choral Symphony under the baton of James Paul. She earned the role of Michela in the Center's 1999–2000 season-ending production of Carmen. In 2000, she returned as a featured performer in a quartet that sang Schoenberg's A Survivor From Warsaw op. 46 and Beethoven's, Symphony No. 9 in D Minor, op. 125, "Choral" at the Grant Park Music Festival. In 2000, her Dame Myra Hess Recital Series and Ravinia season box-office opening performances were broadcast live over WFMT.

=== Touring career ===
After two years in the Lyric Opera's Center for American Artists, she graduated and began touring internationally. In December 2000, she stood out in the Concertante di Chicago performance featuring the works of Samuel Barber such as Knoxville: Summer of 1915. That same month, she performed from Bach's St Matthew Passion, St John Passion, Cantata 151 and Jauchzet Gott as well as a world premiere of Five Songs of Laurence Hope by Henry Burleigh as part of American Concerto Orchestra, an ensemble of Chicago's leading musicians. In 2001, she performed with the Tulsa Opera in Mozart's The Marriage of Figaro as Countess Almaviva. She was featured in the Chicago Sinfonietta's 2001 Martin Luther King, Jr. Day tribute. In May 2001, she performed Leonard Bernstein's Songfest with the Chicago Sinfonietta.

She made appearances in 2001 and 2002 with the Houston Symphony. In February 2002, she teamed again with Gordon for a celebration of the centennial of Langston Hughes' birth in musical theater with his words set to music at the Dayton Art Institute in a performance entitled Only Heaven. In March 2002, she appeared again with the Tulsa Opera in Don Giovanni as Donna Anna. During an April 2002 performance with the Buffalo Philharmonic Orchestra at Kleinhans Music Hall, she was singled out from a quartet of soloists for the only solo curtain call. Also in April 2002, she performed Antonín Dvořák's Requiem with the Tonkunstler Orchestra of Vienna. Her 2002 appearance at the Grant Park Music Festival included performances of Ildebrando Pizzetti's De profundis and Brahms' A German Requiem in July. She also performed Brahms' Requiem in her debut with the Northern Israel Symphony. She also took part in the June opening weekend of the 2002 festival by performing Bernstein's Symphony No. 3 ("Kaddish"). During the 2002–03 season, she performed spirituals and operatic arias with Poland's Opole Philharmonic. That season, she also appeared on the final weekend schedule in August.

In 2003, she performed with the Chicago Sinfonietta Her 2003 Grant Park Music Festival appearance was for an All-Mozart concert. Later that summer, she performed with the Boston Landmarks Orchestra, in a presentation entitled "Three Landmarks Sopranos" featuring arias and show tunes from Mozart, Verdi, and Gershwin. She also presented world premiere ensemble work for three sopranos entitled May We Live that was composed by Boston's Patricia Van Ness. Internationally, she performed at the Edinburgh Festival and made her Italian debut with the Orchestra della Toscana in both concerts and radio performances.

In 2004, she performed at the Chicago Gospel Music Festival as a special guest in a tribute to Mahalia Jackson. She performed at the opening night of the Jay Pritzker Pavilion during the opening weekend of Millennium Park as well as a performance two nights earlier at the Park's Harris Theater. She was featured in a duet from Richard Strauss' Arabella. When the Harris Theater decided to dedicated its spring 2005 season to the memory of Irving B. Harris, Lattimore opened the season as part of a tribute to Marian Anderson and Mahalia Jackson. Also, in 2005, she performed at the 20th anniversary season-ending Concertante di Chicago show.

During the 2006–07 season, she also performed a Christmas concert tour with the Orquestra Metropolitana de Lisboa, Beethoven's Symphony No. 9 with the Calgary Philharmonic, Verdi's Requiem with Helena Symphony and a program entitled "Dvorak & American Soul," presented by New York Festival of Song. Also that season, she returned to perform with the Houston Symphony on Heitor Villa-Lobos' Three Songs from Floresta do Amazonas. Lattimore performed in the 2007 King Day celebration by Chicago Sinfonietta. In February 2008, she returned to the New York Festival of Song for its 20th anniversary season at Carnegie Hall for the "Harry, Hoagy & Harold" performance. On January 28, 2008 she performed with the Oakland East Bay Symphony in Verdi's Requiem. She appearanced with the Louisiana Philharmonic under Carlos Miguel Prieto with Gershwin selections on May 9 and 10, 2008. Her 2008 performance at the Grant Park Music Festival was of Tchaikovsky's 6th and Karol Szymanowski's Stabat Mater on July 9 and 11.

In 2008, Lattimore helped enable the Lyric Opera of Chicago overcome the strict all-black cast racial requirement of Gershwin's estate in a production of his 1935 opera Porgy and Bess in the role of Serena. Her performances of "Oh Doctor Jesus" and "My Man's Gone Now" were praised. It was the first time the Lyric Opera had performed Porgy and Bess since Warfield and Leontyne Price starred in it at the Civic Opera House in 1952. She has been featured by the Houston Symphony as recently as 2009. In June, she helped Chicago celebrate the centennial of Daniel Burnham's 1909 Plan of Chicago by performing a commissioned work by Michael Torke entitled Plans at the Grant Park Music Festival on June 19 and 20, 2009. Another one of her 2009 performances at the Grant Park Music Festival was with the Luna Negra Dance Theater. Other 2008-09 highlights included Gabriel Fauré's Requiem with Eugene Symphony and Verdi's Requiem with both the Virginia Symphony Orchestra and Colorado Symphony Orchestra.

In September 2009, she performed with the Orquesta Sinfonica Nacional de Mexico.

== Discography ==
- The Song of Majnun (1997)
- Sonota for Violin & Piano, OP.6 - Son. for Flute & Piano, OP.26 - Sextet to Julia De Burgos, OP.21 (1998)
- Violin Sonata, Flute Sonata, Sextet with Soprano (1999)
- Only Heaven: A Musical Work by Ricky Ian Gordon (2002)
- Let Me Fly: Music of Struggle Solace & Survival in Black America (2006)
