= William Copeland =

William Copeland may refer to:

- J. William Copeland (1914–1988), American politician and jurist from North Carolina
- William Copeland (brewer) (1834–1902), Norwegian-American brewer
- William Copeland (historian) (1936–2023), Finnish-American historian
- William Copeland (umpire) (1929–2011), Australian test cricket umpire
- William Fowler Mountford Copeland (1872–1953), British horticulturist
- William L. Copeland (1846–1885), American state legislator and police officer from Arkansas
- William H. Copeland (1848–1931), American state legislator from Ohio
- William Taylor Copeland (1797–1868), British businessman and politician
