= Edward Copeland (disambiguation) =

Edward Copeland or Ed Copeland might refer to:

- Edward Copeland, English footballer
- Ted Copeland, English football coach
- Eddie Copeland, Irish republican
- Edmund Copeland, University of Nottingham professor of physics
