= Earl W. Vaughn =

American judge

Earl Wray Vaughn (June 17, 1928 – April 1, 1986) was an American lawyer, politician and jurist. He served for five terms in the North Carolina House of Representatives, the last as Speaker. He then served for almost sixteen years as a Judge, and later Chief Judge, of the North Carolina Court of Appeals. He was appointed to the North Carolina Supreme Court in 1985, but only served seven months before having to retire due to a sudden diagnosis of terminal lung and brain cancer.

== Early life, military service and education ==
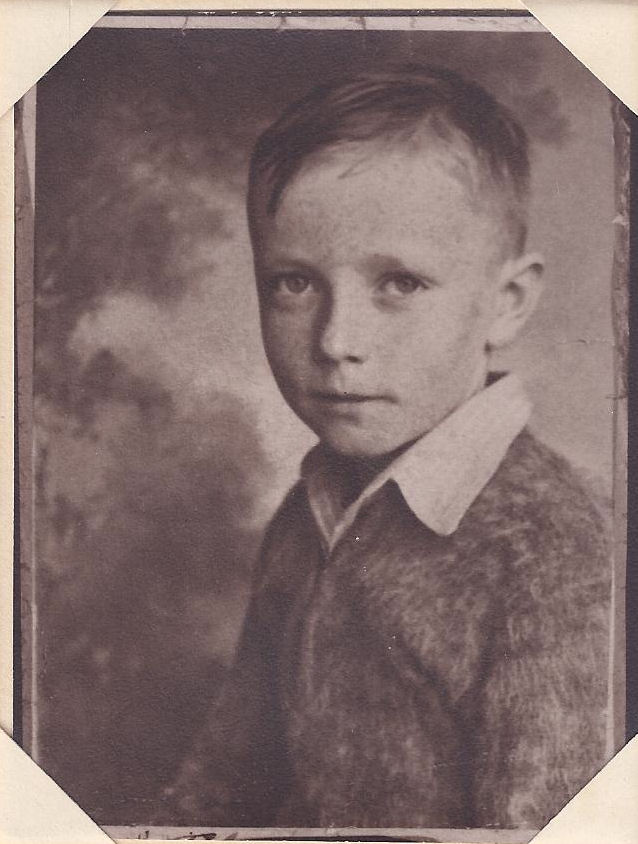
Earl Vaughn at age 6

Earl Wray Vaughn was born on June 17, 1928, to John H. and Lelia F. Vaughn in their farmhouse in the Oregon Hill community of Rockingham County, North Carolina. He was the youngest of eleven children.

While in school, Vaughn assisted with tobacco work on his parents’ farm. He attended Ruffin High School and graduated in 1945. To earn extra money during high school he drove a school bus. He then entered Pfeiffer Junior College in Misenheimer, North Carolina, as the first in his family to attend college. He enrolled as a "self-help student," which meant he worked at the school to pay his way. Part of his duties teamed him with fellow student and future North Carolina General Representative Samuel H. Johnson, requiring them to rise at 3:30 a.m. each morning to tend to the campus boiler before attending morning classes. During his second year at Pfeiffer, Vaughn dropped out in order to enter military service in the United States Army. He served for two years, spending time in Korea, before he was honorably discharged as a sergeant.

Following his discharge, he used the benefits of the G.I. Bill to continue his education at the University of North Carolina at Chapel Hill. He received his B.A. Degree in 1950, then entered the University of North Carolina at Chapel Hill Law School. While enrolled at the law school, Vaughn resided in a Quonset hut with classmate and lifelong friend Jack Worsham. They later moved to a trailer located in what was then known as the Vance Pettigrew Trailer Park located in the middle of campus, just behind a stone wall on Franklin Street. Vaughn was awarded his J.D. degree in 1952 and passed the North Carolina bar exam that August.

== Career ==
After being accepted to the bar, Vaughn became General Counsel to a trucking firm in Greensboro, North Carolina. He then decided to return to his home county of Rockingham to open a private law practice as a sole practitioner in Draper. In 1964, Vaughn moved his practice to the larger, adjoining town of Leakesville, where he formed a partnership for the practice of law with Thomas S. Harrington. The firm enjoyed a substantial general practice which covered several Piedmont counties in the state.

Vaughn served as City Attorney for Draper from 1955 until 1967, when the towns of Draper, Leaksville, and Spray merged to form the new town of Eden, a merging Vaughn was involved in bringing about. He served as Eden town attorney until 1969, and served as prosecuting attorney for the Leaksville Recorders Court from 1959 to 1960.

=== North Carolina House of Representatives ===
In 1960, Vaughn was elected to represent Rockingham County in the State House of Representatives.

Vaughn was involved in a number of notable projects while serving in the North Carolina House. During his first term, the 1961-63 session, Vaughn immediately had to cast hard votes to raise revenue to pay for much needed improvements to the North Carolina education system. Vaughn was also very active in getting legislation passed to extend the community college and technical institute programs in our state. He was one of the primary movers in starting Rockingham Community College, for which he served as a trustee from 1963 until 1970.

In the 1965 session, Vaughn chaired the House Committee on Public Utilities, at a time during which there was a three-way fight between the private-investor companies, the Rural Electric Membership Corporation, and the cities and towns retailing electricity. He also served as the Vice Chair of the Committee on Corporations during which time the legislature was considering whether or not North Carolina should adopt the Uniform Commercial Code (UCC). During the same session, he also served on the committee that took primary charge of creating legislation to establish the North Carolina District Court system, a uniform system of courts below the Superior Court level. During a special session of the General Assembly, called by Governor Dan K. Moore in the Fall of 1965, despite pressure from supporters to oppose any amendments, Vaughn voted for and supported changes to the controversial Speaker Ban law.

In 1966, Vaughn was appointed to the North Carolina Courts Commission. The Commission had been created by the 1963 General Assembly to make recommendations to improve the North Carolina court system. In the Fall of 1965 a constitutional amendment had been approved authorizing the Legislature to create an intermediate Court of Appeals. As a member of the Commission, Vaughn was deeply involved in creating the report and final recommendations on creating the Court of Appeals for the General Assembly.

In 1967, at the age of 39, he was designated to serve as Speaker pro tem for the 1967 session and he was unanimously selected by his Democratic colleagues to be majority leader during the 1967 session. Vaughn also accepted the chairmanship of the House committee on courts, which oversaw legislation to create the Court of Appeals. Successfully enacted, the law provided that the court would originally have six members, to be appointed by the Governor in 1967. It also provided that as of 1 July 1969 the membership of the Court would be increased to nine and authorized the Governor serving at that time to appoint the additional three members. When then-Speaker David M. Britt resigned the day before the end of the legislative session to accept an appointment to the newly created Court of Appeals, Vaughn was chosen to complete Britt’s term as Speaker.

During 1967-69, Vaughn was also instrumental in laying the groundwork for the North Carolina Zoo, which was later developed in Asheboro, NC.

In 1968 the voters of Rockingham County overwhelmingly elected Earl W. Vaughn to the state House of Representatives for a fifth term. This led the way for Vaughn’s unanimous selection by the membership to be elected Speaker of the NC House of Representatives for the 1969 – 1970 session. Former Pfeiffer and UNC Law School classmate, and current state representative Samuel H. Johnson gave the nominating speech. While serving as Speaker, Vaughn oversaw negotiations and legislation concerning revenue and provision of state-provided services.

As a state representative, some of Vaughn's service outside the Legislature included:

- Chairman, Council of State Governments
- Member, Committee for the Economic Development of the South
- Director, Regional Educational Laboratory of the South
- Member, North Carolina Courts Commission
- Member, North Carolina Commission on Federal and Interstate Cooperation
- Co-Chairman, Legislative Research Commission
- Director, Zoological Foundation, Inc.
- Trustee, Rockingham County Community College
- Trustee, Draper Methodist Church
- President, Rockingham County Bar Association

=== North Carolina Court of Appeals ===
As the 1969 session drew to a close, Vaughn resigned as Speaker to accept appointment by Governor Robert W. Scott to the North Carolina Court of Appeals. He was sworn in on July 23, 1969. Vaughn served on the Court of Appeals for fifteen and a half years. Joining the Court just two years after its creation, he played a vital part in getting the Court firmly established and accepted as an important part of the state’s judicial system. About the time he came on the Court, it began considering cases involving substantial changes in many areas of the law made by the General Assembly while Vaughn served in that body. These areas included public utilities, the Uniform Commercial Code, Rules of Civil Procedure and jurisdiction of the courts.

On January 3, 1983, Vaughn was sworn in as Chief Judge of the Court of Appeals, having been appointed to that position by Chief Justice Joseph Branch of the North Carolina Supreme Court. He served as chief judge for two years. During that time he devoted his best efforts to devising means of improving operating procedures of the Court.

=== North Carolina Supreme Court ===
Following the retirement of Justice J. William Copeland from the state Supreme Court in December 1984, Governor Jim Hunt appointed Vaughn to fill the vacancy on the Court. He was administered the oath as Associate Justice on January 2, 1985. Some three months later, Vaughn was advised that he was terminally ill with lung and brain cancer and on July 31, 1985 retired from the court.

== Death ==
Although he waged a valiant fight in his battle against cancer, Vaughn died in Rex Hospital in Raleigh, North Carolina on April 1, 1986. His funeral was held in Edenton Street United Methodist Church, of which he was a member. He was buried in the Orange United Methodist Church Cemetery in Chapel Hill.

== Personal life ==
On December 20, 1952, Vaughn married Eloise Freeland Maddry, a fellow student at UNC-CH whom he met in Wilson Library on campus where Eloise worked part-time as a librarian. They had four children. John Maddry Vaughn of Washington, NC, Stuart Earl Vaughn of Wilmington, NC, Rose Vaughn Williams of Raleigh, NC, and Mark Foster Vaughn. Son Mark died of AIDS in 1990 at the age of 34. Eloise has been a crusader for AIDS victims, organizing a committee known as Mothers Against Jesse in Congress (MAJIC), an initiative to defeat U.S. Senator Jesse Helms in Congress because of the stance he took in opposing those afflicted with AIDS. She later co-authored a book Keep Singing, still available in both electronic and print editions.

Vaughn was active in the Methodist Church. He served as president of the Draper Rotary Club, as a member of the Tri-City Rescue Squad, as president of the Rockingham County Bar Association, and as secretary-treasurer of the county Democratic Executive Committee. During the summer of 1974 Vaughn hiked a portion of the Appalachian Trail with two of his sons, taking special measures to stop in populated areas to catch up on the resignation of President Richard M. Nixon. For about 25 years Vaughn also enjoyed deer hunting each Thanksgiving with friends at the camp of Monroe Redden Jr. in Mills River, NC near Hendersonville.
