= Thomas Copeland =

British surgeon

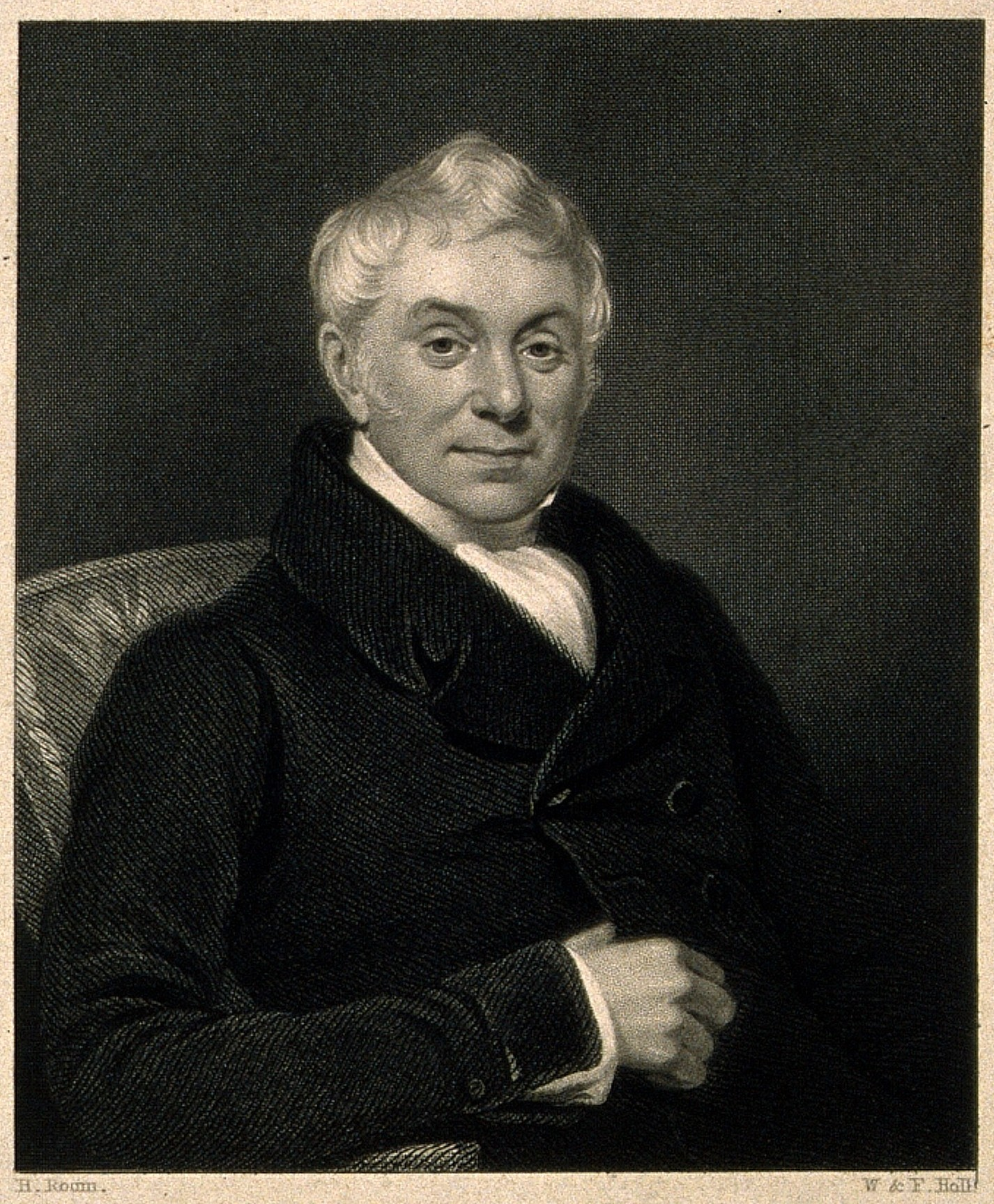
Portrait. Credit: Wellcome Collection

Thomas Copeland (1781 – 19 November 1855) was a British surgeon.

== Life ==
Copeland, son of the Rev. William Copeland, curate of Byfield, Northamptonshire (1747–1787), was born in May 1781, studied under Mr. Denham at Chigwell in Essex, and in London under Edward Ford, his maternal uncle. He afterwards attended the medical classes at Great Windmill Street School and at St. Bartholomew's Hospital. On 6 July 1804, he was admitted a member of the Royal College of Surgeons, and on the 14th of the same month was appointed an assistant surgeon in the 1st Foot Guards. He embarked with his regiment for Spain under Sir John Moore, and was present at the battle of Corunna in 1809.

On his return to England and retirement from the army, finding that his uncle was declining practice, Copeland occupied his residence, 4 Golden Square, and having been appointed surgeon to the Westminster General Dispensary, he at once entered into a large connection, chiefly among the aristocracy.

In 1810 he brought out Observations on the Diseases of the Hip-joint, by E. Ford; edited and revised with additions, by T. Copeland. In the same year he published Observations on some of the principal Diseases of the Rectum, a work which ran to three editions. His new and scientific treatment of these diseases established his reputation and fairly earned for him the distinction of being the founder of rectum surgery. As a consulting surgeon in this class of maladies his opinion in the west end of London was in much request. He was the first to suggest the removal of the septum narium by means of an ingeniously contrived pair of forceps, in cases where its oblique position obstructed the passage of air through the nostrils.

He was elected a Fellow of the Royal Society on 6 February 1834, and in 1843 became an honorary F.R.C.S. For a time he was a member of the council of the College of Surgeons, and became surgeon-extraordinary to Queen Victoria in 1837. He removed to 17 Cavendish Square in 1842, but his health failing him he limited his practice from that period. He was also the author of Observations on the Symptoms and Treatment of the Diseased Spine, more particularly relating to the Incipient Stages, 1815; a second edition appeared in 1818 and the work was translated into several European languages. Among his contributions to professional journals was a paper entitled History of a Case in which a Calculus was voided from a Tumour in the Groin (Trans. Med.-Chir. Soc. iii. 191).

He died from an attack of jaundice at Brighton on 19 November 1855. His wife died on 5 December 1855. He left £180,000, bequeathing £5,000 both to the Asylum for Poor Orphans of the Clergy, and to the Society for the Relief of Widows and Orphans of Medical Men.
