= Edward Ford (surgeon) =

British surgeon

Edward Ford (1746–1809) was a British surgeon.

== Life ==
Ford was the [grand] son of Thomas Ford, prebendary of St. Decuman, Wells, and vicar of Banwell and of Wookey, Somersetshire, who died 29 Aug of the same year. He received his medical training under Dr. John Ford, then in practice at Bristol. At an early age he settled as a surgeon in London, was admitted a member of the court of assistants of the Royal College of Surgeons, acquired an excellent practice, and was greatly liked.

In 1780 he was appointed surgeon to the Westminster General Dispensary, which office he resigned, after more than twenty years' service, on 16 July 1801. At this time, the finances of the charity being very low, Ford generously presented it with the arrears of his salary, amounting altogether to four hundred guineas, and his example was followed by the physicians to the institution, Drs. Foart Simmons and Robert Bland.

He died 15 Sept. 1809 at Sherborne, Dorset, when on his way from Weymouth to Bath.

== Writings ==
Besides papers in various medical serials Ford was author of a valuable treatise entitled Observations on the Disease of the Hip Joint; to which are added some Remarks on White Swellings of the Knee … illustrated by cases and engravings, 8vo, London, 1794, of which revised editions were published in 1810 and 1818 by his nephew and successor Thomas Copeland, to whom he bequeathed his house in Golden Square, London, and a considerable legacy.

== Honors ==
He was elected a fellow of the Society of Antiquaries, 3 May 1792.

== Family ==
He was twice married. His first wife, Sarah Frances, daughter of Hugh Josiah Hansard, died in 1783, and was buried at Hillingdon, Middlesex.
