= Thomas Copeland (schoolmaster) =

15th-century master of Sherborne School

Thomas Copeland (living 1437) was the schoolmaster at Sherborne School in the reign of Henry VI of England.

== Life ==
Copeland's origins are obscure, although the surname was found predominantly in Cumbria, Cheshire, and Yorkshire, then as now.

Copeland's name appears on two lists dated 1437 of subscribers to the foundation of an almshouse at Sherborne, provided for ‘Twelve pore feeble and ympotent old men and four old women’ to be cared for by a housewife whose duty was to ‘feeche in and dyght to the victaill wash wrying make beddys and al other things do’.

The Foundation Deed for the almshouse is dated 10 January 1437. Copeland is recorded as a magister scholarum (schoolmaster) living in 'Chepstrett' (modern day Cheap Street, still the principal high street of the town).

Copeland's donation of three shillings and fourpence made him one of the largest contributors to the almshouse. The licence of King Henry VI to found the Almshouse is dated 11 July 1437. The building was completed in 1448 and consisted of a Chapel (completed by 1442) and a hall, with dormitories above. The Almshouse was dedicated to St John The Baptist and St John The Evangelist; a fine doorway with niches and statues of the two Saints John provided the main entrance from Trendle Street.

== Caricature ==
A Miserere seat in Sherborne Abbey, that has been dated to 1436–59, is carved with the representation of a round capped master flogging a boy. It has been conjectured that this is a caricature of Copeland.
