= Copland (surname) =

Copland is a surname. It is sometimes the anglicized form of the Yiddish surname Kaplan. Notable people with the surname include:

- Aaron Copland (1900–1990), American composer
- Calaigh Copland (born 1987), Canadian-born Ghanaian footballer
- David Copland (1842 – 1920) Scottish-born Australian politician
- Denise Copland (born 1952), New Zealand artist
- Douglas Copland (1894 – 1971), Australian academic & economist
- Ernie Copland (1924–1971), Scottish footballer
- Geoffrey Malcolm Copland (active 1992–2007), British physicist & vice-chancellor
- Henry Copland (c. 1710–1754), British furniture designer and ornamentalist
- Jackie Copland (born 1947), Scottish footballer
- James Copland (1834–1902), New Zealand Presbyterian minister
- John de Coupland, also John Copland (died 1363), a knight
- Kay Copland (active 2010), Scottish sport shooter
- Marc Copland (born 1948), American jazz pianist and saxophonist
- Patrick Copland (1749–1822) joint founder of the Royal Society of Edinburgh
- Robert Copland (15th century–16th century), English printer and author
- Robert Copland-Crawford (1852–1894), soldier and amateur sportsperson
- William Copland (died 1569), English printer
- William Robertson Copland (1838–1907) Scottish civil engineer

== Also ==
- Lawson Lysnar Copland Field (1896–1981), New Zealand farmer
- Mab Copland Lineman, (1892–1957), Scottish-born US lawyer
- Clifford Copland Paterson (1879–1948), English scientist & electrical engineer
- Walter Copland Perry (1814–1911), British author & lawyer
