= David Copeland (disambiguation) =

David Copeland (born 1976) is the convicted perpetrator of the 1999 London nail bombings.

David Copeland may also refer to:

- David Copeland (footballer) (1875–1931), Scottish footballer
- David Y. Copeland III (1931–2019), American politician
- David Copeland (bowls) (born 1980), Irish lawn bowler
