= Roby Lakatos =

Hungarian jazz violinist (born 1965)

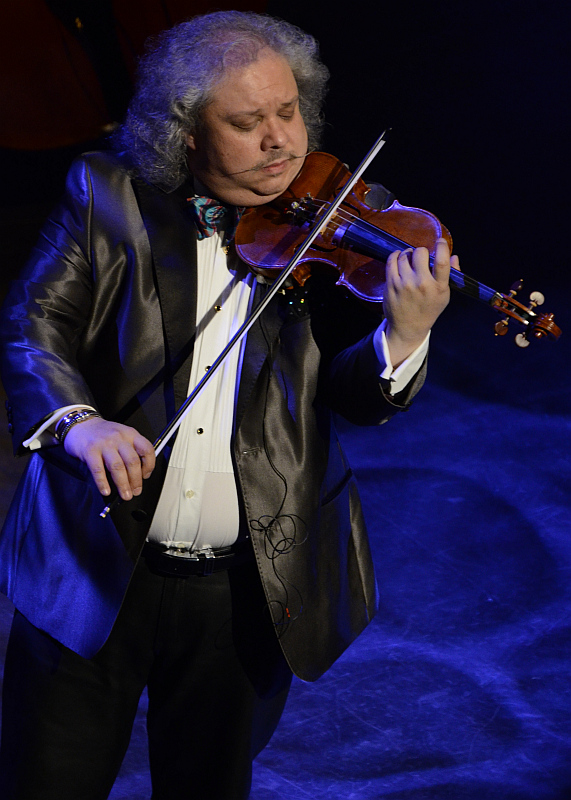

Background information
- Born: 1965 (age 60–61); Budapest, Hungary
- Genres: Gypsy jazz, classical, klezmer
- Occupation: Musician
- Instrument: Violin
- Labels: Deutsche Grammophon, Avanticlassic
- Website: www.roby-lakatos.com

Roby Lakatos (born 1965) is a violinist from Hungary who combines jazz, classical, and Hungarian Romani music.

== Career ==
Lakatos was born in 1965 into a family of Romani violinists descended from János Bihari, a composer who influenced Brahms and Liszt. He was introduced to music as a child. When he was nine years old, he made his public debut as first violinist in a Romani band. In 1984 he won first prize for classical violin at the Béla Bartók Conservatory of Budapest.

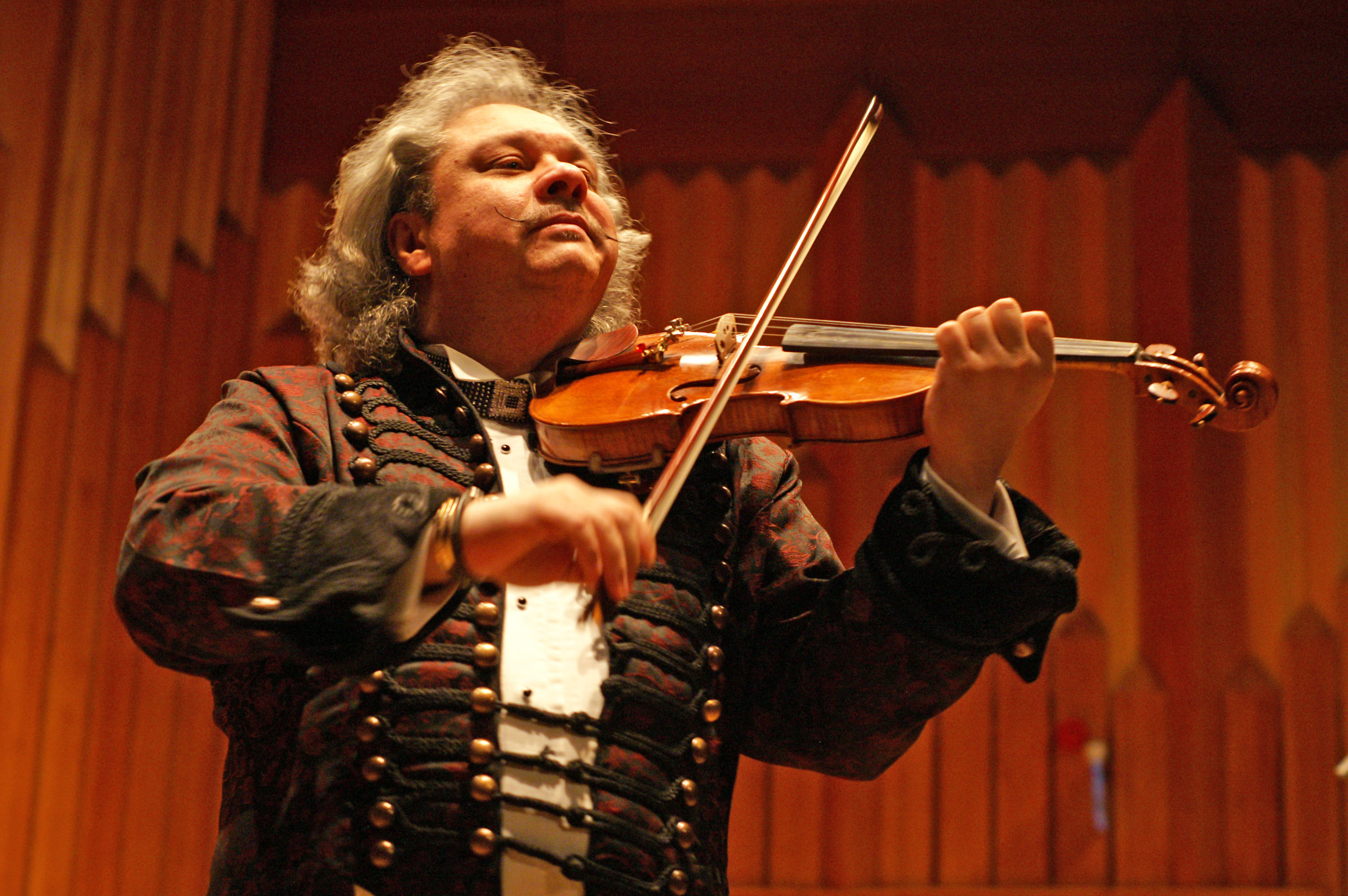
Lakatos during concert in 2013

For the next ten years, he led the house band at a Brussels restaurant where he was complimented by Yehudi Menuhin for his performance of a piece by Liszt. In March 2004, he appeared with the London Symphony Orchestra in the orchestra's Genius of the Violin festival with Maxim Vengerov.

Lakatos recorded a Prokofiev album with Polina Leschenko, Christian Poltéra, and Martha Argerich; Klezmer Karma with the Franz Liszt Chamber Orchestra, Yiddish singer Myriam Fuks, and accordionist Aldo Granato; Roby Lakatos with Musical Friends with Stéphane Grappelli, Vadim Repin, Randy Brecker, Tony Lakatos (his brother), Marc Fosset, and the Vieuxtemps Quartet.

== Discography ==
- 1991: In Gypsy Style
- 1998: Alouette König der Zigeunergeiger
- 1998: Lakatos
- 1999: Post Phrasing Lakatos Best
- 1999: Live from Budapest
- 2002: Kinoshita Meets Lakatos
- 2002: As Time Goes By (Deutsche Grammophon)
- 2004: The Legend of the Toad
- 2005: Fire Dance (Avanticlassic)
- 2006: Klezmer Karma (Avanticlassic)
- 2006: Rodrigo y Gabriela as guest
- 2008: Roby Lakatos with Musical Friends
- 2008: Boleritza as guest
- 2009: Gypsy Violin Virtuoso
- 2012: La Passion: Live at Sydney Opera House (Avanticlassic)
- 2015: Antonio Vivaldi: The Four Seasons (Avanticlassic)
