= Copeland Creek =

Copeland Creek may refer to:

- Copeland Creek (California), a stream in California
- Copeland Creek (Rogue River tributary), a stream in Oregon
