= Copeland, Virginia =

Unincorporated community in Virginia, US

Coordinates: 37°53′17″N 79°41′58″W

Copeland is an unincorporated community in Bath County, Virginia, United States.
