= Robert Copeland =

Robert Copeland may refer to:

- Robert Copeland (footballer) (born 1981), Australian Football League footballer
- Robert Copeland (theatre manager), early 19th-century theatre manager in Dover, England
- Robert S. Copeland (1800–1885), merchant, shipbuilder and political figure in Nova Scotia, Canada
- Robert W. Copeland (1910–1973), U.S. Navy officer
- Robert Morris Copeland (1830–1874), landscape architect, town planner and Union Army officer in the American Civil War

== See also ==
- Robert Copland (fl. 1508–1547), English printer and author
