= Edward Copeland =

English footballer

Personal information
- Date of birth: 19 May 1921
- Place of birth: Hetton-le-Hole, County Durham, England
- Date of death: 12 July 2001 (aged 80)
- Place of death: Durham, County Durham
- Position: Winger

Youth career
- 1937–1938: Easington Juniors

Senior career*
Years	Team	Apps	(Gls)
1938	Blackhall Colliery Welfare		
1938–1939	Hartlepool United	2	(0)
1939	Easington Colliery Welfare		
1939–1941	Newcastle United	20	(3)
1942–1943	Huddersfield Town		
1943–1944	Newcastle United		
1944–1948	Hartlepool United	81	(18)
1948–1950	Spennymoor United	11	(4)
- * Club domestic league appearances and goals

Edward "Ted" Copeland (19 May 1921 – 12 July 2001) was an English professional footballer who played for Newcastle United, Hartlepool United and Spennymoor United. Born in Hetton-le-Hole, County Durham. Copeland was a winger.

== Club career ==
Copeland played in the Wartime League for Newcastle United F.C. Originally signed in 1939 as an amateur, he played games throughout the war alongside United legends Jackie Milburn and Albert Stubbins.

Copeland signed as a Professional on 20 August 1943 and received roughly £2 a month. Prior to the season beginning, he was part of Jackie Milburn's first appearance, trialists ('The Stripes') played against a Newcastle United First XI featuring Albert Stubbins and Jimmy Gordon ('The Blues').

Copelands first game for Newcastle United came as they took on Bradford Park Avenue A.F.C. and they went on to win the game 2–1, in front of a crowd of 10,000. He scored his first and second goals away to Gateshead on 18 December 1943, in the Football League North First Championship. His third goal came on 5 February at Middlesbrough in a 2–1 loss in the Football League North/War Cup Qualifying. He appeared in 4 Tyne-Wear derby games. Copeland played an overall 20 games as Newcastles number 7, replaced the next season by Jackie Milburn.

Signed by Fred Westgarth again for Hartlepool United F.C. on a free transfer in 1944–45 for a second spell with the club, he played a total of 16 games scoring 3 goals. Two were scored in consecutive weeks, in wins versus York City F.C. and Darlington F.C. at Victoria Park, the latter away to Leeds United F.C. on 18 November.

Ted played in Hartlepools first post-war time game on 31 August 1946, they wore the Blue and White striped shirts and black shorts. Going on to draw with Barrow 1-1.

Copeland stayed on another two seasons for Pools until the 1947–1948 season appearing in a total of 81 games overall for Hartlepools scoring on 17 occasions, before moving to Spennymoor United. He was Hartlepools 7th highest war-time appearance maker and 10th highest goalscorer during these years.

Copelands photograph and pay packet are available to see in Newcastle United F.C.'s Milburn Entrance on a Stadium Tour at St. James' Park.

== Personal life ==
Copeland worked at Easington Colliery Pit as an Electrician.

Edward Copelands' son, Ted Copeland went on to manage the England women's national football team.

== Honours ==
=== Clubs ===
Blackhall Colliery Welfare

- Wearside Football League Winner (1): 1938–39 Wearside Football League

Spennymoor Town F.C.

- 1948-49 Northern Football League Winner (1)
