= Copland =

Copland or Cop Land may refer to:

- Copland (crater), on Mercury
- Copland (operating system)
- Copland (surname)
- Copland River in New Zealand
- 4532 Copland, an asteroid named after Aaron Copland
- Aaron Copland, American composer
- Cop Land, a 1997 movie starring Sylvester Stallone, Robert De Niro and Harvey Keitel

== See also ==
- Copeland (disambiguation)
