= Miles Copeland =

Miles Copeland may refer to:

- Miles Copeland Jr. (1916–1991), American musician, businessman, and CIA founder
- Miles Copeland III (born 1944), American entertainment executive
- Miles Copeland (Home and Away), a fictional character from soap opera Home and Away
