= Jim Copeland (American football) =

American football player and college athletics administrator (1945–2010)

No. 64
- Positions: Center, Guard

Personal information
- Born: March 5, 1945; Charlottesville, Virginia, U.S.
- Died: June 4, 2010 (aged 65); Charlottesville, Virginia, U.S.
- Listed height: 6 ft 3 in (1.91 m)
- Listed weight: 243 lb (110 kg)

Career information
- High school: Lane (Charlottesville)
- College: Virginia
- NFL draft: 1967: 10th round, 255th overall pick

Career history
- Cleveland Browns (1967–1974)

Career NFL statistics
- Games played: 81
- Games started: 9
- Stats at Pro Football Reference

Wyatt James Copeland Jr. (March 5, 1945 – June 4, 2010) was an American football player and college athletics administrator. He played as an offensive lineman for eight seasons in the National Football League (NFL). Copeland was born in Charlottesville, Virginia in 1945 and attended the University of Virginia. He was drafted in the tenth round by the Cleveland Browns in the 1967 NFL/AFL draft.

Copeland later served as the athletic director at the College of William & Mary, the University of Utah, the University of Virginia and Southern Methodist University (SMU).
