= J. William Copeland =

American politician and judge (1914–1988)

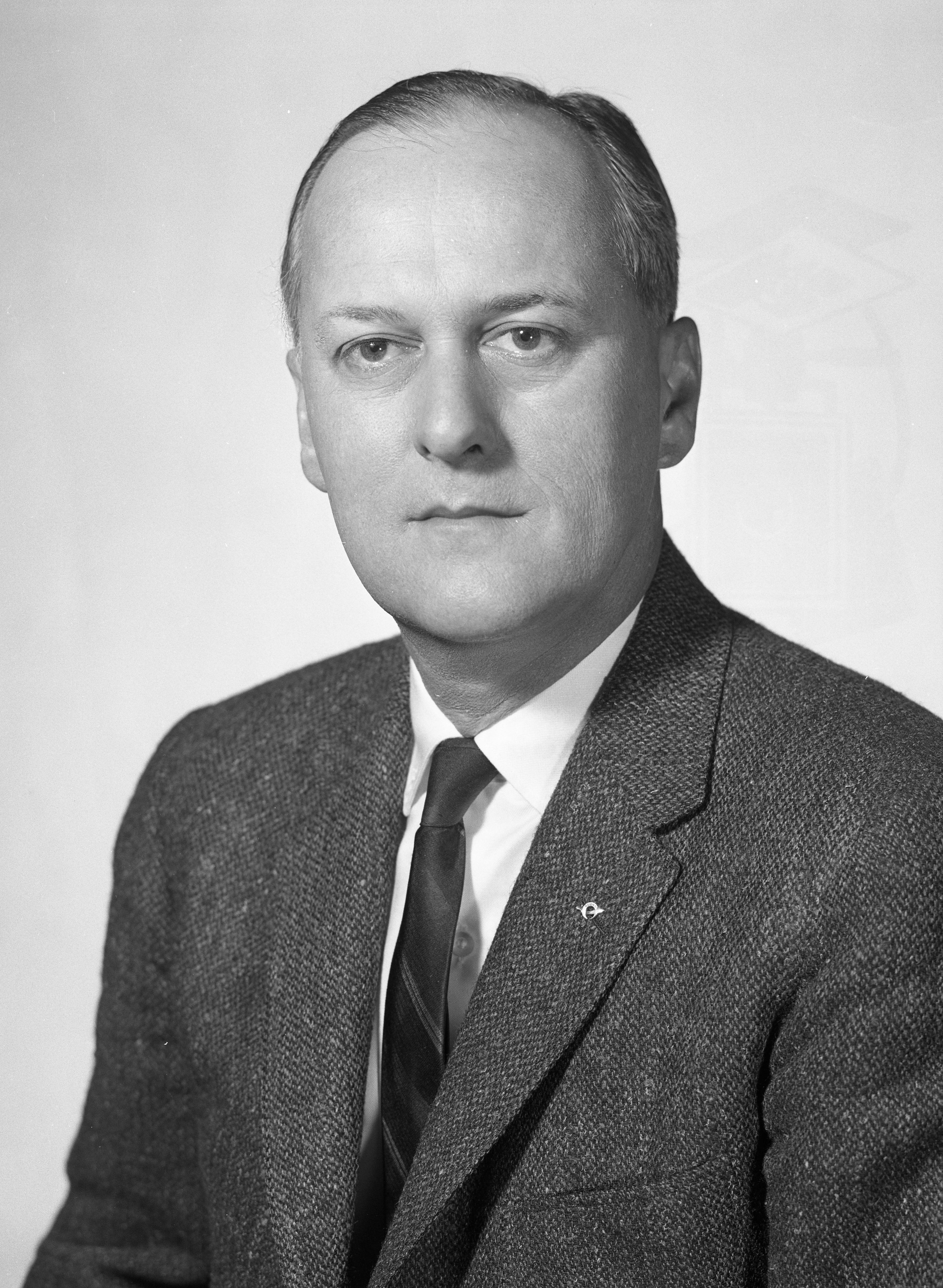
Copeland c. 1959

James William Copeland (June 16, 1914 – February 3, 1988) was an American politician and jurist who served in the North Carolina Senate representing the 1st District from 1949 to 1959 and as an associate justice of the North Carolina Supreme Court from 1975 to 1985.

== Early life ==
James William Copeland was born on June 16, 1914, in Woodland, North Carolina, to L. C. and Nora L. Bethall Copeland. He graduated from Woodland-Olney High School in 1930. He received a bachelor's degree from Guilford College in 1934 and a law degree from the University of North Carolina Law School in 1937. While at the latter school he served as the assistant editor of the North Carolina Law Review. He subsequently worked as a farmer and lawyer and served in the U.S. Navy at the rank of lieutenant from 1942 to 1946. He married Nancy Hall Sawyer on October 11, 1941 and had three children with her.

== Political career ==
Copeland was a member of the Democratic Party. He chaired the Northampton County Board of Elections from 1939 to 1942 and served as the mayor of Woodland from 1940 until 1942. He subsequently served as the mayor of Murfreesboro from 1947 to 1950 and chaired the Hertford County Board of Elections from 1946 to 1949. He managed the Hertford County branch of Alton Lennon's 1952 U.S. Senate campaign and served as a delegate at the 1956 Democratic National Convention.

Copeland served four terms in the North Carolina Senate, representing the 1st District. Being first elected in 1948, he served from 1949 to 1959. In the legislature, he gained a reputation as a conservative, opposing Governor Kerr Scott's road expansion program during the 1949 session and other efforts by the governor during the 1951 session. Narrowly reelected in 1956, he became a steady backer of Governor Luther H. Hodges in 1957, who eventually appointed Copeland to the State Advisory Budget Commission. During the 1959 legislative session, Copeland chaired the Senate Appropriations Committee, and in that capacity defended Hodges' proposed budget from legislators who wanted to increase public education spending.

During North Carolina's 1960 gubernatorial election, Copeland decided to back former state senator Terry Sanford. Though they supported different policies and ran in different ideological circles, the senator thought Sanford was pragmatic and a winning candidate. Sanford ultimately won the race and sought to enact a legislative program including major increases in spending on public education. Sanford had served with Copeland during the 1953 session and sparred with him on a budgetary matter, and figured he could be an influential and knowledgeable asset as the governor's legislative liaison. Sanford stunned his allies by appointing Copeland to the role for the 1961 legislative session, justifying his decision by arguing that Copeland could sway conservatives who would be hesitant to increase government spending.

== Judicial career ==
After the 1961 legislative session closed, the governor rewarded Copeland for his work by appointing him as a special judge on the North Carolina Superior Court. Taking office on July 5, he held court in 85 different counties and served on the bench until he was elected as an associate justice on the North Carolina Supreme Court in 1974. He served there until 1984.

== Later life ==
Copeland died on February 3, 1988, at a hospital in Ahoskie, North Carolina. A funeral was held two days later at the Murfreesboro United Methodist Church and he was buried in the Riverside Cemetery.

== Works cited ==
- Covington, Howard E. Jr; Ellis, Marion A. (1999). Terry Sanford: Politics, Progress, and Outrageous Ambitions. Durham: Duke University Press. ISBN 9780822323563.
- North Carolina Manual. Raleigh: North Carolina Department of the Secretary of State. 1953. OCLC 2623953.

Political offices
Preceded by William H. Bobbitt	Justice of the North Carolina Supreme Court; 1975–1985	Succeeded by Earl W. Vaughn
