= Huron Plaza =

Residential skyscraper in Chicago, Illinois

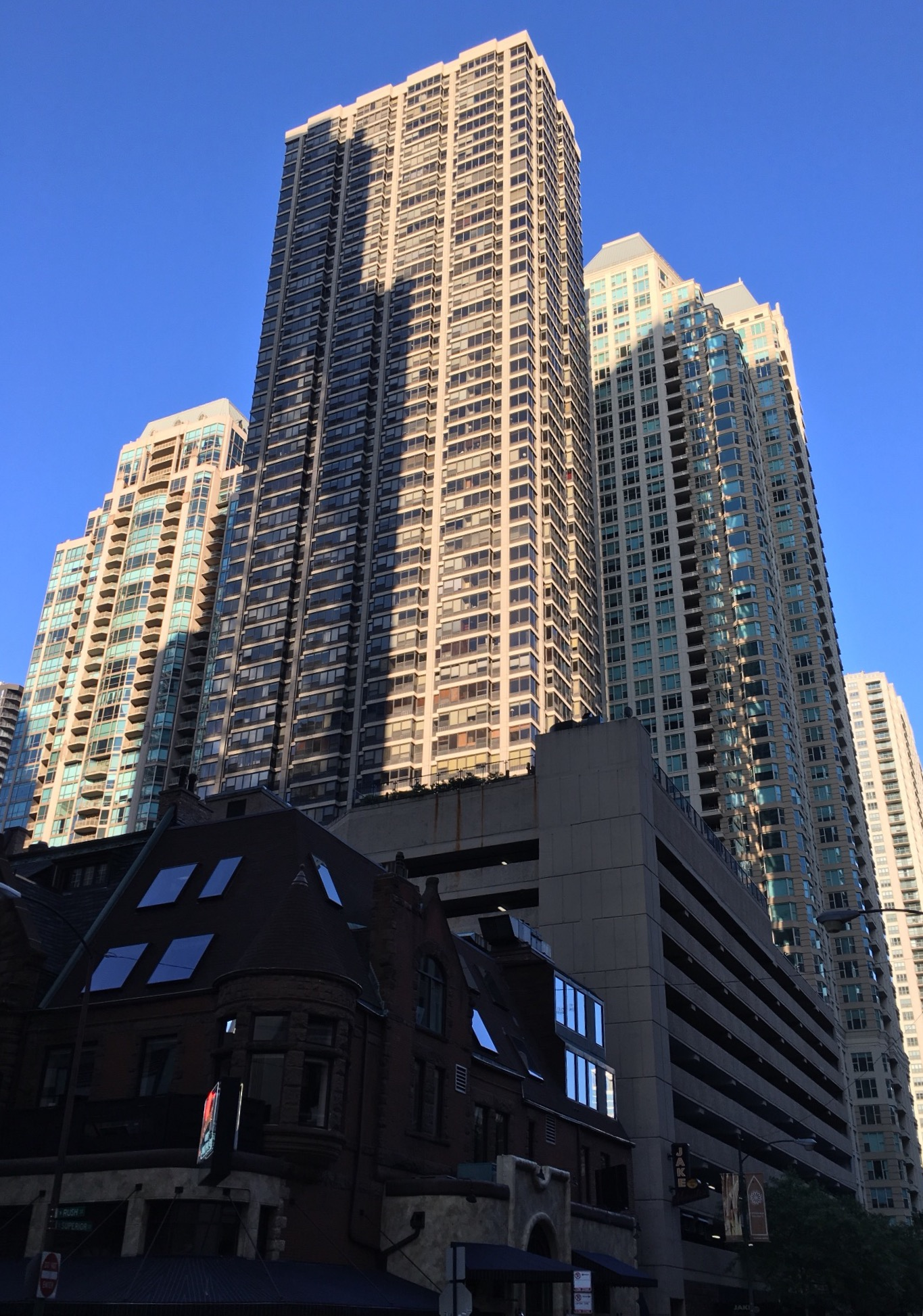
- Interactive map of the Huron Plaza area

General information
- Type: Residential
- Location: 30 East Huron Street, Chicago, Illinois
- Coordinates: 41.8952°N 87.6266°W
- Completed: 1983

Height
- Roof: 560 ft (170 m)

Technical details
- Floor count: 56
- Floor area: 47,384 m^{2} (510,040 sq ft)

Design and construction
- Architects: Gordon and Levin

Huron Plaza is a 560-foot-tall (170 m) tall skyscraper in Chicago, Illinois. It was completed in 1983 and has 56 floors. Gordon and Levin designed the building, which is the 51st tallest in Chicago. It was the first residential high rise in the Near North Side's Cathedral District.

== See also ==
- List of tallest buildings in Chicago
