= 400 East Ohio Street =

Skyscraper in Chicago, Illinois

- Interactive map of the 400 East Ohio Street area

General information
- Type: Residential
- Location: 400 East Ohio Street; Chicago, Illinois
- Coordinates: 41°53′34.5″N 87°37′4.5″W
- Completed: 1983

Height
- Roof: 505 ft (154 m)

Technical details
- Floor count: 50

Design and construction
- Architects: Gordon & Levin

400 East Ohio Street (originally called Streeterville 400 and later The Bancroft) is a 505 ft (154 m) tall skyscraper in Chicago, Illinois. It was completed in 1983 and has 50 floors. Gordon & Levin designed the building, which is the 85th tallest in Chicago.

== See also ==
- List of tallest buildings in Chicago
