= List of tallest buildings in Chicago =

Skyline of Chicago
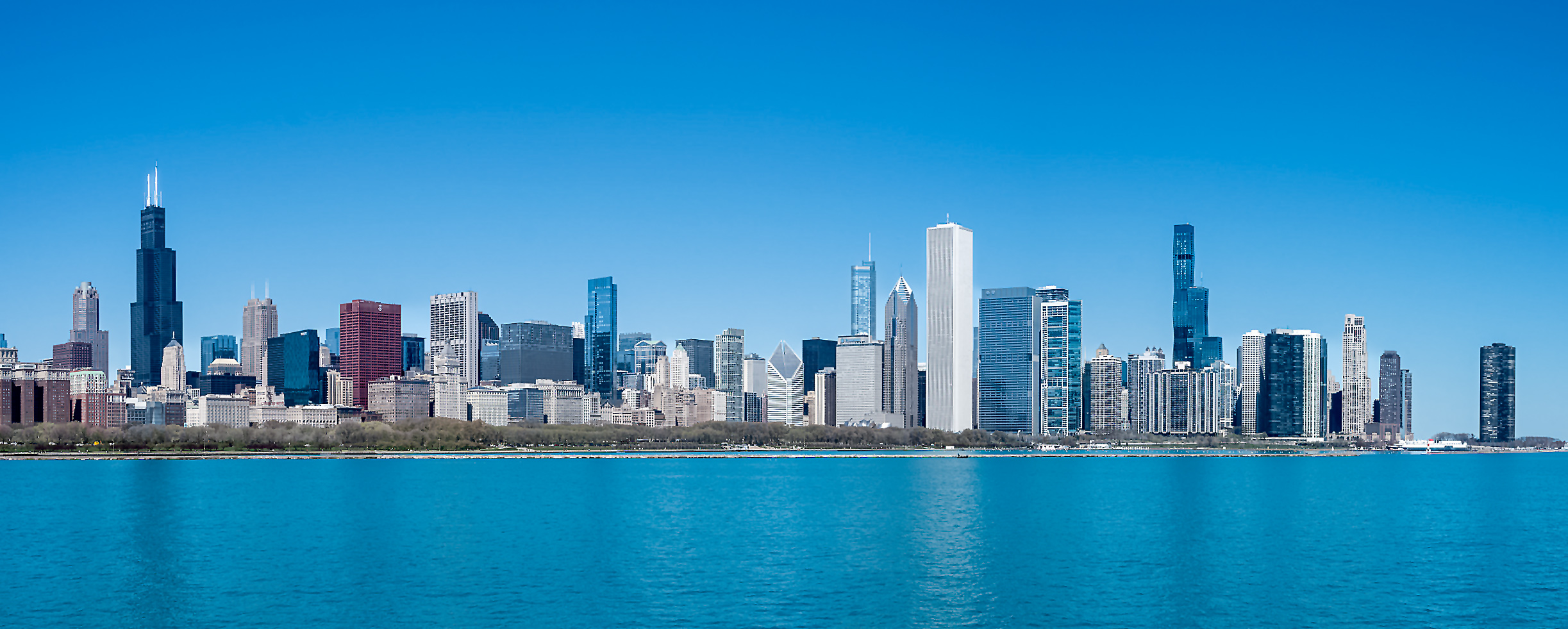
- Chicago skyline in 2024 on the shores of Lake Michigan
- Tallest building: Willis Tower (1974)
- Tallest building height: 1,451 feet (442 m)
- First 150 m+ building: Chicago Temple Building (1924)

Number of tall buildings (2026)
- Taller than 100 m (328 ft): 356
- Taller than 150 m (492 ft): 137 + 1 T/O (Note: Topped-out)
- Taller than 200 m (656 ft): 38 + 1 T/O
- Taller than 300 m (984 ft): 7
- Taller than 400 m (1,312 ft): 2

Number of tall buildings — feet
- Taller than 300 ft (91.4 m): 409

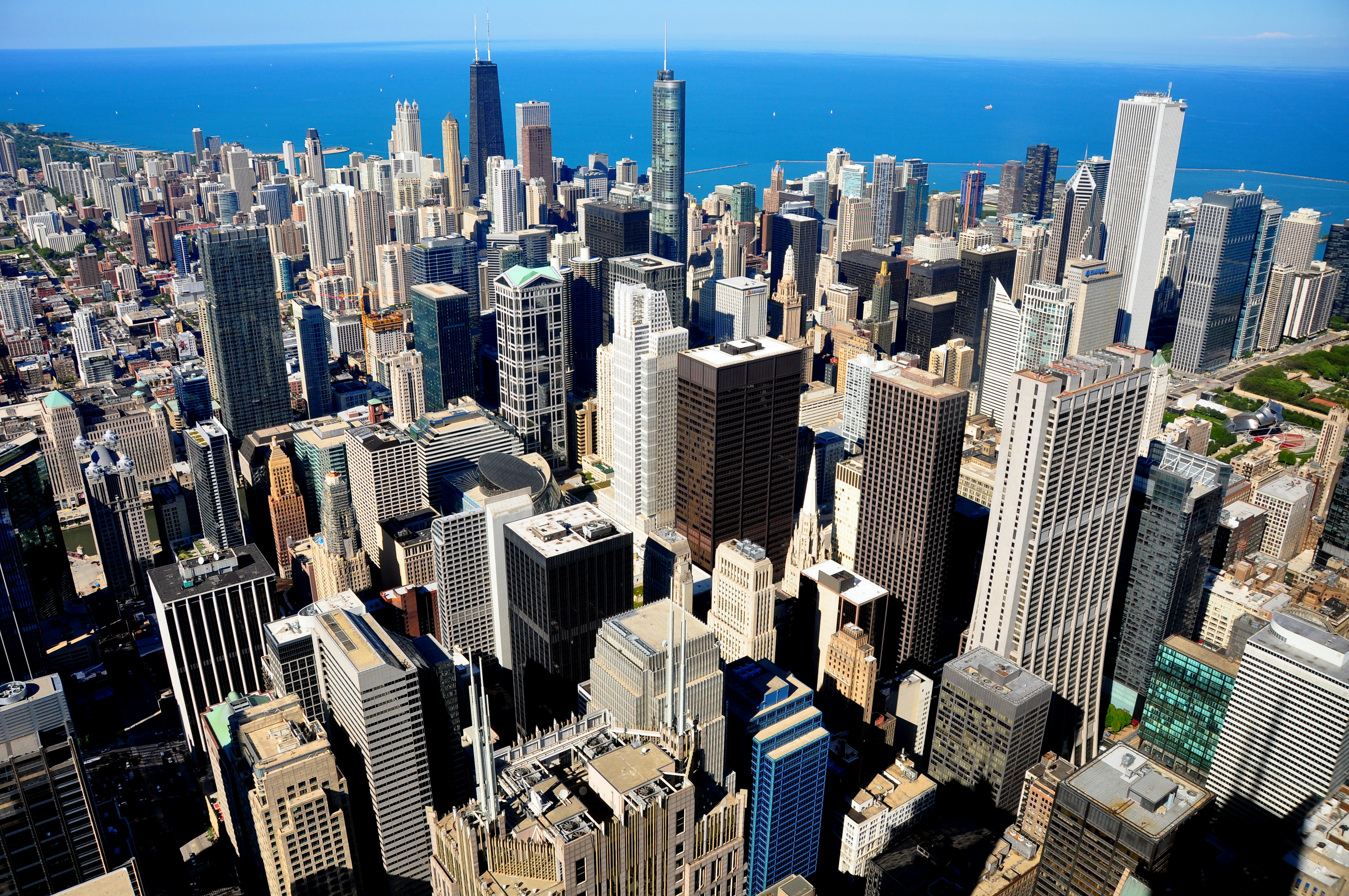
A plethora of towers in downtown Chicago, looking northeast towards Lake Michigan

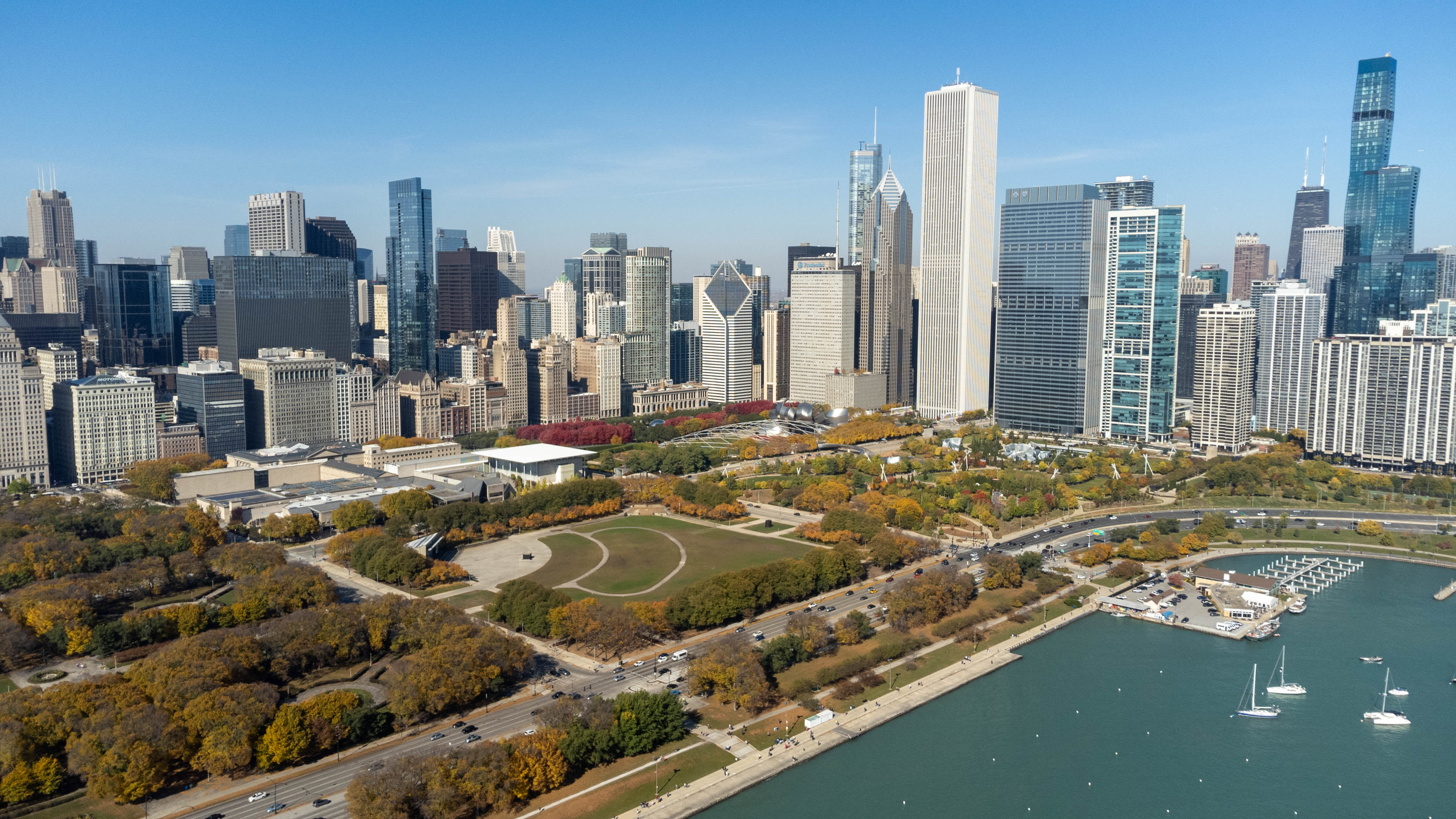
Skyscrapers overlooking Millennium Park and Grant Park in 2022

Chicago is the third-largest city in the United States, with a metropolitan area of over 9 million people. It is home to over 1,250 completed high-rises, 137 of which stand taller than 492 feet (150 m) as of 2026. The birthplace of the skyscraper, Chicago has always played a prominent role in their development, and its skyline spans the full history of skyscraper construction. The tallest building in the city is the 110-story Willis Tower (also known as the Sears Tower), which rises 1,451 feet (442 m) in the Chicago Loop and was completed in 1974. Of the fifteen tallest buildings in the United States, five are in Chicago. Chicago's skyline is the second largest in the United States, in North America, and in the Western Hemisphere, after New York City.

The Home Insurance Building, completed in 1885, is regarded as the world's first skyscraper. This building used the steel-frame method, innovated in Chicago; it was originally built with 10 stories, and later expanded to 12, to a height of 180 feet (55 m), an enormous height for the 19th century. Being the inventor of the skyscraper, Chicago went through a series of early high-rise construction booms that lasted from the 1880s to the mid-1930s, during which nine of the city's 100 tallest buildings were completed. Chicago and New York City were the only cities in the world with large, high-rise skylines during the first half of the 20th century. Chicago then went through an even larger building boom that lasted from the early 1960s to the early 1990s, in which many notable commercial skyscrapers were built, such as the city's fourth-tallest building, the Aon Center, its fifth tallest, 875 North Michigan Avenue (originally known as the John Hancock Center), and Willis Tower, which was the tallest building in the world upon its completion until 1993, and the tallest in the United States until 2013. For most of the 20th century until the 1990s, Chicago had the second largest skyline in the world.

A third boom began in the 2000s, which saw the completion of the city's second tallest building, the Trump International Hotel & Tower, and its third tallest, St Regis Chicago, the tallest structure designed by a woman. Chicago leads the nation in the twenty tallest women-designed towers in the world, thanks to contributions by Jeanne Gang and Natalie de Blois. The skyline has expanded into the South Loop with skyscrapers such as NEMA Chicago and One Museum Park, as well as westwards into the West Loop and Fulton Market areas. Wolf Point is home to a number of new developments such as Salesforce Tower Chicago. Other notable new skyscrapers include 110 North Wacker (2020), One Chicago Square (2022), and 1000M (2024). The tallest building under construction is 400 Lake Shore, built on the site of the cancelled Chicago Spire project; it scheduled to be completed by 2027.

The tallest buildings in Chicago are concentrated in the downtown areas of the Loop, Streeterville, River North, the South Loop, and the West Loop. Other high-rises extend north along the waterfront into North Side districts such as the Gold Coast, Lincoln Park, Lakeview, Uptown and Edgewater, bounded by Lake Michigan to the east. Some high-rises also extend south from downtown along the waterfront to South Side districts such as Kenwood, Hyde Park, and South Shore, ultimately forming a contiguous area of high-rises that is among the largest in the United States. Chicago's skyline is a cultural icon of the city, and has appeared in a variety of films and popular media.

== History ==
Number of buildings by height in Chicago by the end of each year, including any demolished buildings. Click on the legend to toggle a specific height on or off. View chart definition.

=== First skyscrapers ===
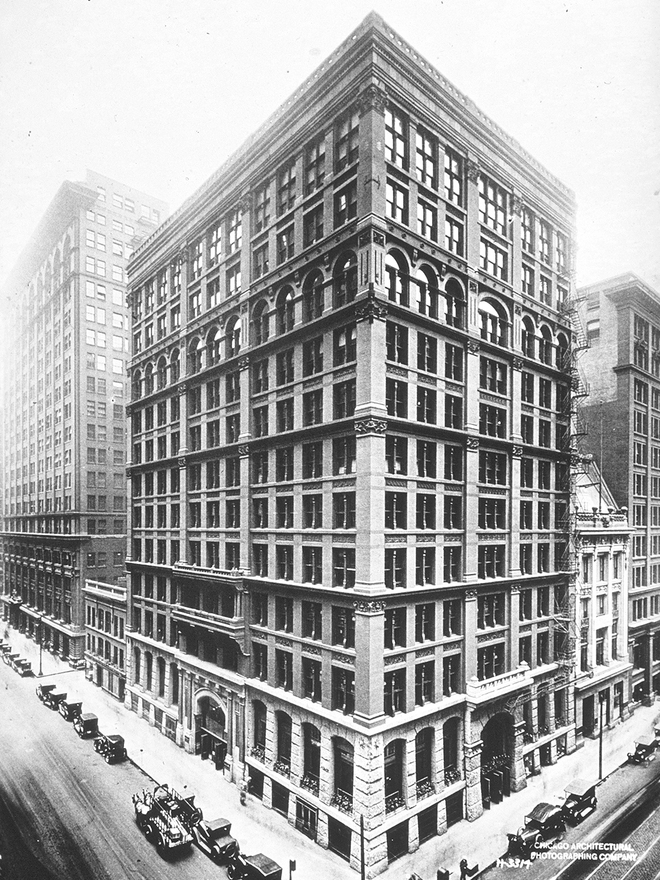
The Home Insurance building is considered to be the world's first skyscraper.

Towards the second half of the 19th century, Chicago grew to become the second-largest city in the United States as a railroad and trading hub. After the Great Chicago Fire destroyed most of the wooden structures in the city in 1871, Chicago was rebuilt on large plots of land in a grid network and followed new city ordinances that prohibited wooden construction. These factors encouraged the construction of taller buildings in Chicago. New technologies such as the development of the elevator and in heating, lighting, and ventilation made taller buildings more viable.

The first skyscraper in the world is considered to be the 10-story Home Insurance Building, built in 1885, due to its use of structural steel in a metal frame design. The building was designed by William Le Baron Jenney, who had been trained as an engineer in France and was a leading architect in Chicago. The design was innovative, incorporating structural steel into the building's internal metal frame alongside the traditional wrought iron. This frame took the weight of the floors of the building, and in addition, helped to support the weight of the external walls, proving an important step towards creating the genuine non-structural curtain walls that became a feature of later skyscrapers.

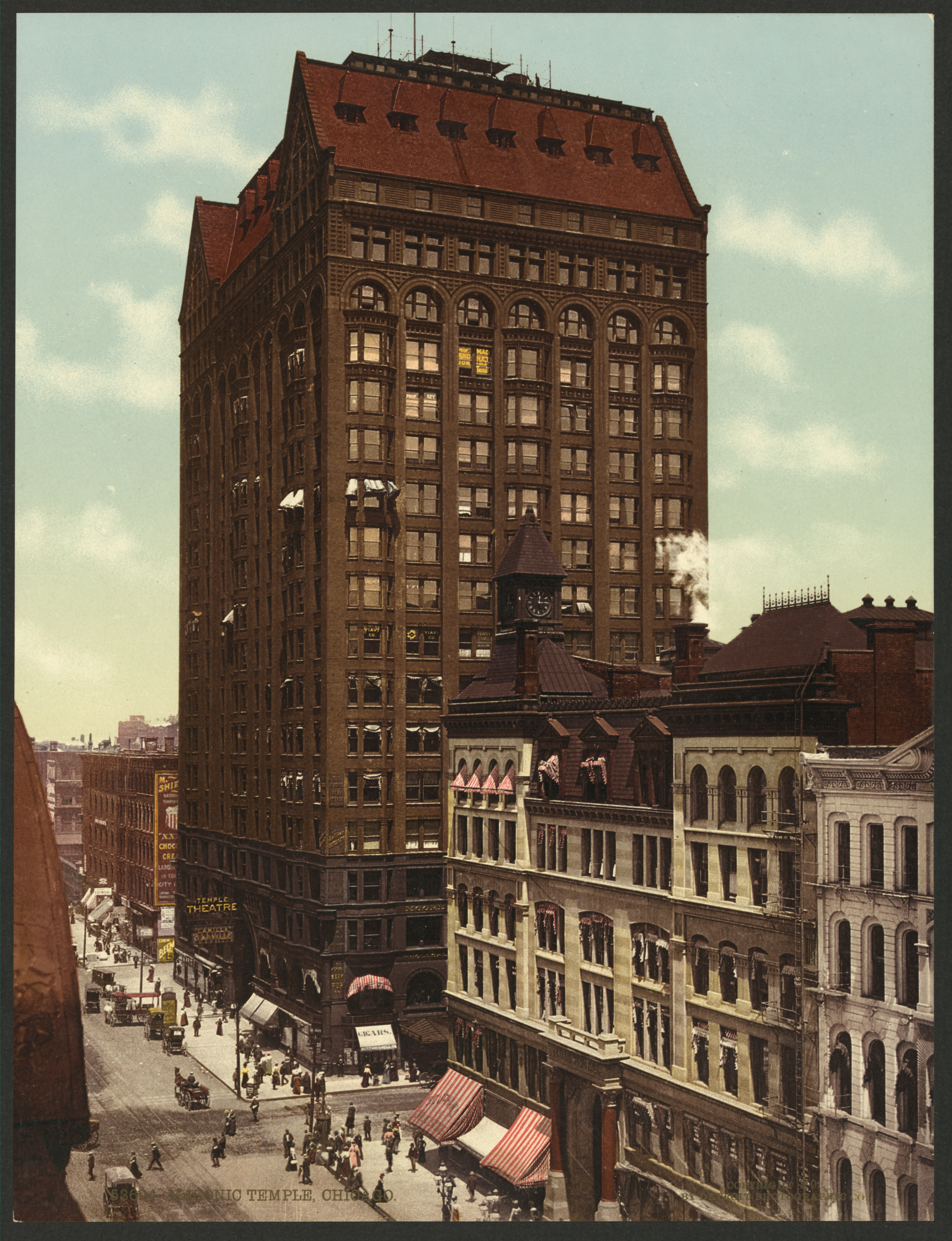
The Masonic Temple building housed meeting rooms for the Freemasons on its upper floors.

These innovations caught on quickly in Chicago, as the city's earliest high-rises followed suit. Among the world's first high-rise boom occurred in Chicago from 1888 onwards, and by 1893, Chicago had built 12 skyscrapers between 16 and 20 stories tall, tightly clustered in the center of the financial district. These include the Tacoma Building, The Rookery, Monadnock Building, and the Rand McNally Building, which was the world's first all-steel framed skyscraper. Structural engineers specializing in the steel frame design began to establish practices in Chicago.

One of the tallest buildings completed during this boom was the Masonic Temple, built by the Freemasons at a time when they were a fast-growing community in the city. The Freemasons competed with a local rival, the Odd Fellows, who intended to build a much higher skyscraper, 556 feet (169 m) tall, that would have been the tallest building in the world, which was never built. Until the turn of the 20th century, Chicago led New York City in high-rise construction. It was not until 1895 when New York City would surpass Chicago in the height of its high-rises, with the American Surety Building. In 1892, owing to the oversupply of office space, Chicago limited the construction of high-rises to under 150 feet (46 meters). By the 1890s, a distinct architectural style emerged from Chicago, named the Chicago school. This style involved placing rich, ornate designs on the outside of skyscrapers at the ground level and simpler, plainer ornamentation on the upper levels, with strong vertical lines.

=== 1900s–1930s ===
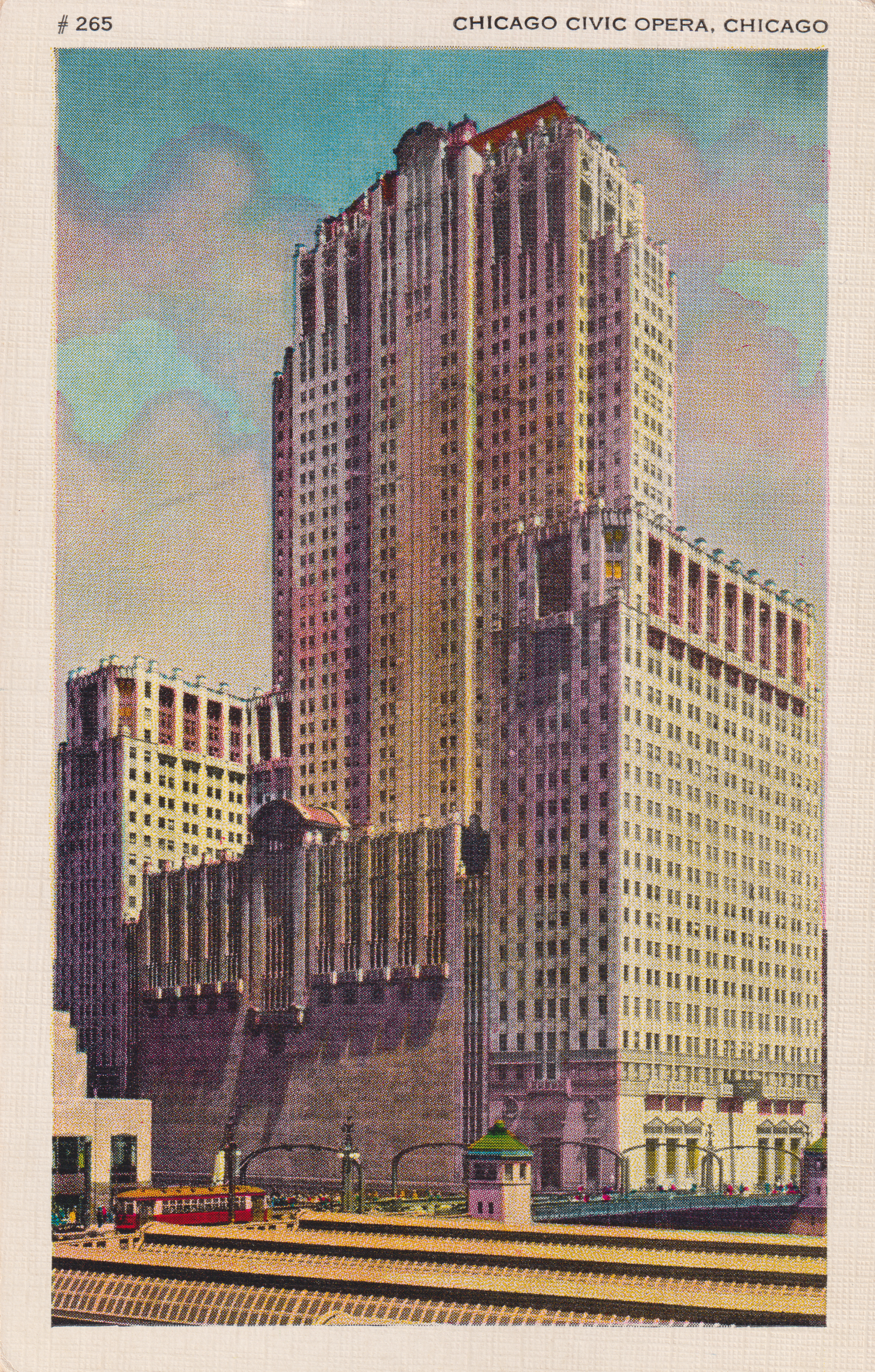
A postcard of the then newly built Civic Opera Building in 1929

Chicago's construction boom continued into the early 20th century, up until the mid-1910s when World War I began. The city's elevated train network opened by 1910, making it easier for more workers to come downtown. By the end of the 1910s, Chicago had the second largest number of headquarters in the United States. Local architectural firms such as Daniel H. Burnham and then Graham, Anderson, Probst & White continued to design skyscrapers in the Chicago style popularized in the previous decade. The Masonic Temple Building was overtake in height by the Montgomery Ward Building in 1899. The building served as the headquarters for Montgomery Ward, the United States' oldest mail order firm.

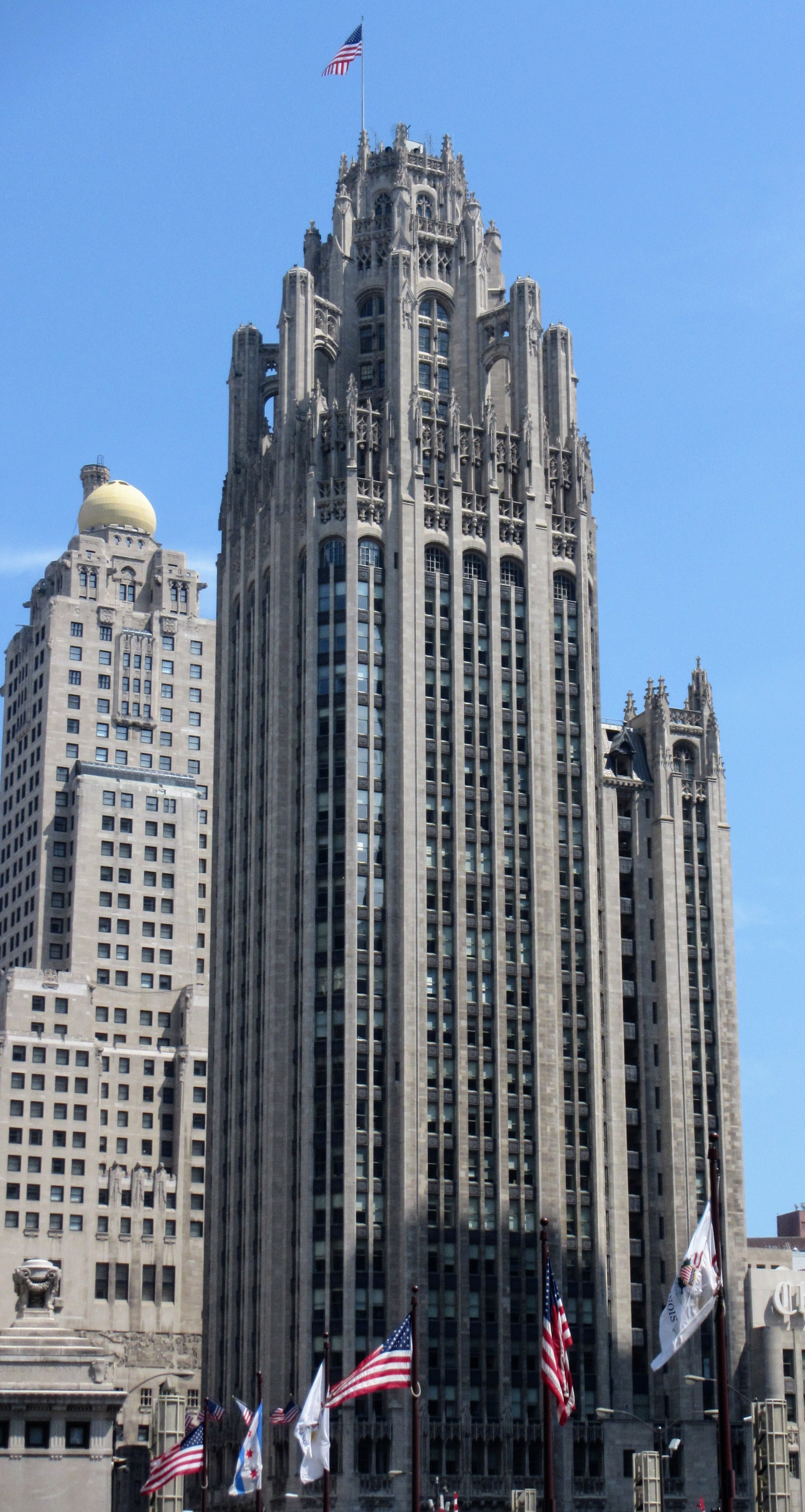
The Tribune Tower features a notable design inspired by neo-Gothic architecture

Following a pause in development during World War I, a larger construction boom took place in the 1920s until the early 1930s. Limited wartime construction created supply shortages in the city, and rent levels rose in response by around 100 percent between 1919 and 1924. This level of potential profits encouraged an explosion of new building projects in the city. The 1892 height limit was relaxed in 1920 to 260 feet (79 m), and in 1923, Chicago passed its first comprehensive zoning ordinance, permitting taller towers, but with more controls on overall volumes.

One of the first new skyscrapers of this boom was the Wrigley Building, which was Chicago's tallest building from 1922 to 1924. It was the first major office building north of the Chicago River. In 1924, the Wrigley Building was surpassed in height by the first skyscraper in Chicago to exceed 150 metres (490 ft), the Chicago Temple Building. Besides as an office, the Chicago Temple Building was also used as the congregation of the First United Methodist Church of Chicago. The Morrison Hotel became the tallest hotel building in the world when it was built in 1925. The tower is an expansion to the existing Morrison's hotel, and it was the first building outside of New York City to have over 40 stories. Significant additions include the Pittsfield Building (1927), the Carbide & Carbon Building (1928), and the Palmolive Building (1929), all incorporating architectural features of the Art Deco style. Another mixed-use building was the Civic Opera Building, which in addition to office space, housed a 3,563-seat opera house, which serves as the permanent home of the Lyric Opera of Chicago.

While shorter than the aforementioned buildings, the Tribune Tower is one of this period's most famous skyscrapers. The tower emerged from a design competition held by the Tribune Company in 1922 to celebrate its 75th anniversary. The Tribune newspaper, one of the largest in the world at the time, used the competition to build a loyal following amongst its readership and generate free publicity. The final design was decided by competition panel mainly made up of the company's appointees, who chose John Howells and Raymond Hood's design. The resulting tower was a conservative Gothic design; controversy about the decision broke out almost immediately. Architect Louis Sullivan criticized the chosen design as being derivative of the Woolworth Tower. Regardless of its critics, the Tribune received as many as 20,000 visitors to its observation gallery when it opened in 1925. The unbuilt second-place entry in the competition, a more simplified stepped-back design by Eliel Saarinen, also proved highly influential.

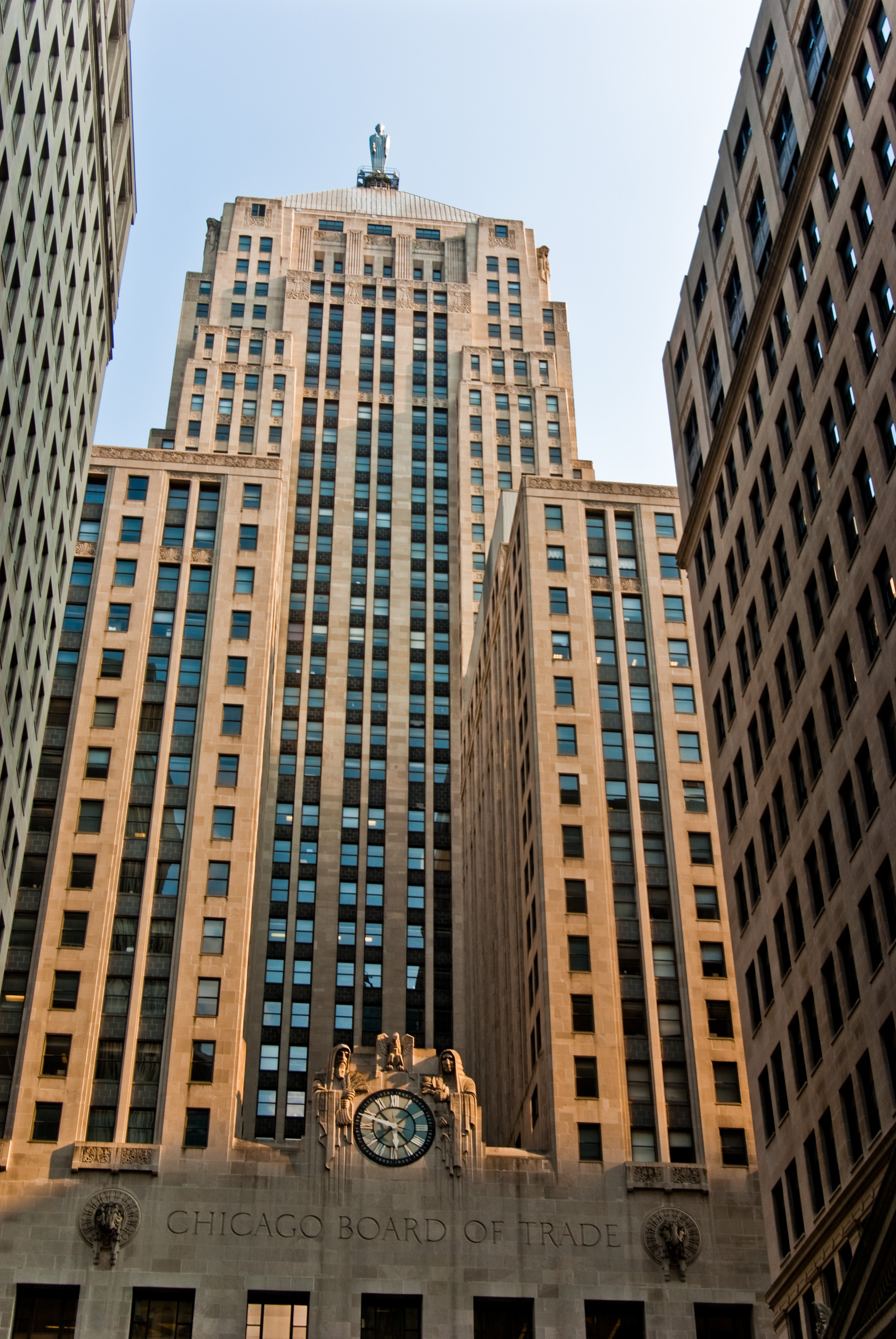
The Chicago Board of Trade building remained Chicago's tallest for over 30 years

In 1930, the Chicago Board of Trade Building was completed, replacing an earlier high-rise designed by William W. Boyington as the site for the Chicago Board of Trade (CBOT). The skyscraper is known for its Art Deco architecture, sculptures, large-scale stone carving, and its large trading floors. The CBOT has operated in the building continuously since. In the same year, a notable high-rise, was opened; with 4 million square feet (372,000 m^{2}) of floor space, the 25-story Merchandise Mart, wider than it was tall, was the largest building in the world by volume. Due to the Great Depression, the skyscraper boom came to an end in the early 1930s. The Home Insurance Building was demolished in 1931 to make way for the Field Building, which was completed in 1934; the Field Building is the last major building to be added before a hiatus in skyscraper construction over the next twenty years.

=== 1940s–1950s ===
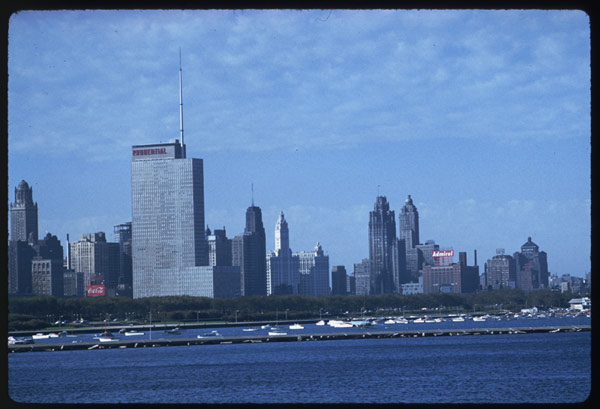
Chicago's skyline in 1958, prominently showing the Prudential Building

After the completion of the Field Building, very few high-rises were built in Chicago until the mid-1950s, leaving its skyline mostly unchanged for two decades. The tallest building completed in the 1940s were the Promontory Apartments, the first skyscraper designed by famous German-American architect Ludwig Mies van der Rohe. It was a cooperative housing tower in Hyde Park with an exposed skeleton. The building and its display at the Museum of Modern Art led Mies to be commissioned for the Seagram Building in New York City.

In 1942, work finished at Cabrini–Green homes, a public housing project on the city's Near North Side. The project one of the first large-scale public housing projects in the United States, consisting of high-rise and mid-rise tower blocks. Extensions to the estate occurred in 1957 and 1962. Over the following decades, the development became associated with high-crime rates and building deterioration; "Cabrini–Green" became a metonym for problems associated with public housing in the United States.

The lull in skyscraper development was broken by the Prudential Building in 1955, which at a height of 601 feet (183 m) became the city's second tallest building. It was followed by the Inland Steel Building in 1958. The Inland Steel Building is seen as defining high-rises for the post-war era of modern architecture.

=== 1960s–1970s ===
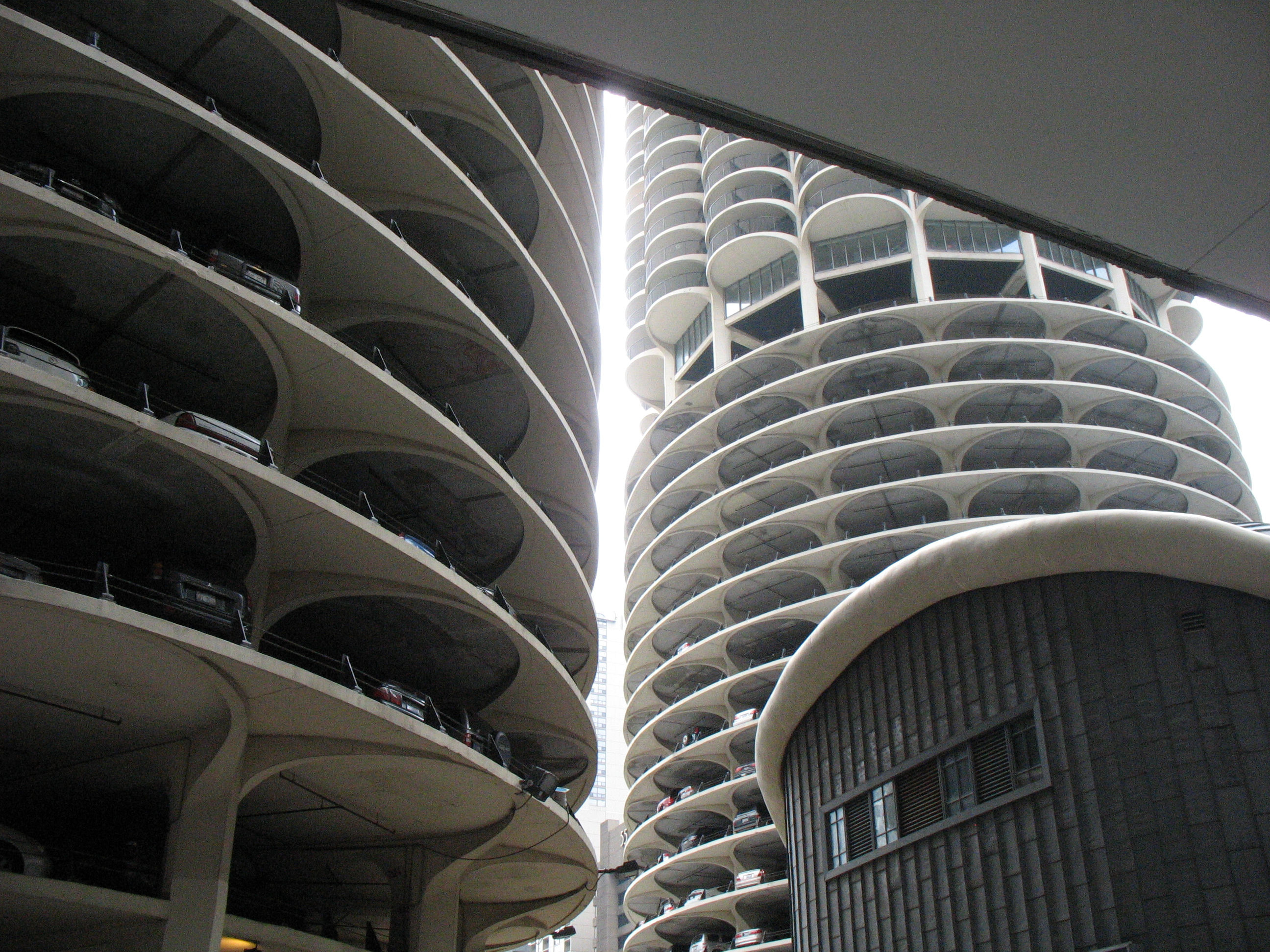
The circular features of the Marina Center towers

Skyscraper development would return fully in the 1960s, as Chicago entered a third, larger building boom that shaped its current skyline. The city more readily embraced residential skyscrapers compared to other American cities, and apartment towers spread north and south from the Loop along Lake Michigan. At the same time, Chicago was also experiencing white flight, which was leading to a decline of the city's population. To combat this, the Service Employees International Union, a union of building janitors and elevator operators, financed the construction of the 588 feet (179 m) Marina City complex, which was completed in 1964. The twin cylindrical skyscrapers of Marina City sit on the Chicago River, and are known for their unique design that resembles corncobs. The complex's apartments contain almost no interior right angles, with a circular hallway surrounding the elevator core. An even taller residential building, Lake Point Tower, was built in 1968 at 645 feet (197 m) tall. Located adjacent to Navy Pier, it is the easternmost skyscraper in the downtown skyline, and was the tallest apartment building in the world at the time. The tower has a triangular core and three arms that form a 'Y'-shape. Two residential towers that surpassed 500 feet (152 m) were built far outside The Loop in the 1970s: Park Place Tower and Park Tower Condominiums.

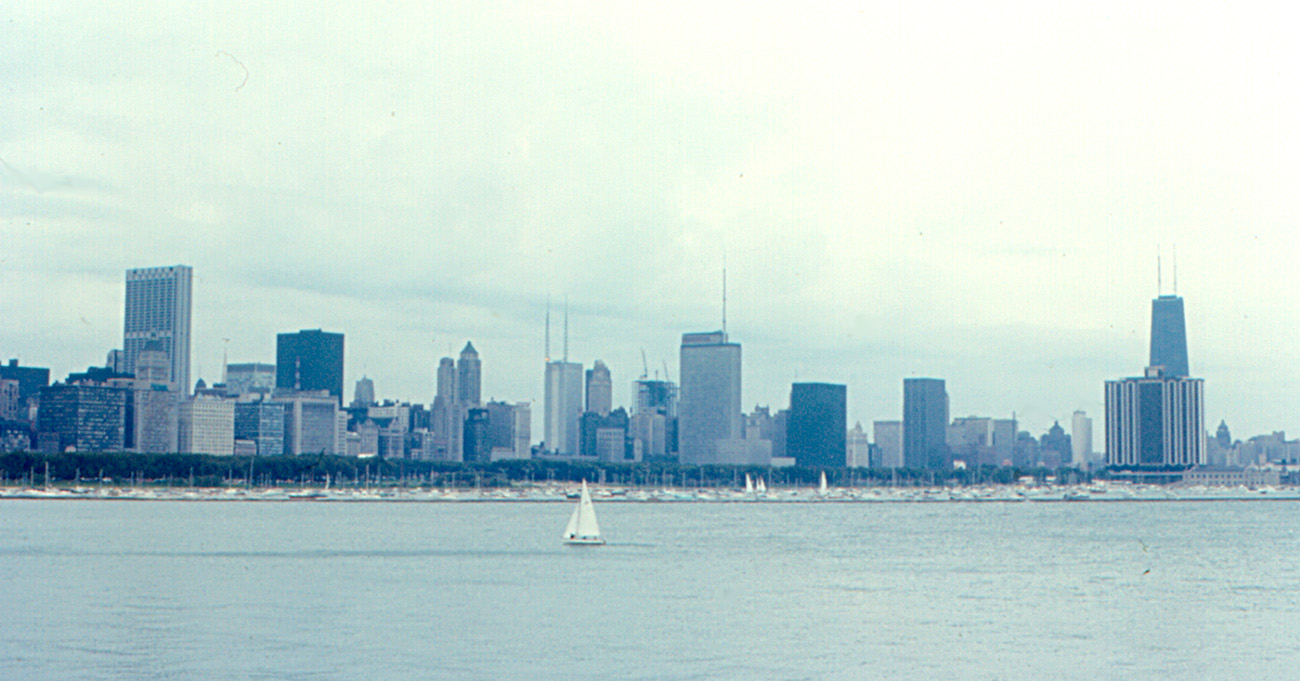
Chicago's skyline in 1970, dominated by the John Hancock Center

The Chicago Board of Trade Building would finally be overtaken in height by the modernist Chicago Civic Center in 1965, later renamed the Richard J. Daley Center by then-Chicago mayor Richard J. Daley. It is Chicago's main civic center; the 648 ft (198 m) tower houses offices and courtrooms for the Cook County Circuit Courts, Cook County State's Attorney and additional office space for the city government and Cook County. As building heights increased for Chicago's commercial developments, the title of the city's tallest building would be broken four more times from 1969 to 1974. The Morrison Hotel was demolished in 1965, making it the tallest building ever demolished at the time. In its place, One First National Plaza (now Chase Tower) was built in 1969, very briefly becoming Chicago's tallest building. Chase Tower is known for its distinctive curving shape and its vibrant public space, with a ceramic wall mural by Marc Chagall.

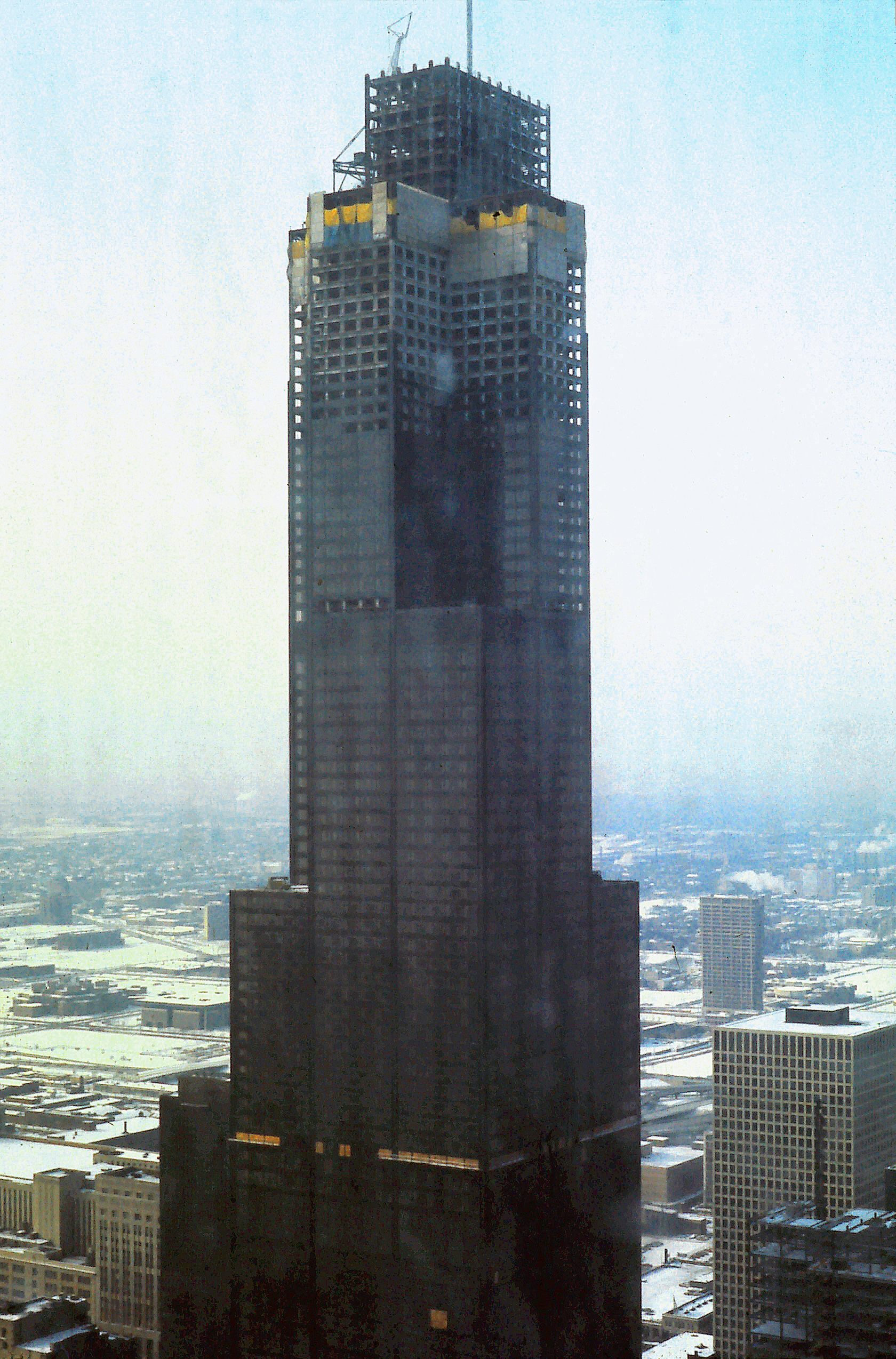
The Sears Tower under construction

Of Chicago's five tallest buildings, three were completed within a 5-year span between 1969 and 1974. 875 North Michigan Avenue, completed in 1969 as the John Hancock Center, was the first supertall skyscraper in Chicago, supplanting Chase Tower as the city's tallest building. The building has a structural expressionist style, with a distinctive X-braced exterior. this tubular system was an innovation that allowed the John Hancock Center to achieve its record height of 1,127 feet (344 m). The taller of the building's two large antennas extends its height to 1,500 feet (457 m). The tube system in the John Hancock Center, and later in Sears Tower, was implemented by Bangladeshi-American structural engineer Fazlur Rahman Khan. The Standard Oil Building, later renamed the Aon Center, was completed in 1973 as the headquarters for the Standard Oil Company of Indiana, which became Amoco. It was very slightly taller than the John Hancock Center, at 1,136 feet (346 m); its pinstripes and white marble-clad exterior on a rectangular profile was a prominent feature on the skyline, although the marble was replaced by granite in the early 1990s.

Sears, a department store chain headquartered in Chicago, had grown to become the largest retailer in the world by the 1960s. Requiring more office space, the company decided against relocating to the suburbs, opting instead to build a new skyscraper on the western end of the Loop. The new skyscraper was designed by Skidmore, Owings & Merrill, with its planned height growing with Sears' growth projections. Plans for what would become the Sears Tower were announced in 1970, and construction began in the same year. During construction, Sears Tower met lawsuits as Chicagoland residents and broadcasters raised concerns that the skyscraper could disrupt television broadcasts. This led Sears to approve of installing an antenna atop the tower. The black glass-clad skyscraper uses a bundled tube structure, with nine square tubes that are set back at different heights. The Sears Tower was completed in 1974, not only becoming the tallest building in Chicago, but the tallest building in the United States, and the world, overtaking New York City's World Trade Center complex.

=== 1980s–1990s ===
Chicago's skyline in the 1990s

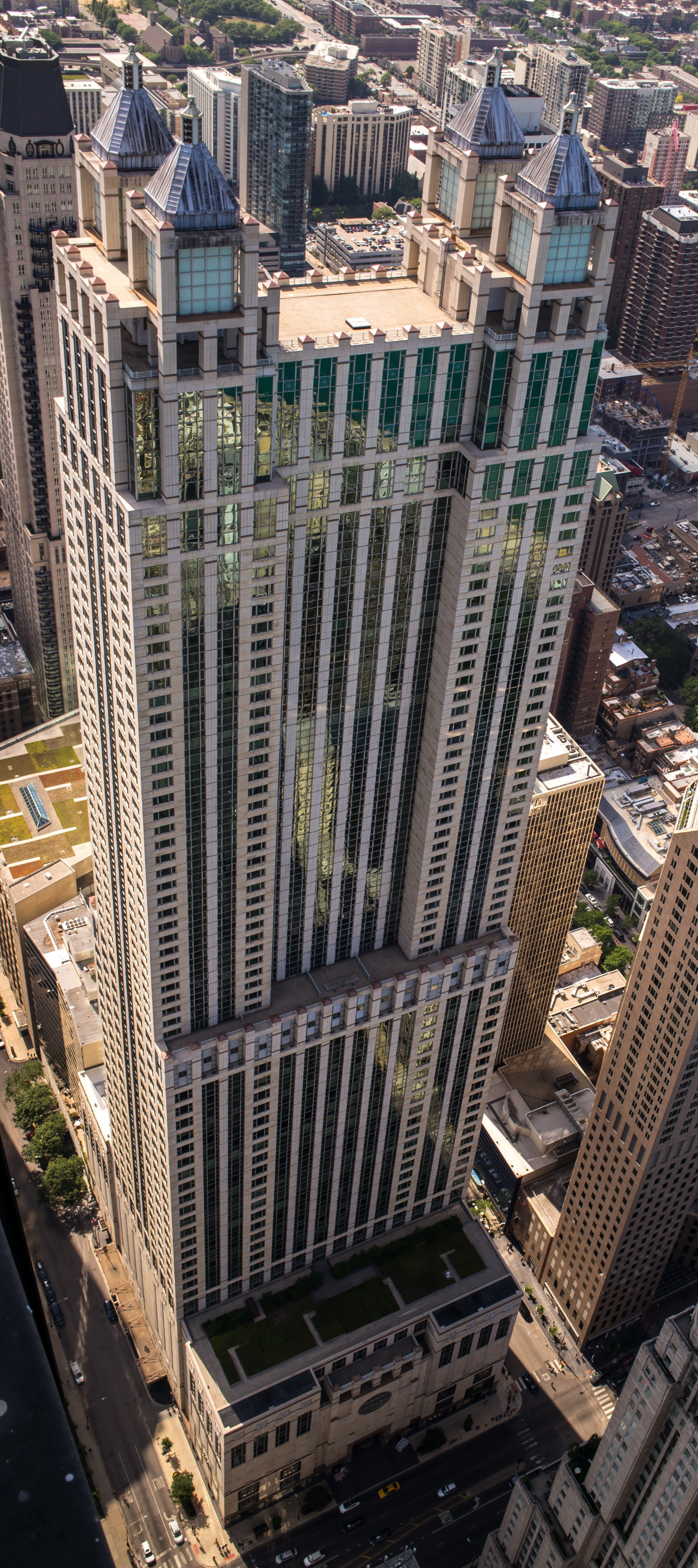
The four lanterns on 900 North Michigan Avenue are its most distinctive feature

A minor slowdown in skyscraper construction in Chicago occurred in the mid-1970s, affected by the 1973–1975 recession. The 1980s was a very productive decade for skyscrapers in Chicago. Postmodern architectural trends influenced the design of several new skyscrapers during this period, including two additional supertall skyscrapers completed near the end of the decade: the Franklin Center, and Two Prudential Plaza. Located directly northeast of the Sears Tower and completed in 1989, the Franklin Center was built as the AT&T Corporate Center, following the split of the AT&T monopoly. The building is clad in granite, which changes shade from a deep-red color, to rose-beige at the top. The building's setbacks and the Gothic detailing evokes images of skyscrapers built in the 1920s. Two Prudential Plaza opened in 1990 to adjoin the Prudential Building–now renamed One Prudential Plaza–which had been built 38 years earlier. At the time of completion, Two Prudential was the world's tallest reinforced concrete building. Its distinctive shape features stacked chevron setbacks on the north and south sides and a pyramidal peak rotated 45 degrees.

Other postmodernist skyscrapers include One South Wacker (1982) and 900 North Michigan, a mixed-use tower containing a large, upscale shopping mall on the Magnificent Mile, built in 1989. The exterior of the tower is clad in limestone, although the building's most distinctive feature on the skyline are its four "lanterns" on the corners on top of the building. Adjacent to the Sears Tower to the south, 311 South Wacker Drive was completed in 1990. The skyscraper's crown consists of a translucent cylinder surrounded by four smaller cylinders, which was inspired by the massing of the Tribune Tower. Modernist developments continued with Huron Plaza (1983), a residential tower that was the first in the Near North Side's Cathedral District, and the mixed-use Olympia Centre (1986), its pink cladding provided by Swedish granite. The Onterie Center (Axis Apartments) has large 'X' formations; the building is considered the "final work" by Fazlur Rahman Khan, who died four years earlier in 1982 before the building's completion. In contrast, the NBC Tower, built in 1989, is in the Art Deco style, and bears a resemblance to 30 Rockefeller Plaza in New York City, NBC's global headquarters.

After 1992, there was a halt in skyscraper completions for nearly a decade due to the early 1990s recession. Thus, the rest of the 1990s saw little change in the city's skyline, until One Superior Place was completed in 1999. In 1998, Sears Tower was surpassed as the world's tallest building by the Petronas Towers in Kuala Lumpur, Malaysia. The decision by the Council of Tall Buildings and Urban Habitat that the Petronas Towers were taller than the Sears Tower was contentious, not least within Chicago itself. The Sears Tower was taller when measured by pinnacle height, due to its antennas, bringing the building to 1,729 feet (527.0 m), over 200 feet taller than the Petronas Towers' pinnacle height of 1,483 feet (451.9 m). In the ensuing controversy, four categories of "tallest building" were created.

=== 21st century ===
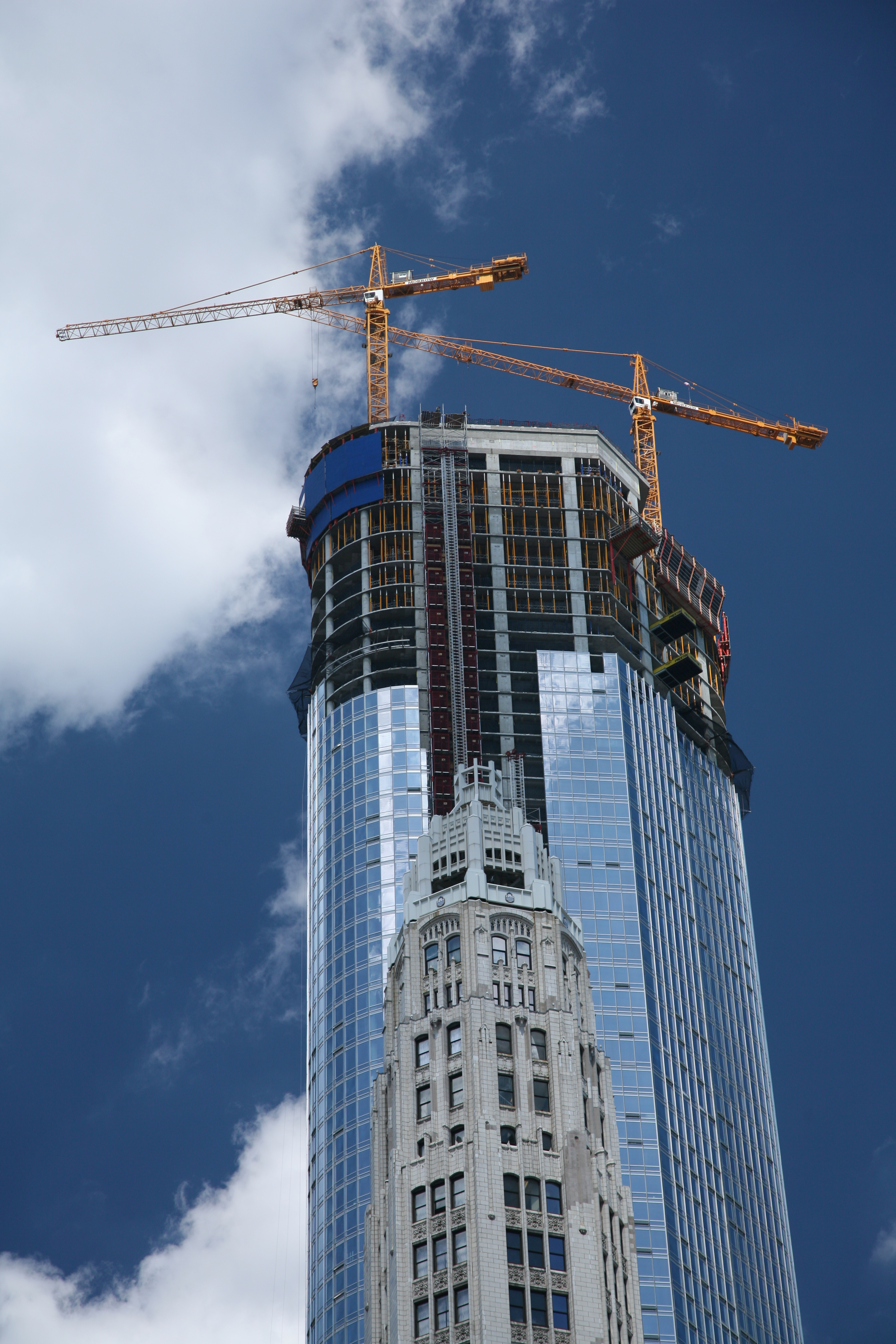
Trump International Hotel and Tower under construction in 2008, overlooking the Mather Tower

The 2000s was a period of strong growth for Chicago's skyline. 31 skyscrapers taller than 492 feet (150 m) were completed between 2000 and 2009, the most of any decade in the city's history. According to Crain's, the cumulative height of all tall buildings built during the decade added up to over 34,000 feet (10 km), driven by a buoyant real estate market. Residential skyscrapers, though already present in significant numbers on the skyline, made up an increasing share of new completions, as downtown living became more desirable. Despite the city's population decline during the decade, population growth was healthy in the Loop, continuing a trend that began in the 1990s. Notable residential buildings include Park Tower (2000), one of the world's tallest buildings to be clad with architectural precast concrete; One North Wacker (2001); Millennium Centre (2003) and 340 on the Park (2007).

In 2001, then real estate developer and later U.S. president Donald Trump announced plans for a skyscraper on the site of a seven-story building formerly occupied by the Chicago Sun-Times. The initial height of the proposal was 1,500 feet (457.2 m), which would have made it the world's tallest building. Following the September 11 attacks, Trump reduced the planned height of the building, to reduce the risk of similar attacks, although up until 2005, Trump had still aspired for a building taller than the Sears Tower, though this was rejected by Chicago mayor Richard M. Daley. Construction on the Trump International Hotel and Tower began in 2005 and was completed in 2009, becoming the second-tallest building in Chicago and the building with the highest residence in the world, overtaking Chicago's own John Hancock Center. The skyscraper's design features three setbacks designed to provide visual continuity with the surrounding skyline.

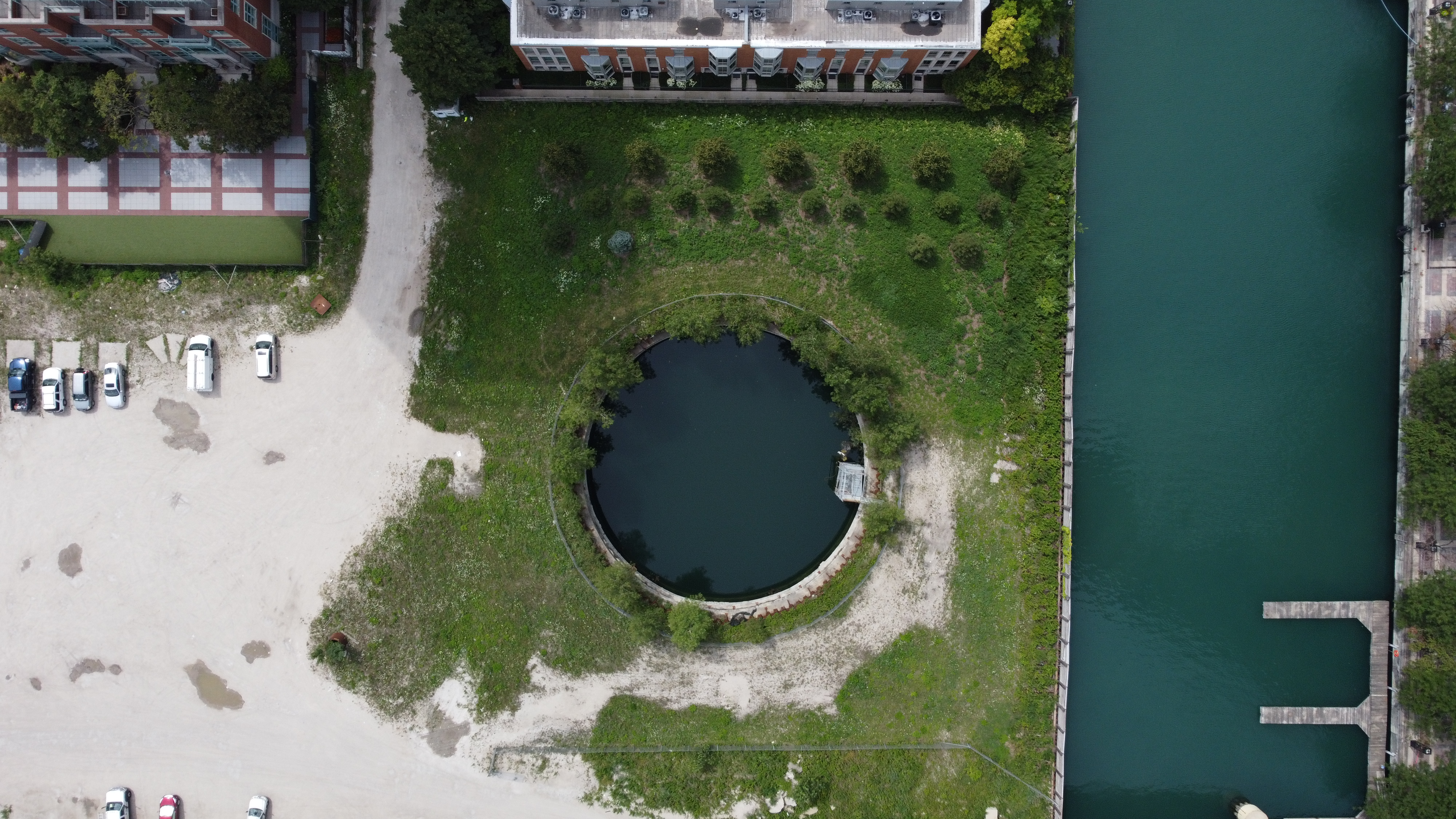
The infamous hole from the abandoned Chicago Spire project

The Great Recession caused another slowdown in skyscraper construction after 2010, which lasted until the middle of the decade. This affected some developments such as the Waterview Tower, where work on a planned supertall skyscraper had begun in 2005. The project was abandoned in 2008, and resumed in 2011 after another developer bought the site. Since known as OneEleven, the building was finally completed in 2015 at a reduced height. Perhaps the most significant casualty of the recession was the Chicago Spire. Proposed in 2005, the megatall skyscraper, designed by Spanish architect-engineer Santiago Calatrava, would have been 2,000 feet (610 m) high with 150 floors. Construction began in 2007, but was stopped a year later, as the subprime mortgage crisis set in. This left an infamous "hole" where the building's foundation had been completed.

Sears sold the Sears Tower in 1994 as part of a restructuring effort, but the building continued to be known officially under that name until 2009, when London-based insurance broker Willis Group Holdings agreed to lease a portion of the building and obtained naming rights for the building. On July, the building was renamed the Willis Tower. This change was met with considerable opposition, including from many Chicagoans, who continue to refer to the building as the Sears Tower today. Willis Tower was dethroned in 2013 as the tallest building in the United States by New York City's One World Trade Center.

==== Studio Gang ====
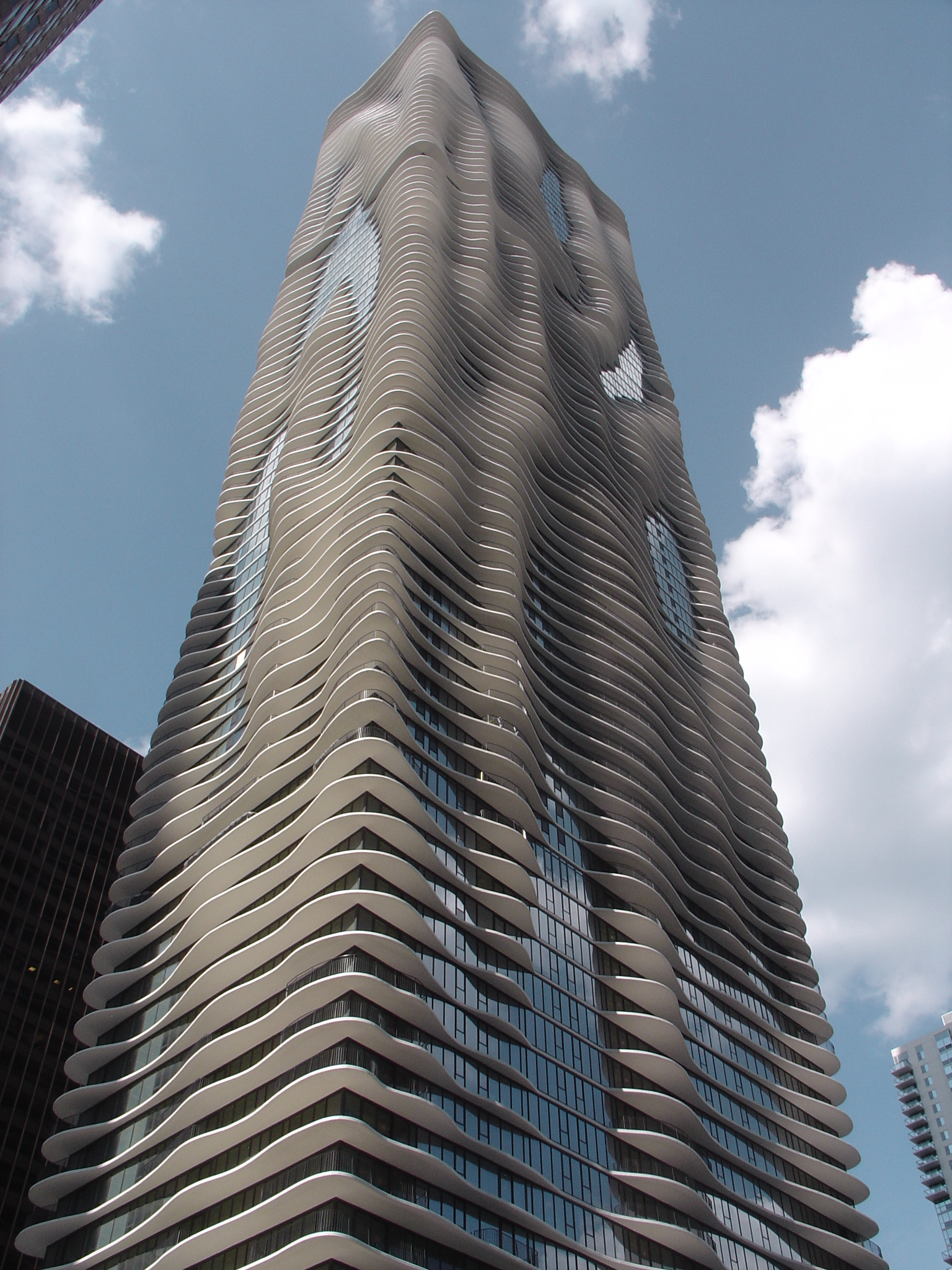
The undulating balconies of Aqua are inspired by limestone outcroppings

The second-tallest skyscraper built during the 2000s, Aqua, was completed in 2009. Designed by a team led by Jeanne Gang of Studio Gang Architects, the residential skyscraper is distinctive for its irregularly shaped concrete floor slabs, inspired by the striated limestone outcroppings that can are commonly found in the Great Lakes, which lend the facade an undulating, sculptural quality. Aqua was awarded the Emporis Skyscraper Award as 2009 skyscraper of the year, and was shortlisted in 2010 for the biennial International High-Rise Award.

Aqua was the world's tallest building designed by a woman until the construction of the St. Regis Chicago, which Gang also designed. At 1,198 feet (365 m), the St. Regis Chicago is the city's third tallest building, and its newest supertall skyscraper. Similarly to Aqua, it features a curvilinear design as a defining feature of the building, consisting of three interconnected masses covered by six different shades of glass. The building was completed in 2020 amidst the COVID-19 Pandemic, delaying the opening of the hotel portion of the building until 2023.

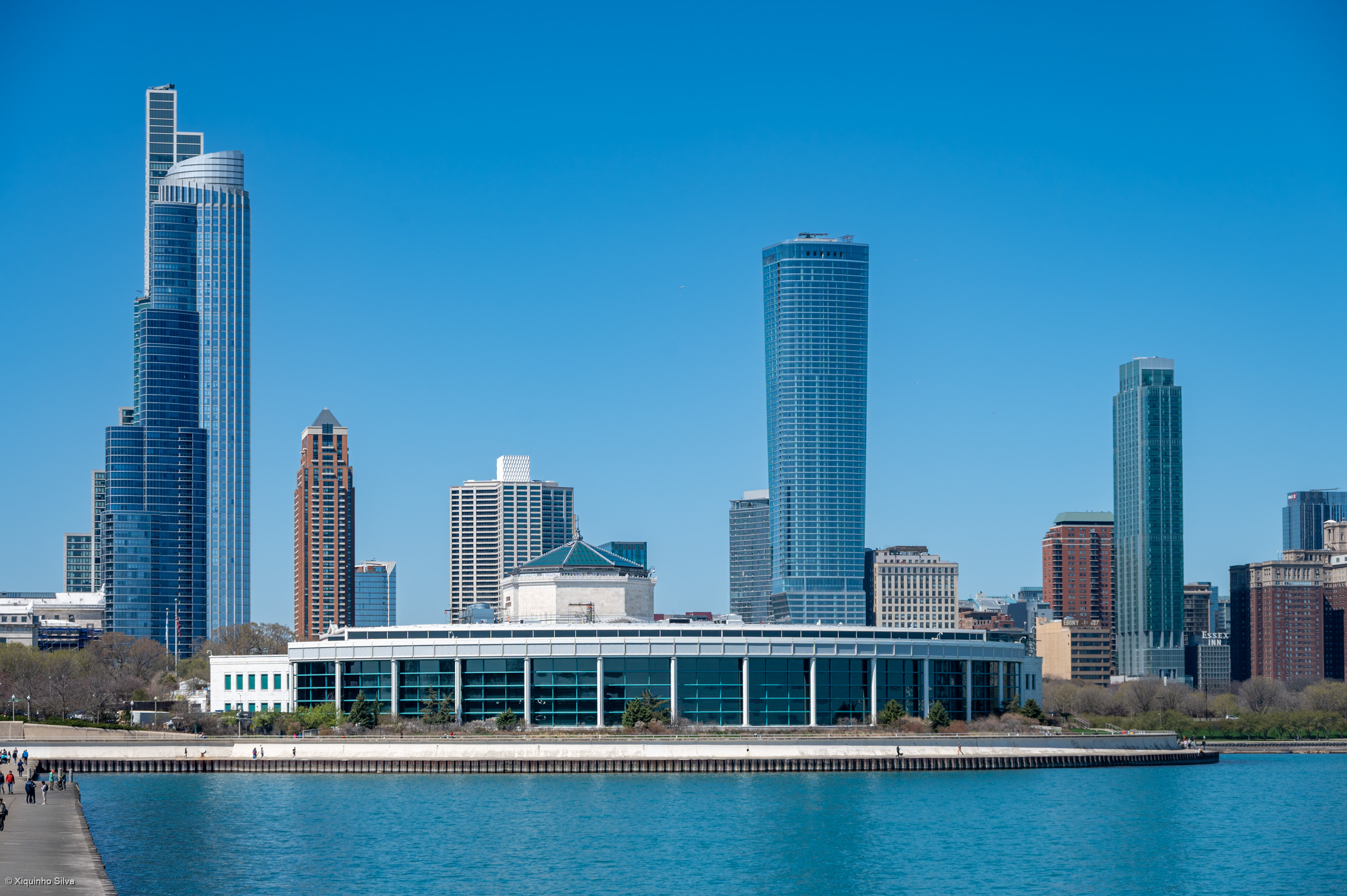
One Museum Park and NEMA Chicago (left), 1000M (center), and Essex on the Park (right) are the tallest buildings in South Loop, all built after 2009

==== South Loop and West Loop ====
South Loop has emerged as a new area for skyscrapers in the 21st century, particularly with the completion of the 726 feet (221 m) One Museum Park in 2009, making it the tallest building on the South Side. As development resumed in the 2010s, One Museum Park would be surrounded by Essex on the Park and the even taller NEMA Chicago. Built in 2019, NEMA Chicago's stacked square pays homage to the Willis Tower, and uses a similar "bundled tube" configuration. In 2024, 1000M was completed in the area, becoming the second tallest building on the South Side. The skyscraper features a "deliberate change in form" between the lower 19 floors, which complements the surrounding Historic Michigan Boulevard District, and the tower portion above.

From the 2010s onward, the skyline has gradually expanded westwards into the Near West Side, mainly the West Loop area, which includes the Fulton Market District. 727 West Madison was completed there in 2018, the first building above 492 feet (150 m) in the area. This was followed by The Row (900 West Randolph) even further west in 2023. More skyscrapers and high-rises are planned for the area, Some of the tallest planned to be built which are 725 W Randolph Street, which aims to be 665 feet (203 m) tall, 420 N May, which aims to be at least 600 feet (182 m) tall, and 1300 W Lake, which aims to be 530 feet (161 m) tall.

==== Mega-developments ====
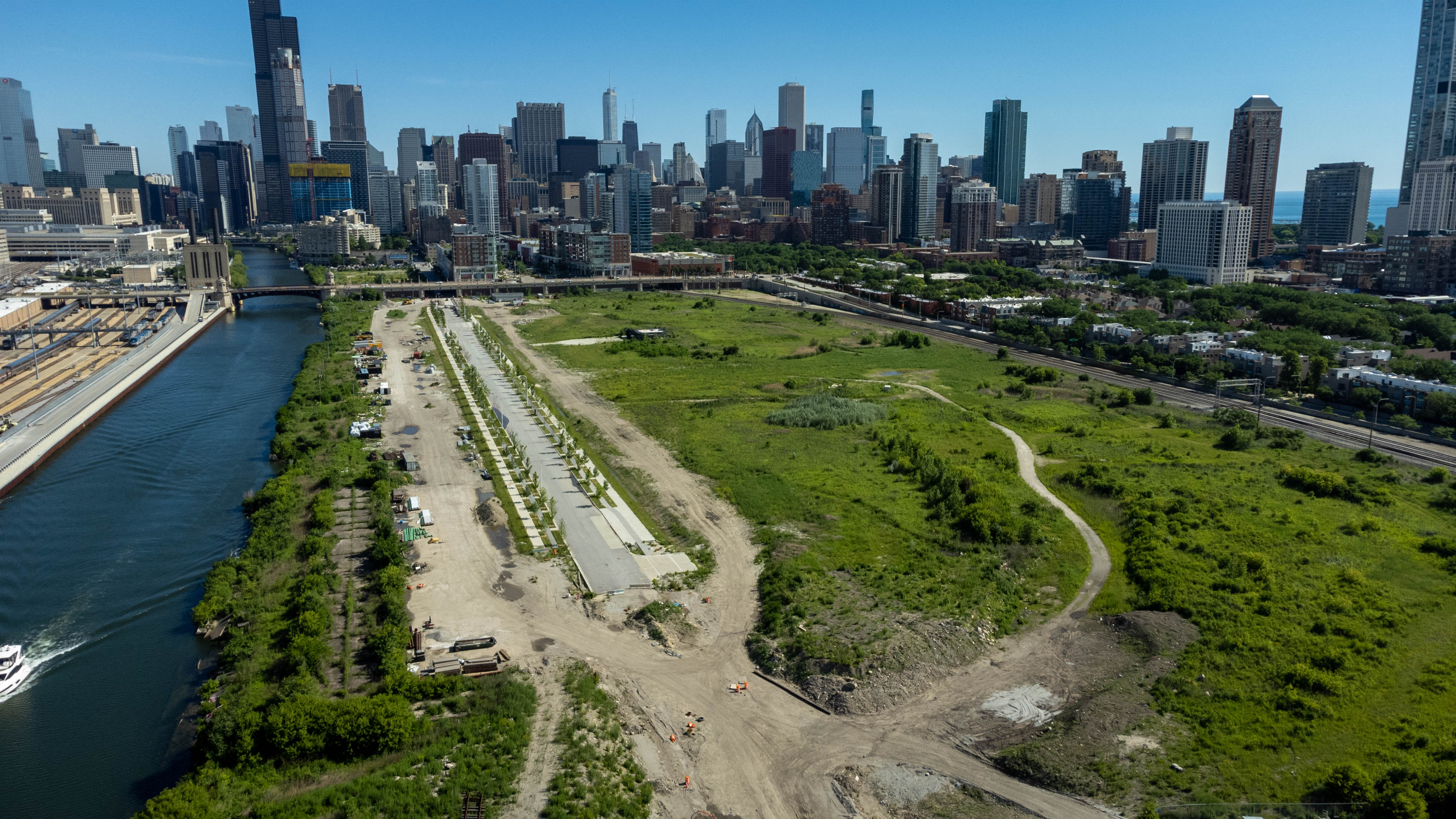
The site of The 78, a rectangular plot west of downtown on the Chicago River

A number of large-scale redevelopments, or "mega-developments", have been proposed in Chicago in the early 21st century, each containing a number of high-rises, though none have yet been fully realized. The 78 is a plot of land from Roosevelt Road south to 16th Street and Clark Street, along the Chicago River. Its name is a reference to the Chicago's 77 existing community areas. The site has been unoccupied since a railyard was demolished in the 1970s. Many plans have been proposed or discussed for this site; a recent iteration of the plans will involve the construction of a new baseball stadium for the Chicago White Sox; another includes a proposal for a new soccer stadium for Chicago Fire FC.

Another mega-development, Lincoln Yards, would be located northwest of downtown, occupying more than 50 acres (20 ha) of land on both sides of the North Branch of the Chicago River. Plans included several towers and high-rises for apartments, condos, office, retail, and entertainment. Owing to financial issues, the proposal was shelved in 2025. A 31-acre (13 ha) portion of the land was transferred to JDL Development and Kayne Anderson Real Estate in 2025. The new developers have proposed a more modest project named Foundry Park, containing fewer high-rises.

Bronzeville Lakefront is a 48-acre (19 ha) development in Bronzeville that will include over 5,000 new residential units in several mid-rises and high-rises, 20% of which would be affordable units, alongside the rehabilitation of the Singer Pavilion, a new senior housing building, and a 40,000 square foot community center. Construction of the project began in 2023 and is scheduled to be complete in 2035.

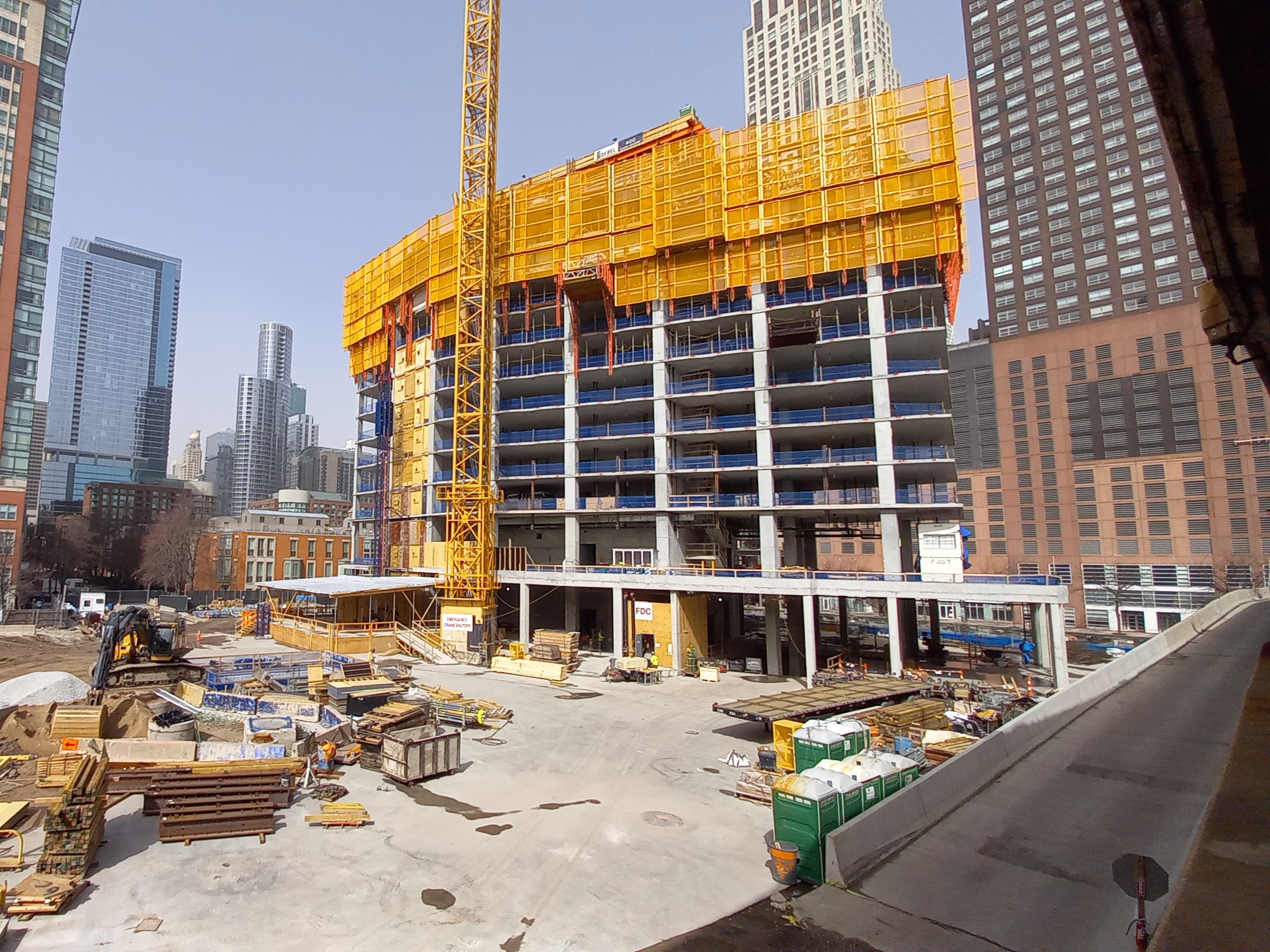
Construction on the northern tower of 400 Lake Shore in 2025

The 1901 Project, in the Near West Side, will revitalize over 55 acres (22 ha) of parking lots around the United Center. The multi-phase project is being led by the Reinsdorf and Wirtz families, owner of the Chicago Bulls and Chicago Blackhawks respectively. The masterplan is expected to be completed in 2040, delivering 9,463 residential units, 1,309 hotel rooms, 660,000 square feet of office space, 670,000 square feet of retail space.

==== Future ====
Chicago's tallest proposed building is the Tribune East Tower, to be built on the eastern side of the famed Tribune Tower; at 1,442 ft (440 m), it would overtake Trump International Hotel and Tower as the city's second-tallest building. Plans were approved in 2020, although no construction has begun. By the mid-2020s, Chicago had seen a considerable decrease in the rate of new skyscrapers being built. High construction costs and interest rates have sharply reduced the number of new condominium projects downtown. By 2026, the only two projects taller than 400 feet (122 m) under construction is One Foundry Park built on the former Lincoln Yards site, and Halsted Pointe Phase 1, built on Goose Island (Chicago).

The World Technology Center is an early-stage pre-development proposal that was announced in the mid 2020s and slated to be built in the Near West Side by 2040 or 2050 (specifically southwest of the Old Post Office building on an underdeveloped site). Spread on a 35-acre (14-hectare) campus, it would function as a vertical national laboratory campus for STEM research, development and education, with public, residential and nature amenities. Its significant architectural statement is 110-story Twin Towers that modernize the silhouette of the original World Trade Center, but with improved structural and aesthetical design. It is slated to rise 1,510 ft (460 m) to the roof, and 1,969 ft (600 m) to the spire (on the Science South Tower), which aims to symbolize the Apollo 11 moon landing. The project gained national and international media attention in 2026, and is spearheaded primarily as a non-profit philanthropic initiative led by Raphael Chryslar, Kenneth Gardner, and other industry and academic collaborators. However, it is unclear whether or not this project would be built as it remains in the conceptual stage.

== Cityscape ==
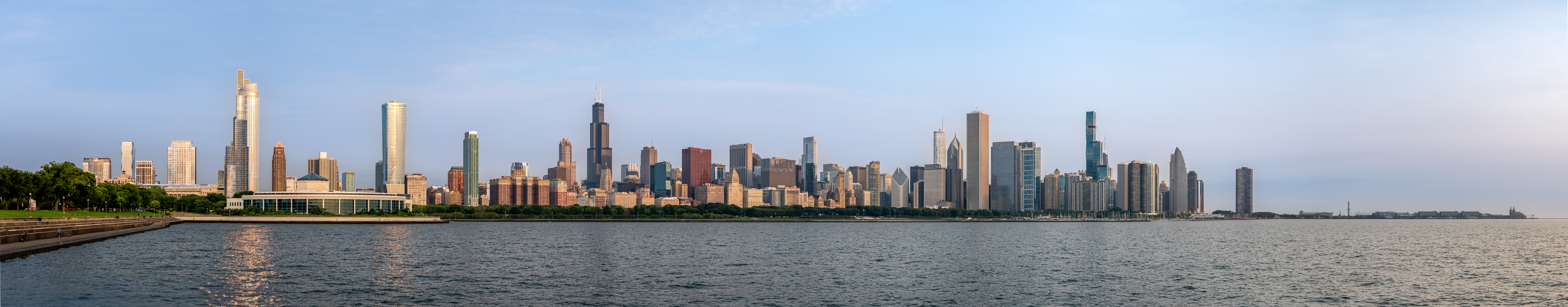
The Chicago skyline as seen from the Adler Planetarium in 2026

== Map of tallest buildings ==
This map shows the location of skyscrapers taller than 492 feet (150 m) in Chicago. With the exception of two residential towers, Park Place Tower and Park Tower Condominiums, all of them are located in Downtown Chicago. Each marker is colored by the decade of the skyscraper's completion.

Buildings taller than 492 ft (150 m) in Chicago. An asterisk (*) next to the building's name indicates it is located outside the map.
- 1950s and before
- 1960s
- 1970s
- 1980s
- 1990s
- 2000s
- 2010s
- 2020s
1 Willis Tower
2 Trump International Hotel and Tower
3 St. Regis Chicago
4 Aon Center
5 875 North Michigan Avenue
6 Franklin Center
7 Two Prudential Plaza
8 One Chicago East Tower
9 311 South Wacker Drive
10 NEMA Chicago
11 900 North Michigan
12 Chase Tower
13 Water Tower Place
14 Aqua
15 400 Lake Shore Drive North Tower
16 Park Tower
17 One Bennett Park
18 Salesforce Tower Chicago
19 The Legacy at Millennium Park
20 110 North Wacker
21 1000M
22 300 North LaSalle
23 Three First National Plaza
24 Grant Thornton Tower
25 Blue Cross Blue Shield Tower
26 River Point
27 Olympia Centre
28 BMO Tower
29 One Museum Park
30 150 North Riverside
31 330 North Wabash
32 Waldorf Astoria Chicago
33 111 South Wacker Drive
34 181 West Madison Street
35 71 South Wacker
36 One Magnificent Mile
37 340 on the Park
38 77 West Wacker Drive
39 Wolf Point East Tower
40 One North Wacker
41 Richard J. Daley Center
42 55 East Erie Street
43 Lake Point Tower
44 River East Center
45 Grand Plaza I
46 155 North Wacker
47 Leo Burnett Building
48 The Heritage at Millennium Park
49 OneEleven
50 NBC Tower
51 353 North Clark
52 Essex on the Park
53 Millennium Centre
54 Chicago Place
55 Chicago Board of Trade Building
56 One Prudential Plaza
57 333 South Wabash
58 Heller International Building
59 200 West Madison
60 The Grant
61 1000 Lake Shore Plaza
62 The Clare
63 Accenture Tower
64 Marina City I
65 Marina City II
66 Optima Signature
67 Mid-Continental Plaza
68 Crain Communications Building
69 North Pier Apartments
70 Citadel Center
71 The Fordham
72 One Chicago West Tower
73 190 South LaSalle Street
74 One South Dearborn
75 Axis Apartments
76 Loews Hotel Tower
77 Chicago Temple Building
78 Palmolive Building
79 Kluczynski Federal Building
80 Cirrus
81 Huron Plaza
82 Boeing International Headquarters
83 Pittsfield Building
84 The Parkshore
85 North Harbor Tower
86 Civic Opera House
87 Harbor Point
88 Atwater Apartments
89 30 North LaSalle
90 Michigan Plaza South
91 Newberry Plaza
92 One South Wacker
93 Park Millennium
94 AMLI River North
95 The Franklin – South Tower
96 Field Building
97 The Pinnacle
98 Park Place Tower*
99 One North LaSalle
100 Elysées Condominiums
101 465 North Park
102 River Plaza
103 35 East Wacker
104 Arrive Michigan Avenue
105 Kemper Building
106 Mather Tower
107 30 South Wacker
108 10 South Wacker
109 The Columbian
110 151 North Franklin
111 191 North Wacker
112 425 South Financial Place
113 401 East Ontario
114 Millie on Michigan
115 The Streeter
116 Park Tower Condominiums*
117 600 North Lake Shore Drive (S)
118 LaSalle-Wacker Building
119 Harris Bank Addition II
120 321 North Clark
121 215 West
122 Carbide & Carbon Building
123 400 East Ohio Street
124 One Superior Place
125 10 South LaSalle
126 120 North LaSalle
127 200 South Wacker Drive
128 The Tides at Lakeshore East
129 Parkview West
130 500 North Lake Shore Drive
131 727 West Madison
132 55 West Monroe
133 Ontario Place
134 The Row
135 50 East Chestnut Stree
136 The Ritz-Carlton Residences
137 PNC Center
138 No. 9 Walton

== Tallest buildings ==
There are 138 completed and topped-out skyscrapers that stand at least 492 feet (150 m) tall in Chicago, based on standard height measurement which includes spires and architectural details but does not include antenna masts. Buildings tied in height are sorted by year of completion with earlier buildings ranked first, and then alphabetically.

Was the tallest building in Chicago upon completion
Architecturally topped out but not yet completed

Rank	Name	Image	Location	Height ft (m)	Floors	Year	Purpose	Notes
1	Willis Tower		41°52′44″N 87°38′9″W	1,451 (442)	110	1974	Office	Formerly known as Sears Tower, a name it is still commonly called today; 3rd-tallest building in the United States, 26th-tallest building in the world; tallest building in the world from 1974 until 1998. Also the tallest building in the Midwest. Tallest building completed in Chicago in the 1970s.
2	Trump International Hotel and Tower		41°53′20″N 87°37′35″W	1,388 (423)	98	2009	Mixed-use	7th-tallest building in the United States; tallest building completed in Chicago in the 2000s. A mixed-use residential and hotel skyscraper.
3	St. Regis Chicago	St. Regis Chicago	41°53′14″N 87°37′02″W	1,198 (363)	101	2020	Mixed-use	Formerly known as the Wanda Vista Tower; 11th-tallest building in the United States, and the tallest skyscraper in the world designed by a woman. It is the newest supertall skyscraper in Chicago. Tallest building completed in Chicago in the 2020s. A mixed-use residential and hotel skyscraper.
4	Aon Center	2006-06-07 840x1500 Chicago aon building	41°53′7″N 87°37′17″W	1,136 (346)	83	1973	Office	12th-tallest building in the U.S.; formerly known as the Standard Oil Building. Was the tallest building in Chicago before being surpassed by the Willis Tower.
5	875 North Michigan Avenue	Chicago (22332583569)	41°53′55.5″N 87°37′23″W	1,127 (344)	100	1969	Mixed-use	Previously known as John Hancock Center; 13th-tallest building in the United States; tallest building completed in the world in the 1960s; first building in the world outside of New York City to rise at least 1,000 feet (305 m). A mixed-use residential and office skyscraper. Was the tallest building in Chicago before being surpassed by the Aon Center.
6	Franklin Center		41°52′49.5″N 87°38′5″W	1,007 (307)	61	1989	Office	Formerly known as the AT&T Corporate Center; 27th-tallest building in the United States; tallest building completed in Chicago in the 1980s.
7	Two Prudential Plaza		41°53′8″N 87°37′22″W	995 (303)	64	1990	Office	30th-tallest building in the United States; tallest building completed in Chicago in the 1990s.
8	One Chicago East Tower		41°53′46″N 87°37′43″W	973 (296)	78	2022	Residential	37th-tallest building in the United States. Topped out in July 2021.
9	311 South Wacker Drive		41°52′39″N 87°38′8″W	961 (293)	65	1990	Office	39th-tallest building in the United States.
10	NEMA Chicago		41°52′1″N 87°37′23″W	896 (273)	76	2019	Residential	Tallest apartment building in Chicago. Tallest building completed in Chicago in the 2010s.
11	900 North Michigan		41°53′59″N 87°37′30″W	871 (266)	66	1989	Mixed-use	A mixed-use skyscraper with office, residential, and hotel components.
12	Chase Tower		41°52′53.5″N 87°37′48″W	869 (264.8)	60	1969	Office	Also known as First National Plaza. Replaced the Morrison Hotel, the tallest building to ever have been demolished in Chicago. Tallest building in Chicago briefly in 1969, before being surpassed by 875 North Michigan Avenue.
13	Water Tower Place		41°53′52.5″N 87°37′20.5″W	859 (261.9)	74	1976	Mixed-use	Currently a mixed-use skyscraper with residential and retail components and a Ritz-Carlton hotel.
14	Aqua		41°53′11″N 87°37′12″W	859 (261.8)	82	2009	Mixed-use	Currently the second-tallest building in the world designed by a female-led architectural firm; first skyscraper in Chicago to contain a hotel, condominiums, apartments and retail space.
15	400 Lake Shore Drive North Tower		41°53′23.53″N 87°36′53.6″W	850 (259.1)	72	2027	Residential	Approved on December 14, 2020. Groundbreaking ceremony was held in June 2024. Construction reached 38th floor in July 2025. Topped off in April 2026.
16	Park Tower		41°53′49.5″N 87°37′30.5″W	844 (257)	67	2000	Mixed-use	A mixed-use residential and hotel skyscraper.
17	One Bennett Park		41°53′30″N 87°36′56.4″W	837 (255)	69	2018	Residential	
18	Salesforce Tower Chicago		41°53′15.4″N 87°38′15.7″W	835 (255)	60	2023	Office	Formerly known as Wolf Point South Tower.
19	The Legacy at Millennium Park		41°52′53″N 87°37′32″W	822 (251)	73	2010	Residential	
20	110 North Wacker		41°53′1″N 87°38′15″W	814 (248)	51	2020	Office	
21	1000M		41°52′11.7″N 87°37′28.5″W	805 (245)	73	2024	Residential	Construction was temporarily halted in June 2020 due to funding issues and COVID-19 concerns; a revised design received city approval in June 2021 and construction resumed in December 2021. Topped out in July 2023.
22	300 North LaSalle		41°53′17.5″N 87°37′59″W	784 (239)	60	2008	Office	
23	Three First National Plaza		41°52′56″N 87°37′50″W	767 (234)	57	1981	Office	Also known by its address, 70 West Madison.
24	Grant Thornton Tower		41°53′5″N 87°37′50″W	755 (230)	50	1992	Office	Also known by its address, 161 North Clark.
25	Blue Cross Blue Shield Tower		41°53′5″N 87°37′12″W	744 (227)	54	2010	Office	The building was originally built in 1997 at 33 stories and a height of 411 feet (125.3 m). In 2010, 21 floors were added in a vertical expansion, along with 3 below-ground floors.
26	River Point		41°53′9.3″N 87°38′21.8″W	732 (223)	52	2017	Office	
27	Olympia Centre		41°53′47″N 87°37′24″W	731 (223)	63	1986	Mixed-use	Mixed-use office and residential skyscraper.
28	BMO Tower		41°52′38″N 87°38′24″W	729 (222)	51	2021	Office	
29	One Museum Park		41°52′1.5″N 87°37′17″W	726 (221)	62	2009	Residential	
30	150 North Riverside		41°53′07″N 87°38′18.5″W	724 (221)	54	2017	Office	Tallest building in the city west of the Chicago River.
31	330 North Wabash		41°53′19″N 87°37′39″W	695 (212)	52	1972	Mixed-use	Also known as the IBM Building, and formerly as AMA Plaza. Originally an office building. Currently a mixed-use office and hotel skyscraper.
32	Waldorf Astoria Chicago		41°53′59″N 87°37′39″W	686 (209)	60	2009	Mixed-use	Mixed-use residential and hotel building.
33	111 South Wacker Drive		41°52′49″N 87°38′10.5″W	681 (208)	51	2005	Office	
34	181 West Madison Street		41°52′53.5″N 87°38′00″W	680 (207)	50	1990	Office	
35	71 South Wacker		41°52′51″N 87°38′10″W	679 (207)	48	2005	Office	
36	One Magnificent Mile		41°54′2″N 87°37′29″W	673 (205)	57	1983	Mixed-use	Mixed-use office and residential building.
37	340 on the Park		41°53′5.5″N 87°37′8″W	672 (205)	64	2007	Residential	
38	77 West Wacker Drive		41°53′11.5″N 87°37′50″W	668 (204)	49	1992	Office	Formerly known as the United Building and the R.R. Donnelley Building.
39	Wolf Point East Tower		41°53′16.1″N 87°38′12.4″W	668 (204)	60	2020	Residential	
40	One North Wacker		41°52′56″N 87°38′10″W	652 (199)	50	2001	Office	Also known as the UBS Tower.
41	Richard J. Daley Center		41°53′2.5″N 87°37′49″W	648 (198)	32	1965	Office	Tallest flat-roofed building in the world that contains fewer than 40 floors. Was the tallest building in Chicago before being surpassed by Chase Tower.
42	55 East Erie Street		41°53′38″N 87°37′33″W	647 (197)	56	2004	Residential	
43	Lake Point Tower		41°53′30″N 87°36′44″W	645 (197)	70	1968	Residential	The only tower in the city that sits on the east side of Lake Shore Drive.
44	River East Center		41°53′29″N 87°37′5.5″W	644 (196)	58	2001	Residential	
45	Grand Plaza I		41°53′31″N 87°37′43″W	641 (195)	57	2003	Residential	
46	155 North Wacker		41°53′5″N 87°38′11.5″W	638 (195)	45	2009	Office	
47	Leo Burnett Building		41°53′11″N 87°37′45″W	635 (194)	50	1989	Office	
48	The Heritage at Millennium Park		41°53′3″N 87°37′32″W	631 (192)	57	2005	Residential	
49	OneEleven		41°53′11.5″N 87°37′53″W	630 (192)	59	2014	Residential	Formally 111 W. Wacker and Waterview Tower.
50	NBC Tower		41°53′24″N 87°37′16″W	627 (191)	37	1989	Office	
51	353 North Clark		41°53′20″N 87°37′48″W	624 (190)	44	2009	Office	
52	Essex on the Park		41°52′17.4″N 87°37′28.9″W	620 (189)	57	2019	Residential	
53	Millennium Centre		41°53′35″N 87°37′45″W	610 (186)	58	2003	Residential	
54	Chicago Place		41°53′43″N 87°37′30.5″W	608 (185)	49	1991	Mixed-use	Mixed-use residential and office building.
55	Chicago Board of Trade Building		41°52′39.5″N 87°37′56″W	605 (184)	44	1930	Office	One of the tallest Art Deco buildings in the world; tallest building completed in Chicago in the 1930s. Was the tallest building in Chicago before being surpassed by the Richard J. Daley Center.
56	One Prudential Plaza		41°53′5″N 87°37′24″W	601 (183)	41	1955	Office	Tallest building completed in Chicago in the 1950s.
57	333 South Wabash		41°52′38″N 87°37′32″W	601 (183)	44	1972	Office	
58	Heller International Building		41°52′51″N 87°38′25″W	600 (183)	45	1992	Office	
59	200 West Madison		41°52′56″N 87°38′4″W	599 (182)	44	1982	Office	
60	The Grant		41°52′1.5″N 87°37′19″W	595 (181)	54	2010	Residential	
61	1000 Lake Shore Plaza		41°54′3.5″N 87°37′28″W	590 (180)	55	1964	Residential	
62	The Clare		41°53′50″N 87°37′34″W	589 (179)	52	2009	Residential	An independent-living community for seniors
63	Accenture Tower		41°52′56″N 87°38′26″W	588 (179)	42	1987	Office	
64	Marina City I		41°53′17.5″N 87°37′42.5″W	588 (179)	61	1964	Residential	Marina City was the first building in the United States to be constructed with the Linden climbing tower cranes. It was also the first post-war urban high-rise residential complex in the United States. The two towers were both the tallest residential and tallest concrete structures in the world upon completion in 1968.
65	Marina City II		41°53′16.5″N 87°37′45″W	588 (179)	61	1964	Residential	Marina City was the first building in the United States to be constructed with the Linden climbing tower cranes. It was also the first post-war urban high-rise residential complex in the United States. The two towers were both the tallest residential and tallest concrete structures in the world upon completion in 1968.
66	Optima Signature		41°53′29.5″N 87°37′18″W	587 (179)	57	2017	Residential	
67	Mid-Continental Plaza		41°52′49″N 87°37′32.5″W	583 (178)	49	1972	Mixed-use	Also known by its address, 55 East Monroe. Mixed-use office and residential skyscraper.
68	Crain Communications Building		41°53′5″N 87°37′30″W	582 (177)	41	1983	Office	Also known by its address, 150 North Michigan Avenue.
69	North Pier Apartments		41°53′27″N 87°36′52.5″W	581 (177)	61	1990	Residential	
70	Citadel Center		41°52′47″N 87°37′43″W	580 (177)	39	2003	Office	
71	The Fordham		41°53′43.5″N 87°37′38″W	574 (175)	52	2003	Residential	
72	One Chicago West Tower		41°53′47″N 87°37′46″W	574 (174)	49	2021	Residential	Also known as 23 West Chicago Avenue.
73	190 South LaSalle Street		41°52′47″N 87°37′58″W	573 (175)	40	1987	Office	
74	One South Dearborn		41°52′54″N 87°37′43″W	571 (174)	39	2005	Office	
75	Axis Apartments		41°53′38″N 87°36′59″W	570 (174)	60	1986	Residential	Formerly known as the Onterie Center. Originally an office tower.
76	Loews Hotel Tower		41°53′23.9″N 87°37′8″W	569 (174)	52	2015	Mixed-use	Mixed-use hotel and residential skyscraper.
77	Chicago Temple Building	Chicago Temple Building5 (cropped)	41°52′59″N 87°37′50″W	568 (173)	21	1924	Mixed-use	Tallest building completed in Chicago in the 1920s. Was the tallest building in Chicago before being surpassed by the Chicago Board Of Trade Building.
78	Palmolive Building		41°53′59″N 87°37′25″W	565 (172)	37	1929	Office	
79	Kluczynski Federal Building		41°52′42.2″N 87°37′47.6″W	562 (171)	42	1974	Office	
80	Cirrus		41°53′11″N 87°36′53″W	562 (171)	37	2021	Residential	
81	Huron Plaza		41°53′43″N 87°37′36″W	560 (171)	56	1983	Residential	
82	Boeing International Headquarters		41°53′2.5″N 87°38′19″W	560 (171)	36	1990	Office	Also known as the Boeing Building or by its address, 100 North Riverside Plaza. Was the headquarters of Boeing from 2001 to 2022.
83	Pittsfield Building		41°52′59″N 87°37′52.5″W	557 (170)	38	1927	Office	
84	The Parkshore		41°53′8.5″N 87°36′53″W	556 (169)	56	1991	Residential	
85	North Harbor Tower		41°53′7.5″N 87°36′55.5″W	556 (169)	55	1988	Residential	
86	Civic Opera House		41°52′57″N 87°38′14.5″W	555 (169)	45	1929	Mixed-use	Most of the 45-story building is office space. The lower floors house a performance space that is the second-largest opera auditorium in North America, after the Metropolitan Opera House.
87	Harbor Point		41°53′6″N 87°36′53″W	554 (169)	54	1975	Residential	
88	Atwater Apartments		41°53′32″N 87°37′5″W	554 (169)	55	2009	Residential	Also known as Streeter Place.
89	30 North LaSalle		41°52′58″N 87°37′58.5″W	553 (169)	44	1975	Office	
90	Michigan Plaza South		41°53′10″N 87°37′25″W	553 (169)	46	1985	Office	
91	Newberry Plaza		41°54′05″N 87°37′44″W	553 (169)	53	1974	Residential	
92	One South Wacker		41°52′54″N 87°38′10″W	550 (168)	40	1982	Office	
93	Park Millennium	–	41°53′12″N 87°37′17″W	544 (166)	57	2002	Residential	
94	AMLI River North	–	41°53′23″N 87°37′51″W	543 (166)	49	2013	Residential	
95	The Franklin – South Tower	–	41°52′47″N 87°38′05″W	538 (164)	35	1992	Office	
96	Field Building		41°52′47″N 87°37′54″W	535 (163)	45	1934	Mixed-use	Originally an office building, now a mixed-use office and residential building.
97	The Pinnacle	–	41°53′40″N 87°37′38″W	535 (163)	48	2004	Residential	
98	Park Place Tower		41°57′16″N 87°38′50″W	531 (162)	56	1971	Residential	
99	One North LaSalle		41°52′56″N 87°37′55″W	530 (162)	48	1930	Office	
100	Elysées Condominiums		41°53′52″N 87°37′31″W	529 (161)	56	1973	Residential	
101	465 North Park		41°53′27″N 87°37′09″W	525 (160)	48	2018	Residential	
102	River Plaza		41°53′24″N 87°37′33″W	524 (160)	56	1977	Residential	
103	35 East Wacker		41°53′11″N 87°37′36″W	523 (159)	40	1927	Office	
104	Arrive Michigan Avenue	–	41°51′54″N 87°37′28″W	523 (159)	48	2019	Residential	Also known as The Paragon.
105	Kemper Building		41°53′11″N 87°37′39″W	522 (159)	41	1962	Office	Also known as the United Insurance Building, or Unitrin Building.
106	Mather Tower		41°53′15″N 87°37′32″W	521 (159)	38	1928	Hotel	Also known as Club Quarters River Hotel
107	30 South Wacker		41°52′51″N 87°38′15″W	520 (158)	40	1983	Office	Also known as "the Merc"; part of the Chicago Mercantile Exchange Center.
108	10 South Wacker		41°52′54″N 87°38′15″W	520 (158)	40	1987	Office	
109	The Columbian		41°52′04″N 87°37′28″W	517 (158)	47	2008	Residential	
110	151 North Franklin		41°53′05″N 87°38′06″W	517 (158)	35	2018	Office	In June 2018, 151 North Franklin became the new corporate headquarters for CNA Insurance, which has been headquartered in the Chicago Loop since 1900. CNA Insurance was previously located at 333 South Wabash.
111	191 North Wacker		41°53′07″N 87°38′11″W	516 (157)	37	2002	Office	
112	425 South Financial Place		41°52′33″N 87°37′56″W	515 (157)	39	1985	Office	Also known as One Financial Place
113	401 East Ontario	–	41°53′36″N 87°37′01″W	515 (157)	51	1990	Residential	
114	Millie on Michigan	–	41°53′13″N 87°37′30″W	515 (157)	47	2022	Residential	
115	The Streeter	–	41°53′32″N 87°37′09″W	514 (157)	50	2007	Residential	
116	Park Tower Condominiums		41°58′48″N 87°39′17″W	513 (156)	54	1973	Residential	Not to be confused with Park Tower. Also known as 5415 North Sheridan.
117	600 North Lake Shore Drive – South Tower		41°53′34″N 87°36′54″W	513 (156)	47	2009	Residential	
118	LaSalle-Wacker Building		41°53′11″N 87°37′55″W	512 (156)	41	1930	Office	
119	Harris Bank Addition II		41°52′49″N 87°37′55″W	510 (155)	55	1974	Office	Officially renamed to the Jesse White State of Illinois building in 2025.
120	321 North Clark		41°53′18″N 87°37′50″W	510 (155)	38	1987	Office	Also known as Quaker Tower.
121	215 West		41°52′59″N 87°38′04″W	509 (155)	50	2010	Residential	
122	Carbide & Carbon Building		41°53′12″N 87°37′30″W	503 (153)	37	1929	Hotel	Now a hotel known as Pendry Chicago.
123	400 East Ohio Street	–	41°53′34″N 87°37′03″W	503 (153)	50	1982	Residential	
124	One Superior Place	–	41°53′44″N 87°37′45″W	502 (153)	52	1999	Residential	
125	10 South LaSalle		41°52′54″N 87°37′58″W	501 (153)	37	1986	Office	Formerly known under several names, including Chemical Plaza, Manufacturers Hanover Plaza, and Chase Plaza.
126	120 North LaSalle		41°53′01″N 87°37′58″W	501 (153)	39	1992	Office	
127	200 South Wacker Drive		41°52′44″N 87°38′15″W	500 (152)	41	1981	Office	
128	The Tides at Lakeshore East		41°53′12″N 87°37′05″W	500 (152)	51	2008	Residential	
129	Parkview West	–	41°53′28″N 87°37′02″W	498 (152)	49	2008	Residential	
130	500 North Lake Shore Drive	–	41°53′30″N 87°36′53″W	497 (151)	47	2013	Residential	
131	727 West Madison		41°52′53″N 87°38′48″W	496 (151)	45	2018	Residential	Also known as 1 South Halsted.
132	55 West Monroe	–	41°52′49″N 87°37′47″W	495 (151)	41	1980	Office	Also known as the Xerox Center.
133	Ontario Place	–	41°53′37″N 87°37′40″W	495 (151)	49	1983	Residential	
134	The Row		41°53′06″N 87°39′01″W	495 (151) (Note: Height is an estimated minimum.)	43	2023	Residential	
135	50 East Chestnut Street		41°53′55″N 87°37′34″W	495 (151)	40	2008	Residential	
136	The Ritz-Carlton Residences	–	41°53′40″N 87°37′29″W	495 (151)	40	2012	Residential	
137	PNC Center	–	41°52′56″N 87°38′06″W	494 (151)	36	1992	Office	Also known as One North Franklin
138	No. 9 Walton	–	41°53′59″N 87°37′44″W	494 (151)	38	2018	Residential	

=== Tallest buildings by pinnacle height ===
This list ranks Chicago skyscrapers based on their pinnacle height, which includes radio masts and antennas. Standard architectural height measurement, which excludes antennas in building height, is included for comparative purposes. The "Year" column indicates the year in which a building was completed.

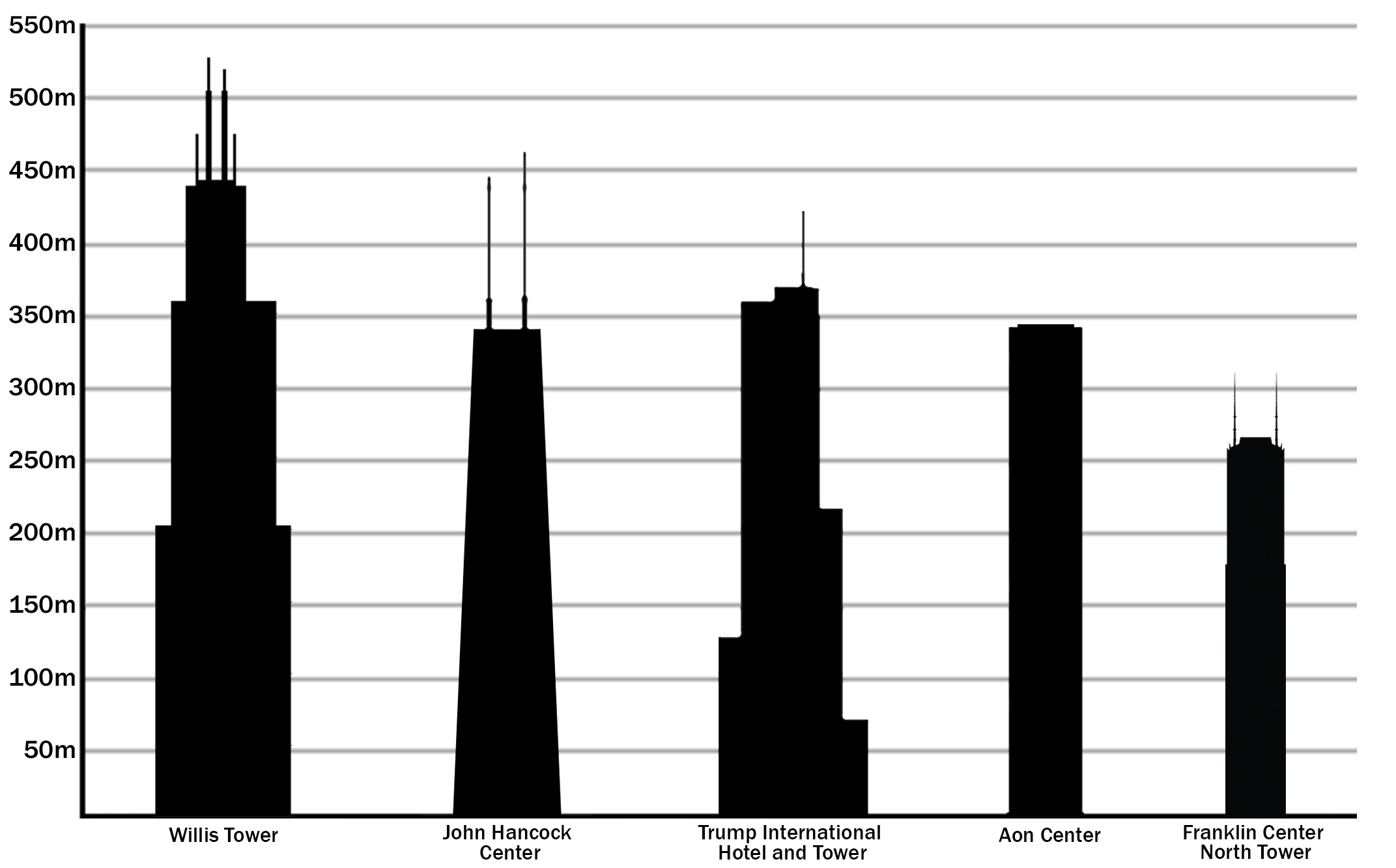
Tallest buildings in Chicago by pinnacle height. (As of 2019)

Pinn. rank	Std. rank	Name	Pinn. height ft (m)	Std. height ft (m)	Floors	Year	Source
1	1	Willis Tower	1,730 (527)	1,451 (442)	110	1974	
2	5	875 North Michigan Avenue	1,500 (457)	1,127 (344)	100	1969	
3	2	Trump International Hotel and Tower	1,389 (423)	1,389 (423)	98	2009	
4	3	St Regis Chicago	1,198 (365)	1,198 (365)	101	2020	
5	4	Aon Center	1,136 (346)	1,136 (346)	83	1973	
6	6	Franklin Center North Tower	1,007 (307)	887 (270)	61	1989	
7	7	Two Prudential Plaza	995 (303)	995 (303)	64	1990	
8	8	311 South Wacker Drive	961 (293)	961 (293)	65	1990	
9	51	One Prudential Plaza	912 (278)	601 (183)	41	1955	
10	9	NEMA Chicago	896 (273)	896 (273)	76	2019	

== Tallest demolished ==
Only one building in Chicago was demolished that stood at least 492 feet (150 m) in height.

Name	Image	Height ft (m)	Floors	Year completed	Year demolished	Purpose	Notes
Morrisons Hotel		526 (160)	45	1925	1965	Hotel	Was the tallest hotel in Chicago until its demolition. First building outside of New York City to have more than 40 floors. The hotel first opened in 1915, with the tower added during an expansion in 1925. It was demolished in 1965. The Chase Tower was later built on the site.

== Tallest under construction ==
There are two buildings under construction in Chicago that are planned to rise at least 492 feet (150 m) as of 2026.

Name	Location	Height ft (m)	Floors	Year	Notes
One Foundry Park	Foundry Park	520 (158.4)	38	2029	The initial phase of Foundry Park will include a 41-story tower along West Cortland Street and North Kingbury Street.
Halsted Pointe Phase 1	Goose Island (Chicago)	502 (153.0)	46	2028	This initial phase will consist of a 46-story tower designed by local architecture firm HPA. The skyscraper will be anchored by a five-story podium, which will meet the slope of Halsted as it descends from the nearby bridge. Construction started in April 2026. The project has a 24-month timeline.

== Tallest unbuilt ==
This lists buildings designed to rise at least 800 feet (244 m) that were approved for construction in Chicago but were cancelled prior to completion. This list does not include vision projects such as Gateway Tower or the Miglin-Beitler Skyneedle that were never intended to be built, nor does it include projects that were not approved by the Chicago Plan Commission such as the Waldorf-Astoria Hotel and Residence Tower.

Name	Height ft (m)	Floors	Approved	Cancelled	Notes
7 South Dearborn	2,000 (610)	112	1999	2000	One South Dearborn was built on the site instead.
Chicago Spire	2,000 (610)	150	2007	2014	400 Lake Shore Drive is the existing proposal for the site.
Old Chicago Main Post Office Twin Towers	2,000 (610)	120	2011	2014	Part of the Old Chicago Main Post Office Redevelopment pursued by Bill Davies.
Thompson Center Redevelopment	1,699 (518)	115	2017	2017	Thompson Center is acquired by Alphabet Inc. and is being renovated to become Google's new Midwest HQ.
Waterview Tower	1,047 (319)	89	2005	2008	The original design for Waterview Tower was cancelled after construction of the first 26 floors of the building. OneEleven was built on the vacated structure.

== Timeline of tallest buildings ==
Name	Image	Years as tallest (Yrs)	Height ft (m)	Floors	Notes
First Holy Name Cathedral^{[A]}	COLBERT(1871) p353 CHURCH OF THE HOLY NAME	1854–1869 (15)	245 (75)	1	
Saint Michael's Church		1869–1885 (16)	290 (88)	1	
Chicago Board of Trade Building^{[B]}		1885–1895 (10)	322 (98)	10	
Masonic Temple Building		1895–1899 (4)^{[C]}	302 (92)	21	
Montgomery Ward Building^{[D]}		1899–1922 (23)	394 (120)	22	
Wrigley Building		1922–1924 (2)	438 (134)	30	
Chicago Temple Building	Chicago Temple Building5 (cropped)	1924–1930 (6)	568 (173)	23	
Chicago Board of Trade Building		1930–1965 (35)	605 (184)	44	
Richard J. Daley Center		1965–1969 (4)	648 (198)	32	
Chase Tower (Chicago)		1969 (0)	850 (260)	60	
John Hancock Center	Chicago (22332583569)	1969–1973 (4)	1,127 (344)	100	
Aon Center	2006-06-07 840x1500 Chicago aon building	1973–1974 (1)	1,136 (346)	83	
Willis Tower		1974–present (52)	1,451 (442)	108	

=== Notes ===
A. This building was destroyed by the Great Chicago Fire in 1871, and replaced by the current cathedral of the same name in 1875.
B. The clock tower on this building was removed in 1895, allowing a shorter building to become the tallest in the city.
C. The Masonic Temple, built in 1892, became the tallest in Chicago three years later when the Board of Trade Building had its clock tower removed.
D. This building is currently 282 feet (86 m) tall, following the removal of a pyramid top and sculpture.

== See also ==
- Architecture of Chicago
- List of Chicago Landmarks
- List of cities with most skyscrapers
- List of tallest buildings in the United States
- List of buildings with over 100 floors
- List of tallest buildings in Illinois outside of Chicago

== Sources ==
- Bluestone, Daniel (1991). Constructing Chicago. New Haven, Connecticut, and London: Yale University Press. ISBN 9780300048483.
- Bragdon, Charles (2003) [First published 1909]. "Architecture in the United States III: The Skyscraper". In Shepherd, Roger (ed.). Skyscraper: the Search for an American Style, 1891–1941. New York: McGraw-Hill. ISBN 0071369708.
- Condit, Carl W. (1968). American Building: Materials and Techniques from the Beginning of the Colonial Settlements to the Present. Chicago and London: University of Chicago Press. OCLC 600614625.
- Cronon, William (1992). Nature's Metropolis: Chicago and the Great West. New York: Norton. ISBN 9780393308730.
- Fenske, Gail (2005). "The Beaux-Arts Architect and the Skyscraper: Cass Gilbert, the Professional Engineer, and the Rationalization of Construction in Chicago and New York". In Moudry, Roberta (ed.). The American Skyscraper: Cultural Histories. Cambridge: Cambridge University Press. ISBN 9780521624213.
- Fine, Lisa M. (2005). "The Female 'Souls of the Skyscraper'". In Moudry, Roberta (ed.). The American Skyscraper: Cultural Histories. Cambridge: Cambridge University Press. ISBN 9780521624213.
- Goldberger, Paul (1985). The Skyscraper. New York: Alfred A. Knopf. ISBN 0394715861.
- Kamin, Blair (2001). Why Architecture Matters: Lessons from Chicago. University of Chicago Press. ISBN 978-0-226-42322-7.
- Landau, Sarah; Condit, Carl W. (1996). Rise of the New York Skyscraper, 1865–1913. New Haven, CT: Yale University Press. ISBN 978-0-300-07739-1. OCLC 32819286.
- Schleier, Merill (1986). The Skyscraper in American Art, 1890–1931. New York: Da Capo Press. ISBN 0306803852.
- Solomonson, Katherine (2005). "The Chicago Tribune Tower Competition: Publicity Imagines Community". In Moudry, Roberta (ed.). The American Skyscraper: Cultural Histories. Cambridge: Cambridge University Press. ISBN 9780521624213.
- Willis, Carol (1995). Form Follows Finance: Skyscrapers and Skylines in New York and Chicago. New York: Princeton Architectural Press. ISBN 9781568980447.
- Wolner, Edward W. (2005). "Chicago's Fraternity Temples: the Origins of Skyscraper Rhetoric and the First of the World's Tallest Office Buildings". In Moudry, Roberta (ed.). The American Skyscraper: Cultural Histories. Cambridge: Cambridge University Press. ISBN 9780521624213.
