= Chicago Mercantile Exchange Center =

Office skyscrapers in Chicago, Illinois

Coordinates: 41.8812°N 87.6375°W

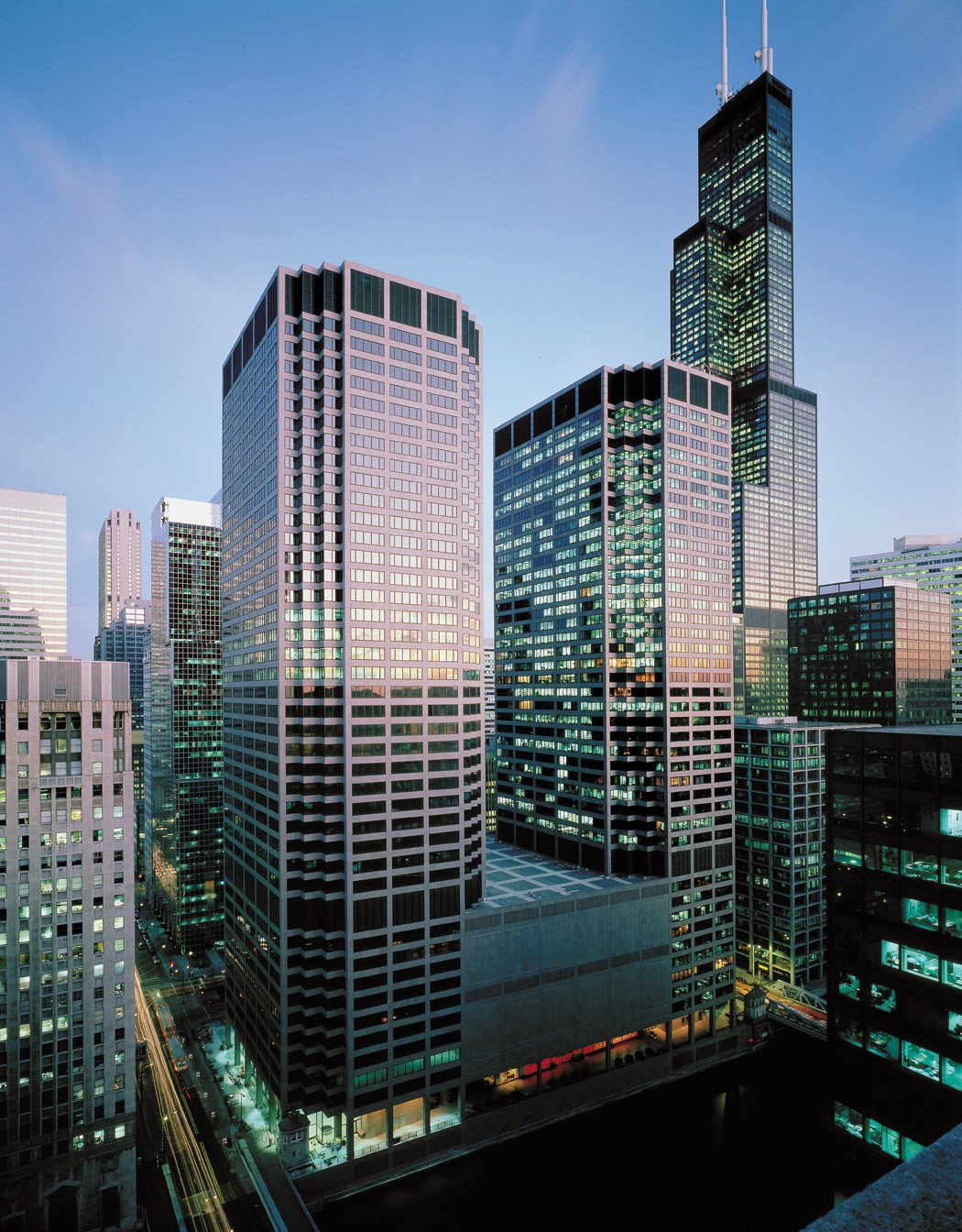
The Chicago Mercantile Exchange at 30 South Wacker

Chicago Mercantile Exchange Center is an office complex of two towers in Chicago, Illinois, US. They were completed in 1987 and have 40 floors. Fujikawa Johnson designed the buildings, which are the 87th tallest in Chicago. "The Merc" is also known by its address, 30 South Wacker. It is headquarters for the Chicago Mercantile Exchange

== Architecture and history ==
Completed in 1987, the 40-floor twin towers are joined at their first several floors by a city-block long podium containing a large trading floor.

The building contain over 2,300,000 square feet (210,000 m^{2}) of floorspace.

A 2020 lobby-level renovation altered the shape of the glass walls on its lower level to better-accommodate pedestrian patterns.

The building's ground level contains a promenade along the Chicago River, considered to be a component of a greater system of riverwalks along the river.

== See also ==
- List of tallest buildings in Chicago
