= The Columbian (Chicago) =

Skyscraper in Chicago, Illinois

- Interactive map of the The Columbian area

General information
- Type: Residential
- Location: 1160 South Michigan Avenue, Chicago, Illinois
- Coordinates: 41.8677°N 87.6246°W
- Construction started: 2005
- Completed: 2008

Height
- Roof: 517 ft (158 m)

Technical details
- Floor count: 47
- Lifts/elevators: 4

The Columbian is a 517-foot-tall (158 m) skyscraper in Chicago, Illinois, United States. It was constructed from 2005 to 2008 and has 47 floors, 225 units and four elevators. It is the tallest brick-clad building, and 108th tallest building, in Chicago.

== See also ==
- List of tallest buildings in Chicago
