= 200 South Wacker Drive =

Office skyscraper in Chicago, Illinois

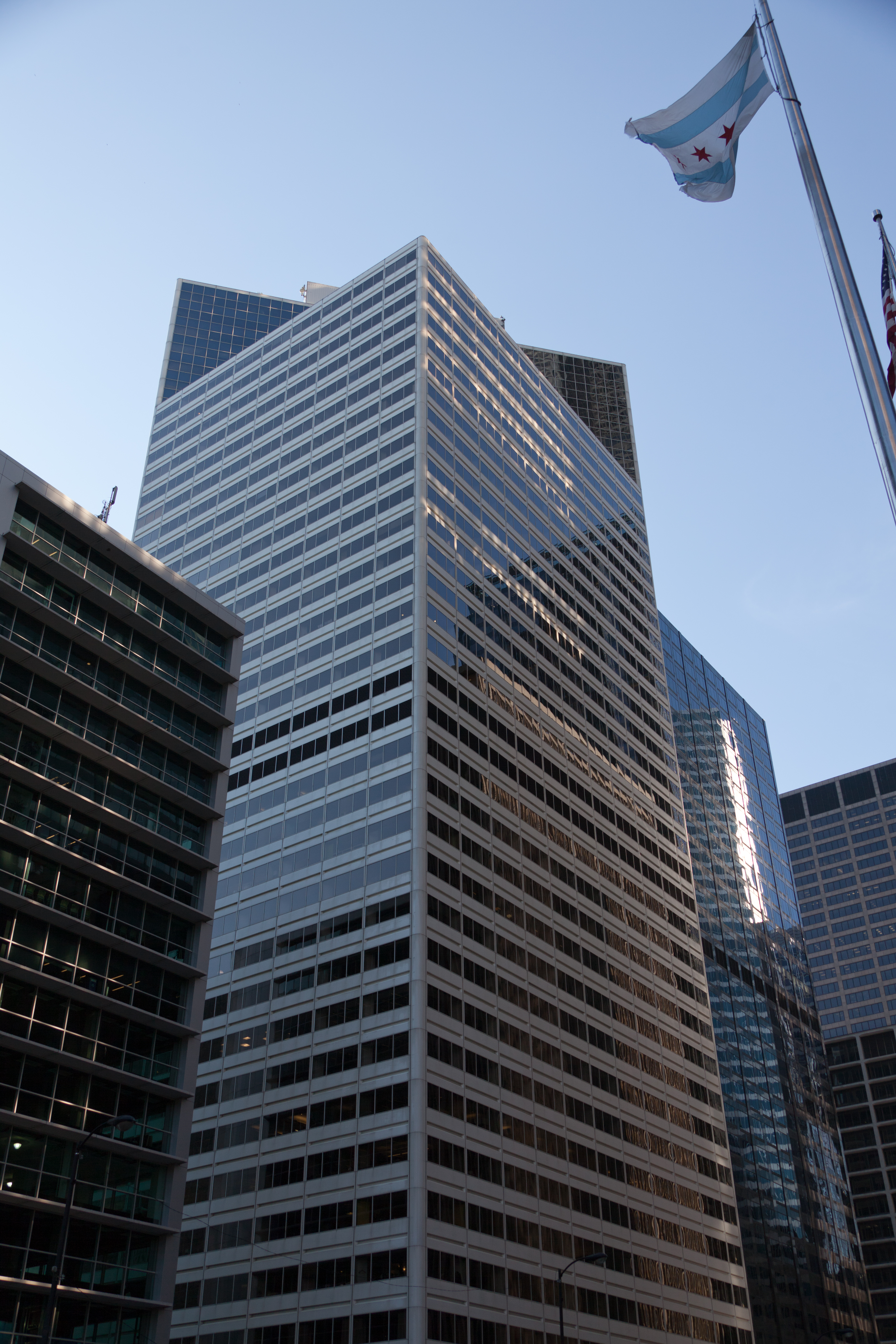
- Interactive map of the 200 South Wacker Drive area

General information
- Status: Completed
- Type: Office
- Location: 200 South Wacker Drive, Chicago, Illinois 60606
- Coordinates: 41.87904°N 87.63734°W
- Completed: 1981

Height
- Roof: 500 ft (152 m)

Technical details
- Floor count: 41

Design and construction
- Architect: Harry Weese Associates

200 South Wacker Drive is a high-rise office building located in Chicago, Illinois. Construction of the building began in 1979 and was completed in 1981. Harry Weese Associates designed the building, which has 41 stories and stands at a height of 500 ft (152m), making it the 92nd tallest building in Chicago.

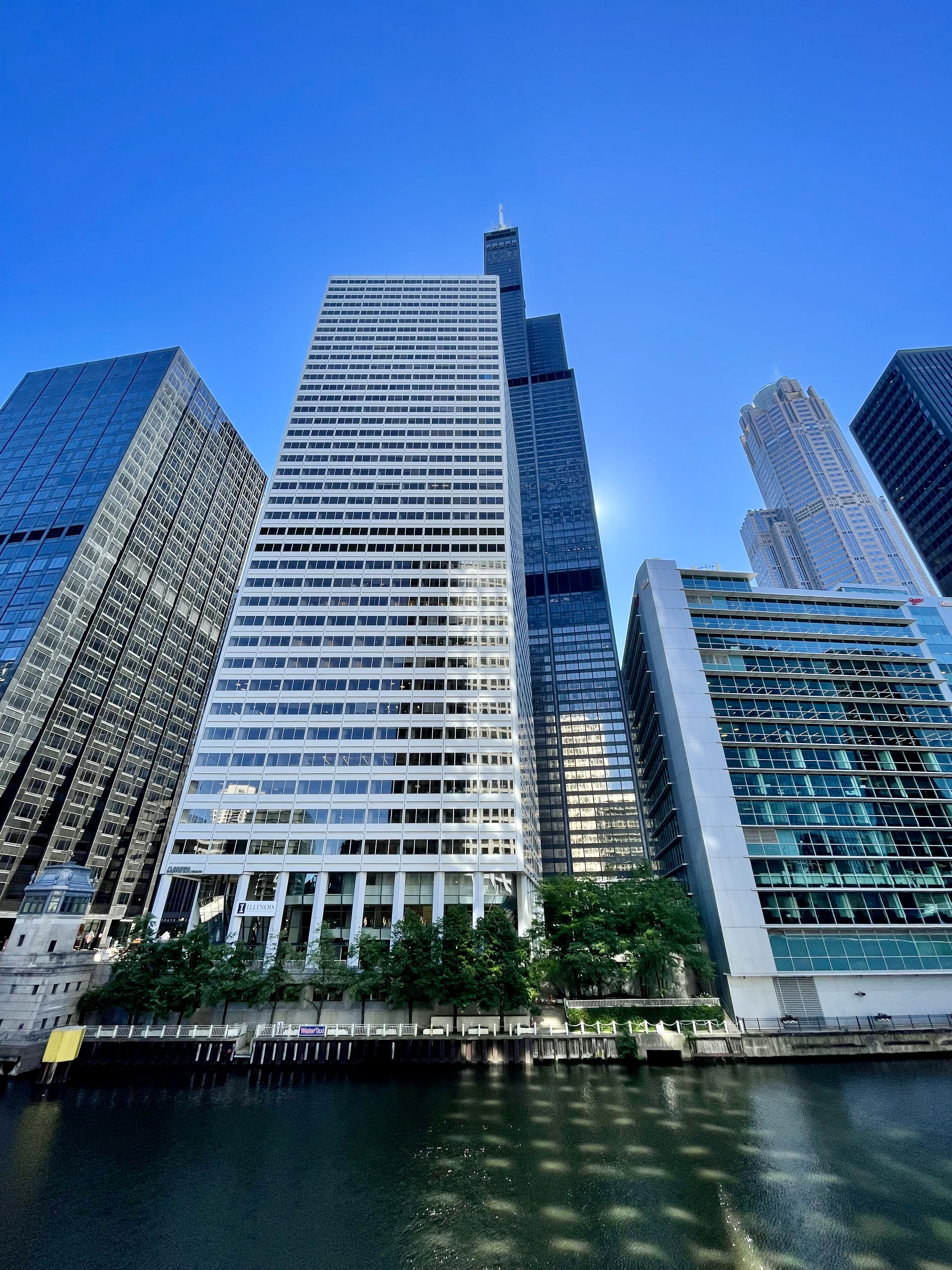
View from the west of 200 S. Wacker

== See also ==
- List of tallest buildings in Chicago
