= Mid-Continental Plaza =

Skyscraper in Chicago, Illinois

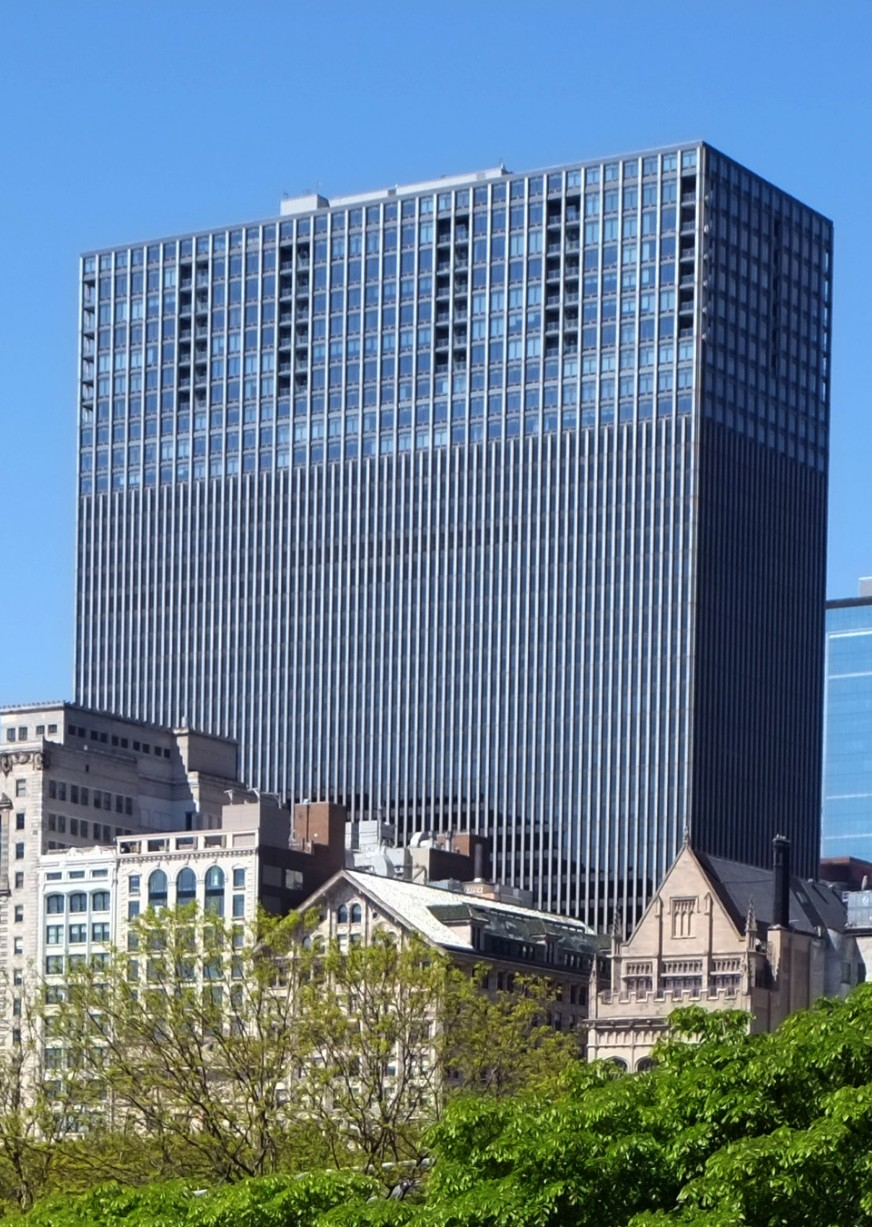
- Interactive map of the Mid-Continental Plaza area

General information
- Location: 55 East Monroe Street, Chicago, Illinois
- Coordinates: 41°52′48″N 87°37′32″W
- Completed: 1972

Height
- Roof: 583 ft (178 m)

Technical details
- Floor count: 49

Design and construction
- Architects: Shaw and Associates

Mid-Continental Plaza is a 583 ft (178m) tall skyscraper in Chicago, Illinois. It was completed in 1972 and has 49 floors. Shaw and Associates designed the building, which is the 66th tallest building in Chicago. It was originally planned as two 40-story black glass towers. The top 10 floors have been converted to condominiums called The Park Monroe.

== See also ==
- List of tallest buildings in Chicago

== Position in Chicago's skyline ==
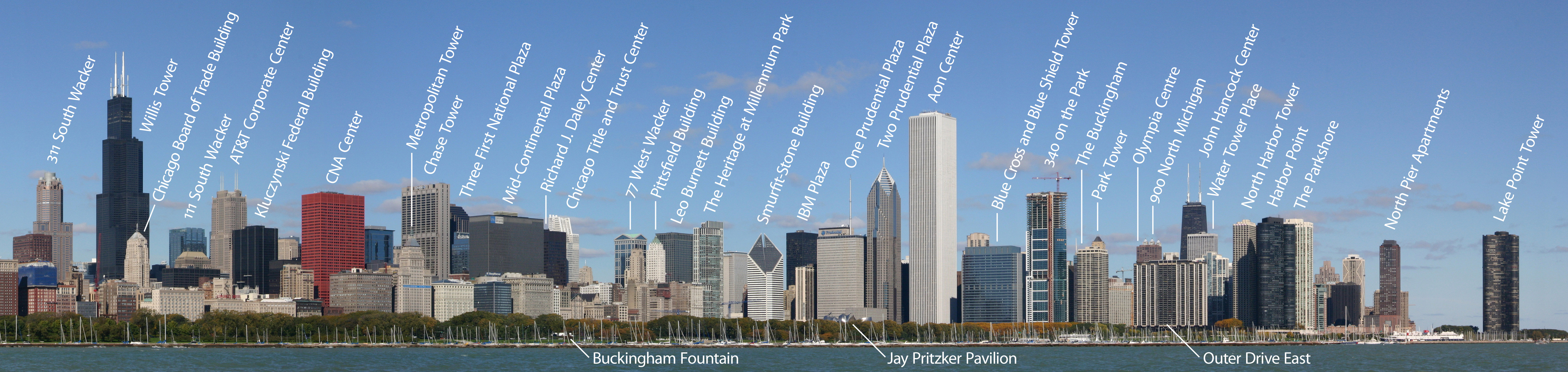
