= 401 East Ontario =

Skyscraper in Chicago, Illinois

- Interactive map of the 401 East Ontario area

General information
- Type: Residential
- Location: 401 East Ontario Street, Chicago, Illinois
- Coordinates: 41.8933°N 87.6169°W
- Completed: 1990

Height
- Roof: 515 ft (157 m)

Technical details
- Floor count: 51

401 East Ontario is a 515 ft (157m) tall skyscraper in Chicago, Illinois. It was completed in 1990 and has 51 floors. It is tied with One Financial Place as the 78th tallest building in Chicago.

== See also ==
- List of tallest buildings in Chicago
