= Gibsons Italia =

Steakhouse in Chicago, Illinois, US

Gibsons Italia is a steakhouse in River North, Chicago. It has consistently ranked on the World's 101 Best Steak Restaurants list. Its sister restaurant, Gibsons Bar & Steakhouse on Rush Street, is Chicago's top-grossing independent restaurant. Gibsons Restaurant Group is unique in having its own USDA certification. In 2025 Gibsons Italia was listed as the #42 best steak restaurant in the US by the 101 Best Steak Restaurants.
