= Gibsons Bar & Steakhouse =

Coordinates: 41°54′5″N 87°37′41″W

Gibsons Bar & Steakhouse is a steakhouse on Rush Street in River North, Chicago. It has consistently ranked on the World's 101 Best Steak Restaurants list. Gibsons Bar & Steakhouse is Chicago's top-grossing independent restaurant. Gibsons Restaurant Group is unique in having its own USDA certification.

Its sister restaurant, Gibsons Italia, was listed as the #42 best steak restaurant in the US by the 2025 101 Best Steak Restaurants.
