= Ekkehard Knobelspies =

German entrepreneur, author and consultant (born 1967)

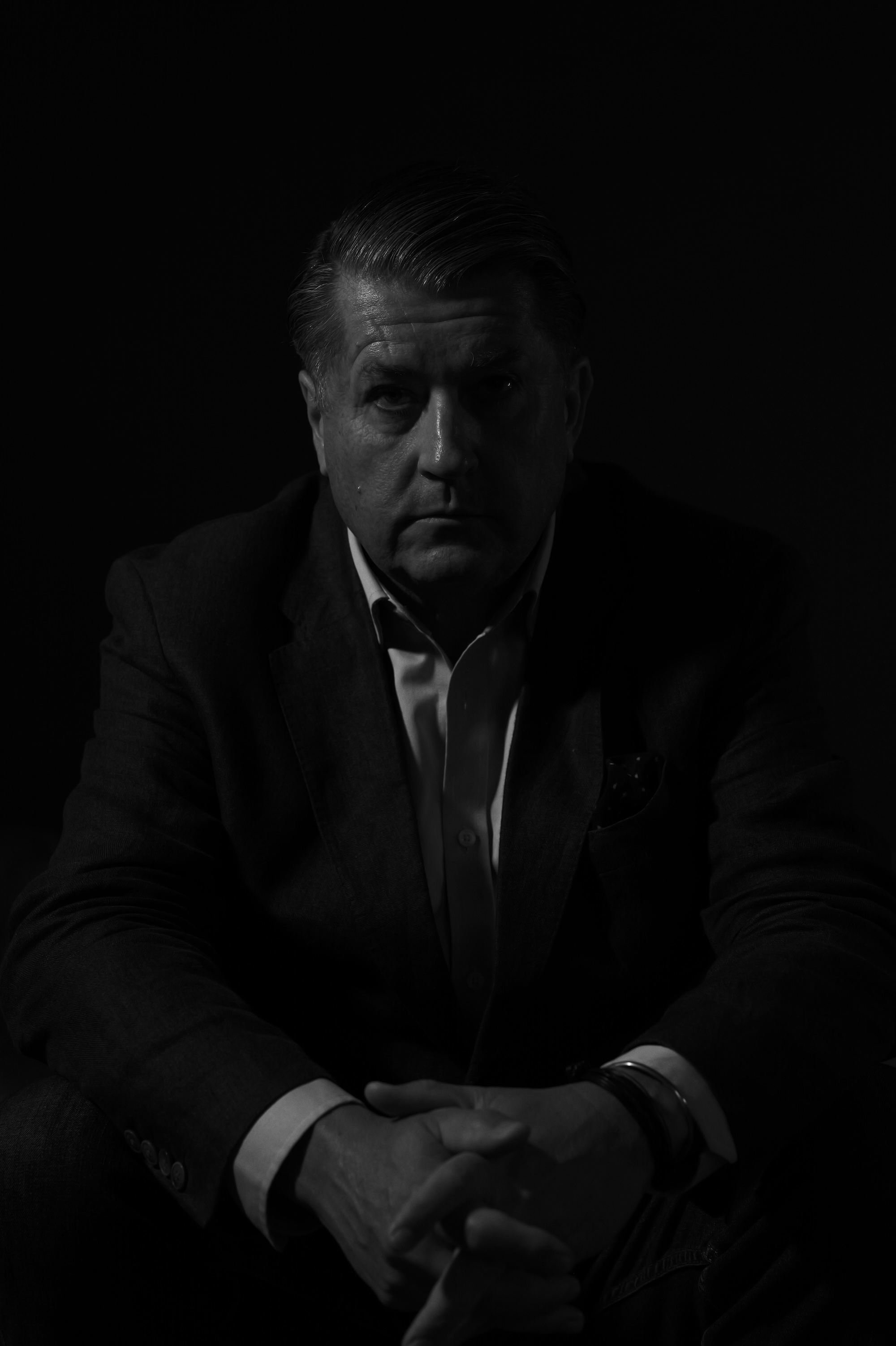
- Portrait of Knobelspies
- Born: Ekkehard Franz Knobelspies; July 10, 1967 (age 59); Konstanz, Germany
- Education: Studied languages
- Alma mater: Houston Baptist University
- Occupations: Entrepreneur, Consultant
- Known for: Founder of the World's 101 Best Steak Restaurants
- Spouse: Margarete Knobelspies (née Pohlig)
- Website: www.worldbeststeaks.com

Ekkehard Franz Knobelspies (born July 10, 1967) is a German entrepreneur, author and consultant, best known for founding the annual ranking of the World's 101 Best Steak Restaurants.

== Early life ==
Knobelspies was born in Konstanz, Germany, and grew up in Radolfzell near Lake Constance, in a conservative, Catholic, entrepreneurial, and sports-oriented family. He is related to the captain of industry August Kratt and Barbara "Bobo" Rockefeller. He married Margarete Knobelspies (née Pohlig), great-great-granddaughter of Julius Pohlig, a renowned cable car engineer.

Knobelspies played competitive tennis in his youth, training under notable coaches including Nick Bollettieri and Harry Hopman. He achieved notable rankings in the Baden Youth Championships and German International Championships (Sport Scheck Youth Cup), and competed against future tennis champions Boris Becker and Thomas Muster.

He studied languages in Paris and Valencia, attended Houston Baptist University in Texas via a tennis exchange program, and completed military service in Pfullendorf, Germany.

== Career ==
Knobelspies started his professional journey in hospitality, training at the InterContinental Hotel Düsseldorf and later becoming Sales Director at Excelsior Hotel Ernst in Cologne. He transitioned into brand communications, working for corporations such as Mercedes-Benz, Deutsche Bank, and Coca-Cola.

In London, he became Director of Central Europe for a WPP Group agency, managing accounts including HSBC, Allianz, Jaguar Land Rover, and British Airways.

Between 1998 and 2008, Knobelspies served as managing director of various international brand communications companies in Zurich, Berlin, Frankfurt, Munich, and Cape Town.

He founded and remains the non-executive director of the "World's 101 Best Steak Restaurants". His consultancy focuses on clients in real estate, hospitality, food and beverage sectors, including notable individuals such as Countess Heidi Horten, Alexander Chesterman, and Naomi Campbell. He is currently working on a book about the World’s 101 Best Steak Restaurants, which will be released worldwide in 2026.

== Personal life ==
Knobelspies actively promotes conservation and biodiversity, advocating for the preservation of endangered livestock breeds. He resides with his family in London and the South of France.
