= Rush Street (Chicago) =

Street in Chicago, Illinois

Coordinates: 41°53′32″N 87°37′31″W

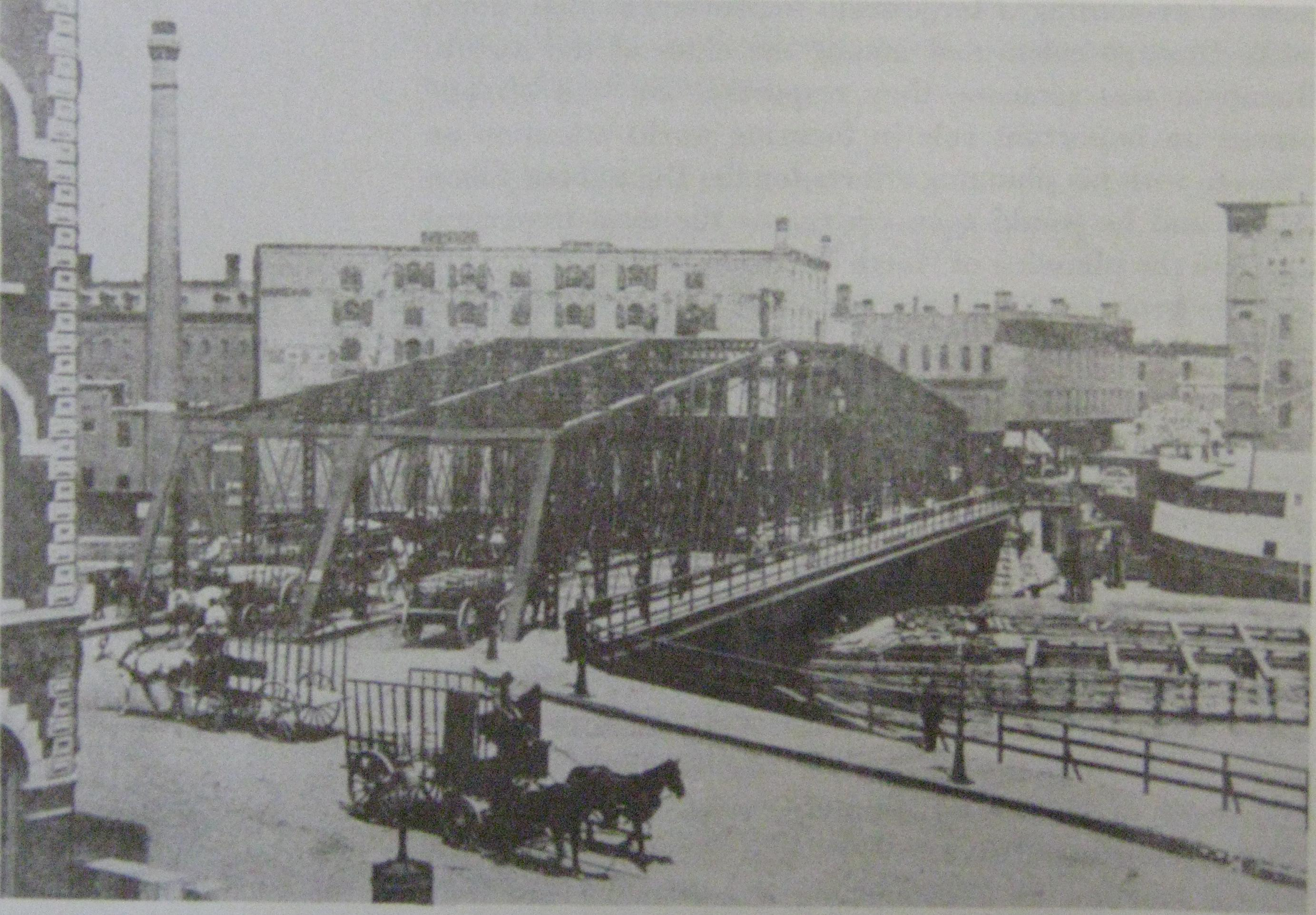
Rush Street Bridge (1890)

- Maintained by: Department of Streets & Sanitation
- South end: 401 North at Kinzie/Water Streets (65 East)
- Major junctions: Chicago Avenue (800 North) Ohio St./Ontario St. (east/westbound) from/to Kennedy Expressway I-90 / I-94
- North end: 1138 North at Cedar and State Streets (0 East)

Rush Street is a one-way street in the Near North Side community area of Chicago in Cook County, Illinois, United States. The street, which starts at the Chicago River between Wabash and North Michigan Avenues, runs directly north until it slants on a diagonal as it crosses Chicago Avenue then it continues to Cedar and State Streets, making it slightly less than a mile long. One lane also runs southbound from Ohio Street (600N) to Kinzie Street (400N) as part of a two-way street segment. It runs parallel to and one block west of the Magnificent Mile on the two-way traffic North Michigan Avenue, which runs at 100 east up to 950 north. The street, which is also one block east of the one-way southbound Wabash Avenue, formerly ran slightly further south to the Chicago River where over time various bridges connected it to the Loop, Chicago's central business district.

Rush Street's history traces back to the original incorporation of the city in the 1830s. It has since hosted important residences, such as the house of the first Mayor of Chicago, and significant commerce. Today, it continues to run through some of the wealthiest neighborhoods in the country and has businesses that correspond to the demands of its residents. The neighborhood hosts highly rated restaurants, five-star hotels, and four-star spas. The street, which was named after Declaration of Independence signator Benjamin Rush, was once known for its nightlife, especially at the northern end, which features entertainment that attracts locals and visitors. During the 1960s and 1970s, it was the most vibrant nightlife entertainment destination in the country outside of Las Vegas, with major stars like Tony Bennett, Frank Sinatra, Barry Manilow. Bette Midler, Oscar Peterson, to name a few, along with some of the greatest groups to hail from the city of Chicago. By the 1980s many of these establishments shuttered. Today, the street has emerged into an overflow of Oak Street with luxury shopping lining the streets from Barney's to Bugatti. The southern end of the street was an integral part of the city as a main river crossing at various incarnations of the Rush Street Bridge across the main branch of the Chicago River from the mid-19th century until the 1920s. The Rush Street Bridges have a rich cultural history, which includes both a prominent role in facilitating vehicular land traffic and a prominent role as a commercial port location. However, commerce on the Chicago River has declined since the 1930s and the Michigan Avenue Bridge has taken over the role as the primary river crossing for this neighborhood.

== Background ==
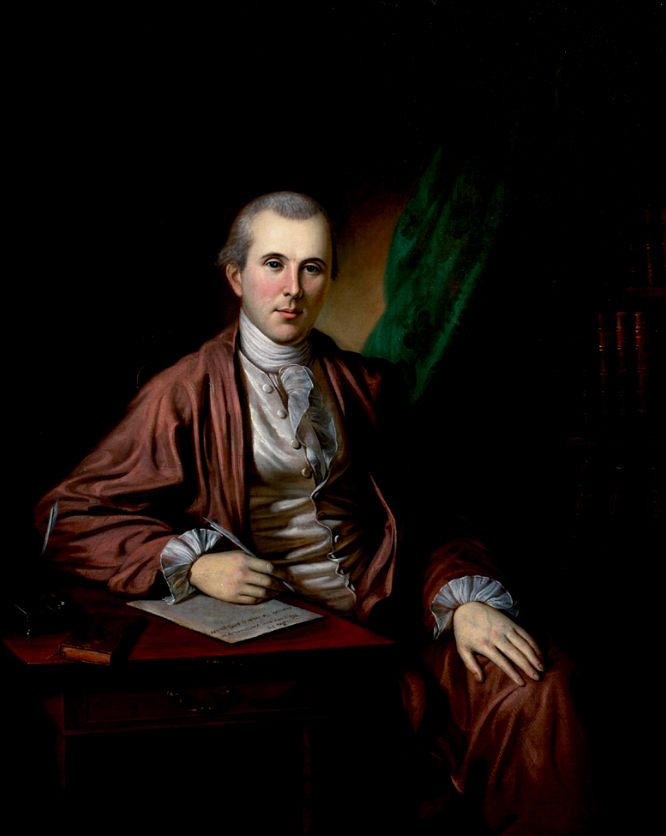
Benjamin Rush by Charles Willson Peale, 1783

Rush Street was named after Benjamin Rush, one of the four physician signators of the United States Declaration of Independence. Other places named after Rush in Chicago are Rush Medical College and Rush-Presbyterian-St. Luke's Medical Center.

As part of the original incorporated city of Chicago in 1837, Rush Street is one of the city's oldest thoroughfares. Like Clark Street, parts of Rush Street roughly follow the path of an Indian trail called Green Bay trail (later Green Bay Road) that ran to Green Bay, Wisconsin. Early Rush Street was commonly agreed to be desirable place of residence, and hosted the first house designed by an architect in Chicago (designed for the first Mayor of Chicago William Ogden by John M. Van Osdel). The house, bounded by Erie, Ontario, Rush and Cass (now Wabash Avenue) Streets, did not survive the Great Chicago Fire of 1871.

After the Great Chicago Fire, the Near North Side became a refuge for many due to its wide streets, high ground, good drainage, and proximity to both the Lake Michigan lakeshore and Lincoln Park. Cyrus McCormick built a mansion at 675 Rush Street between 1875 and 1879. The mansion, located at the corner of Rush and Erie, lured so many relatives to move nearby that the neighborhood became known as "McCormickville" by the 1880s. The street subsequently hosted elite Chicago socialites. Cyrus' brother Leander J. McCormick built the Virginia Hotel at the northwest corner of Rush and Ohio. Opening just a few years before the 1893 World's Columbian Exposition, the 400-room hotel was advertised as "an absolutely fire-proof building and a finished hotel second to no other." The hotel featured ornate granite interiors decorated with marble statues, separate "gentlemen's smoking room" and "ladies dining room", and a room of boilers and dynamos to offer the latest technology: electric lights. Well into the 20th century, residential buildings faced Rush Street until the demands of the expanding commerce—especially concentrations of restaurants and night clubs—consumed its real estate.

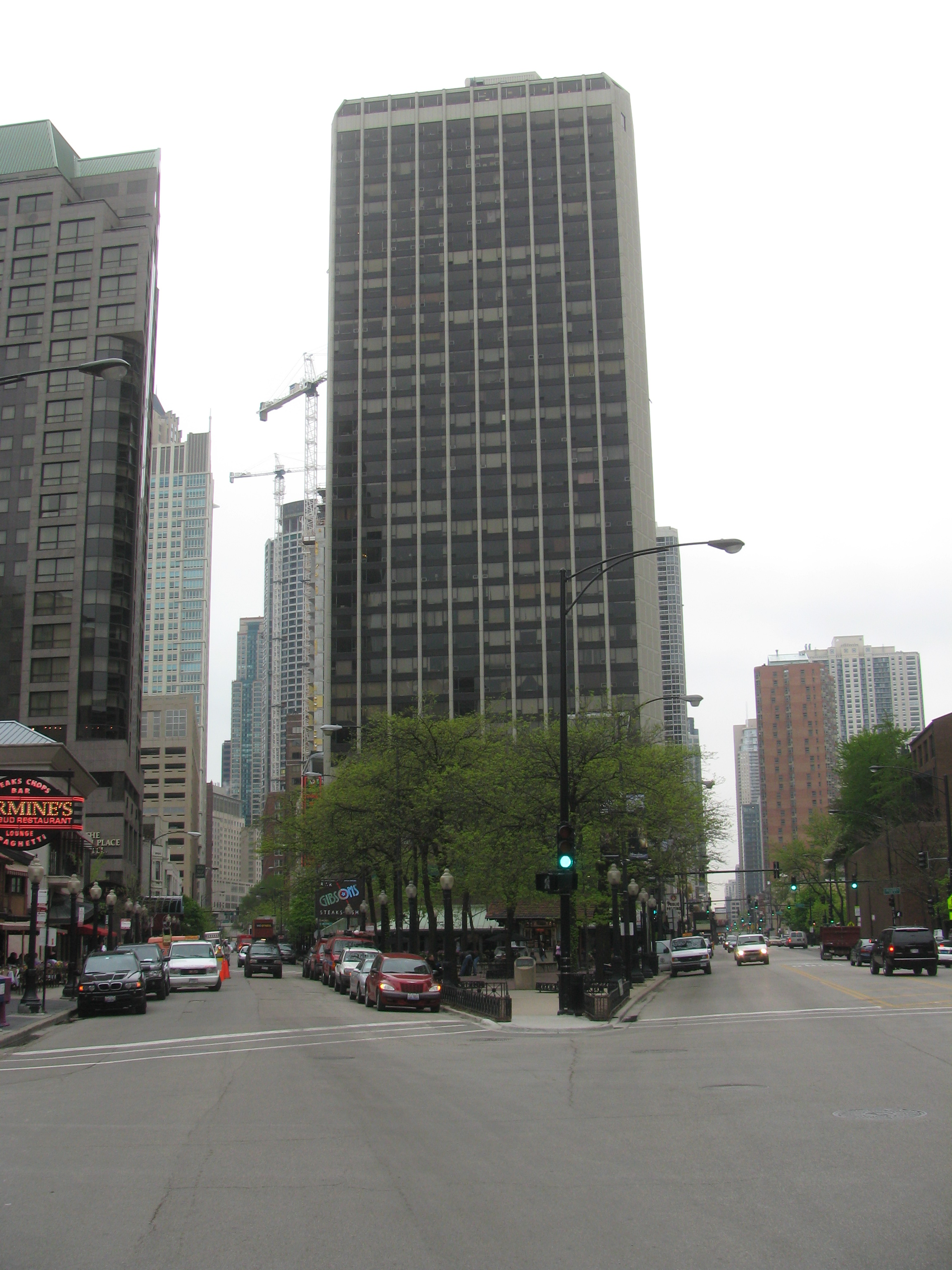
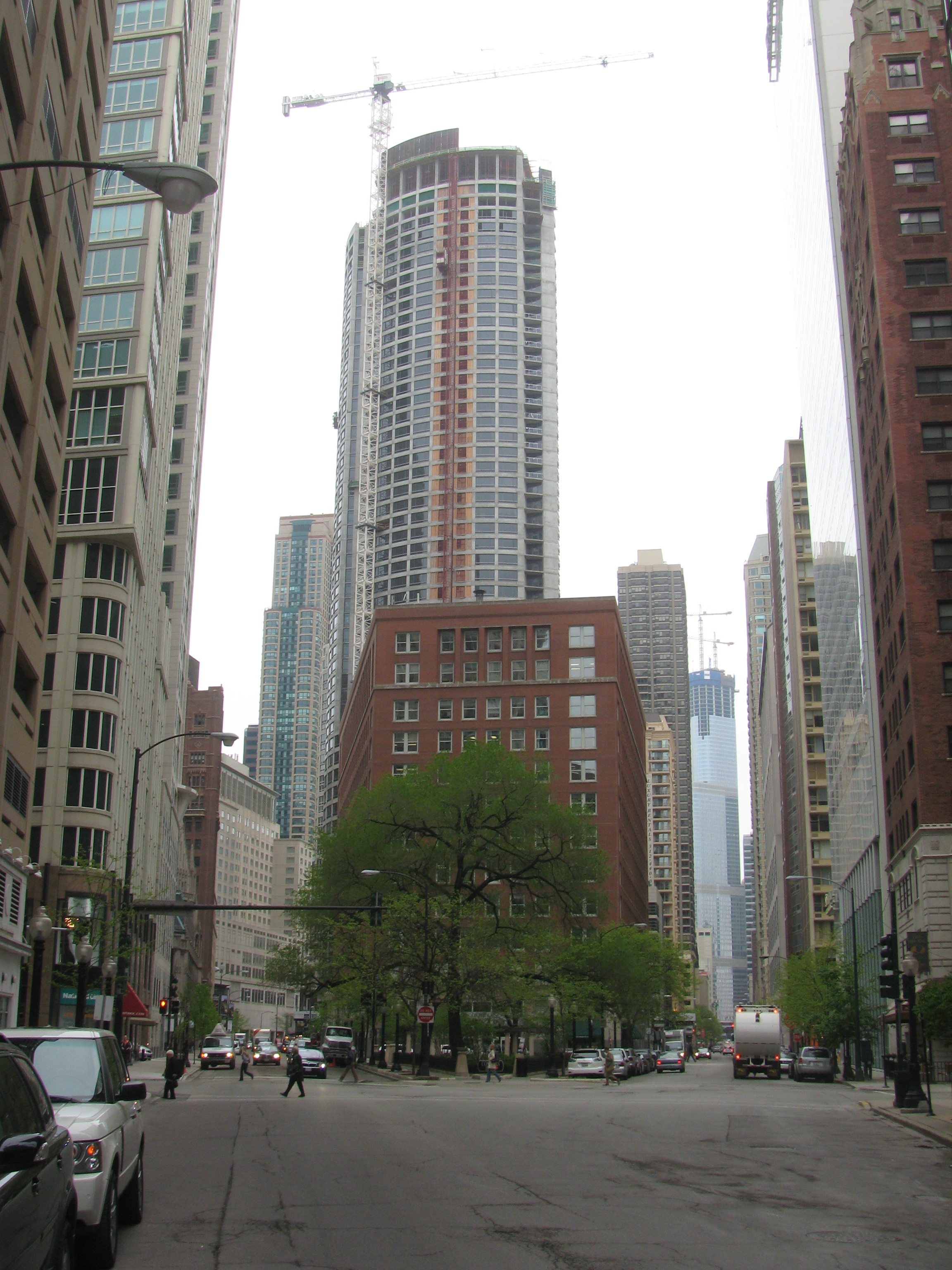
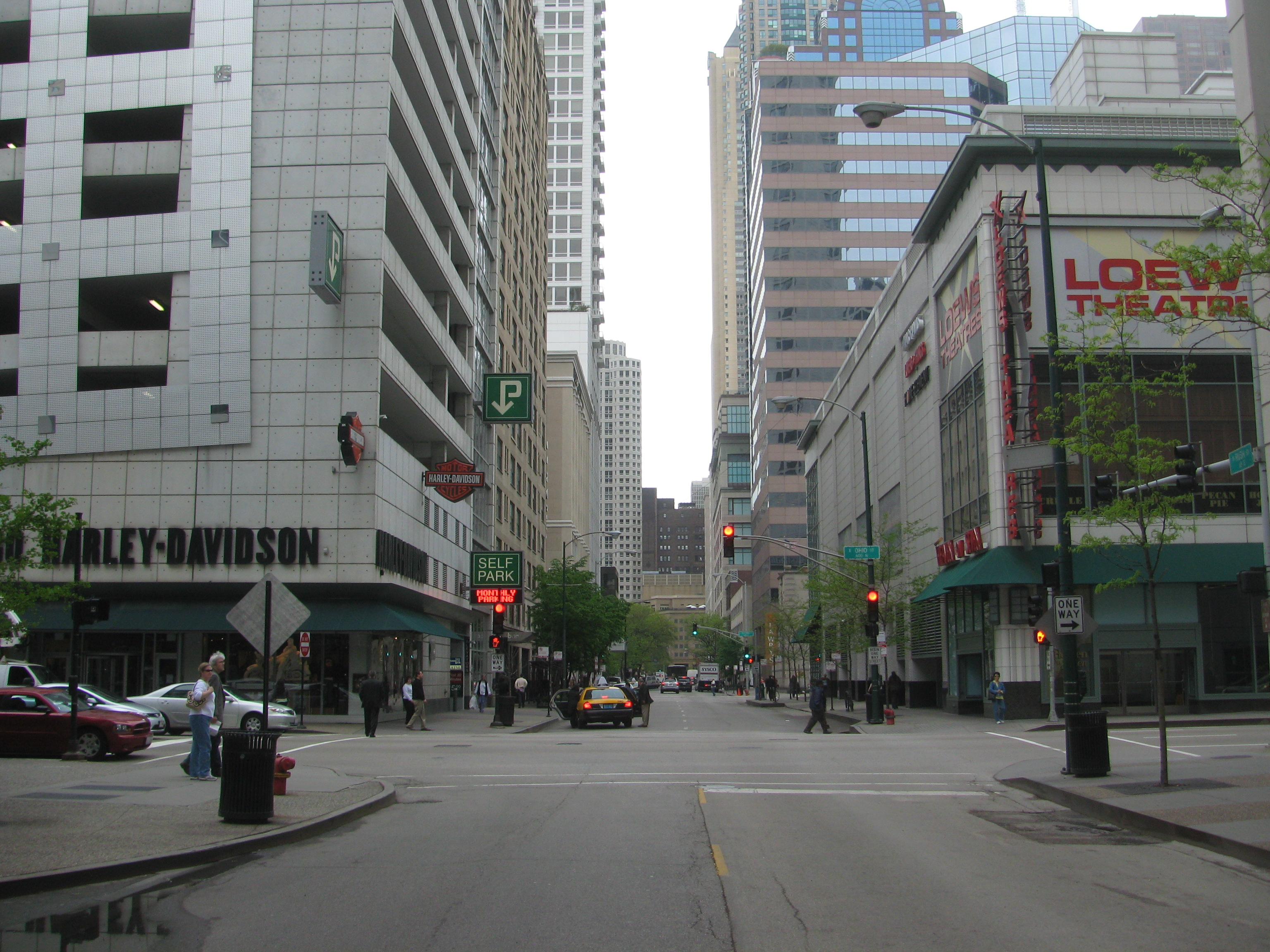
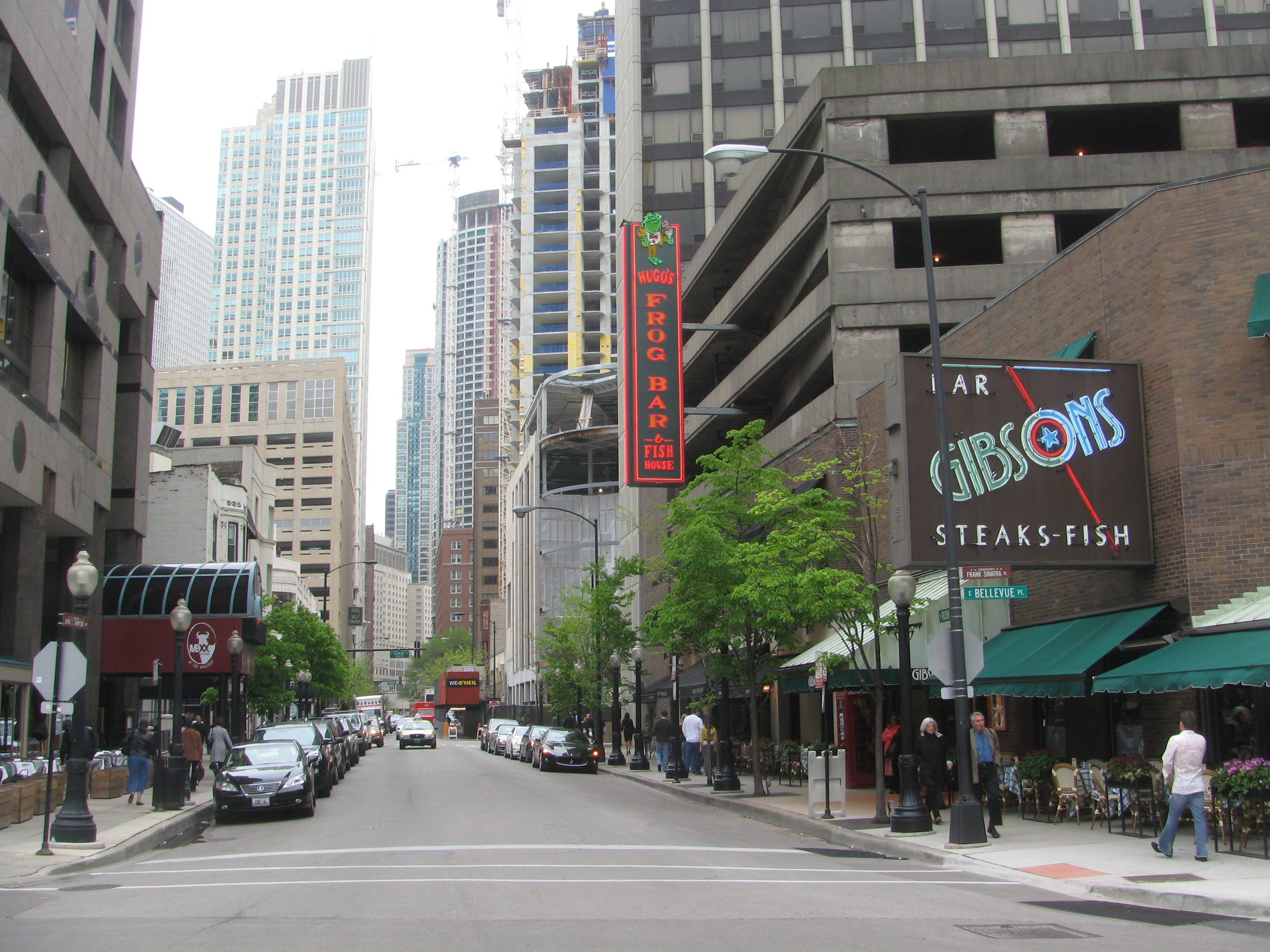
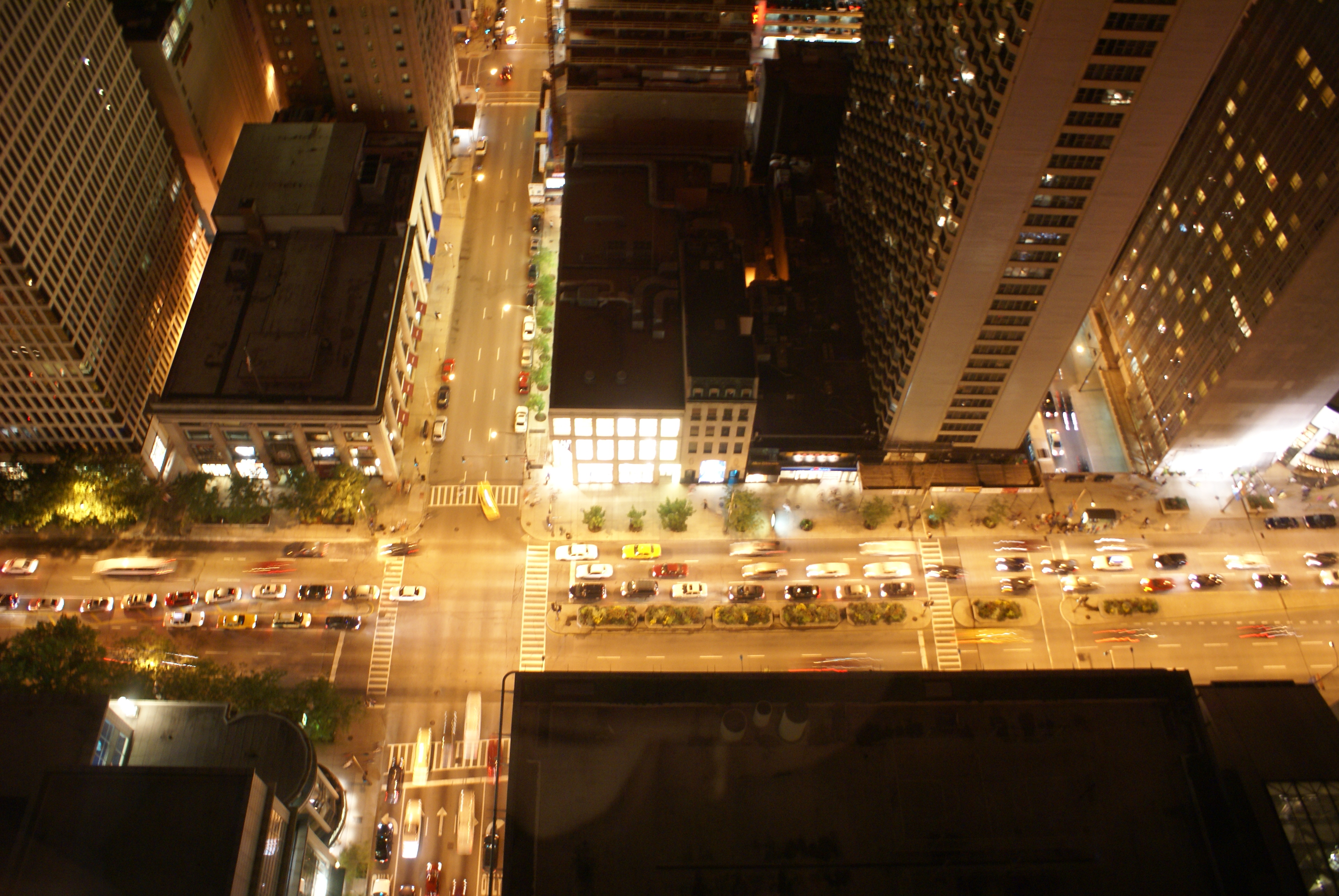
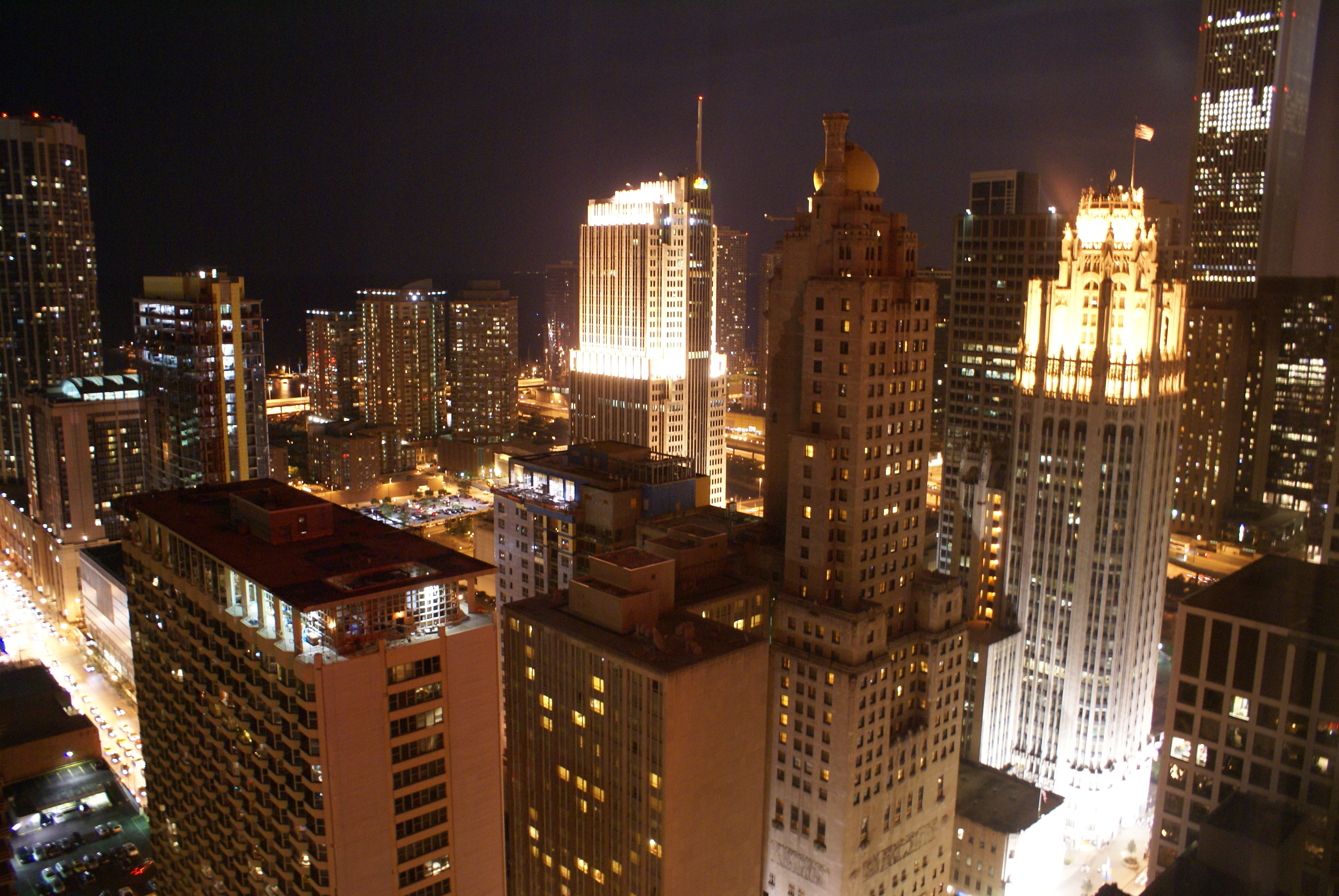
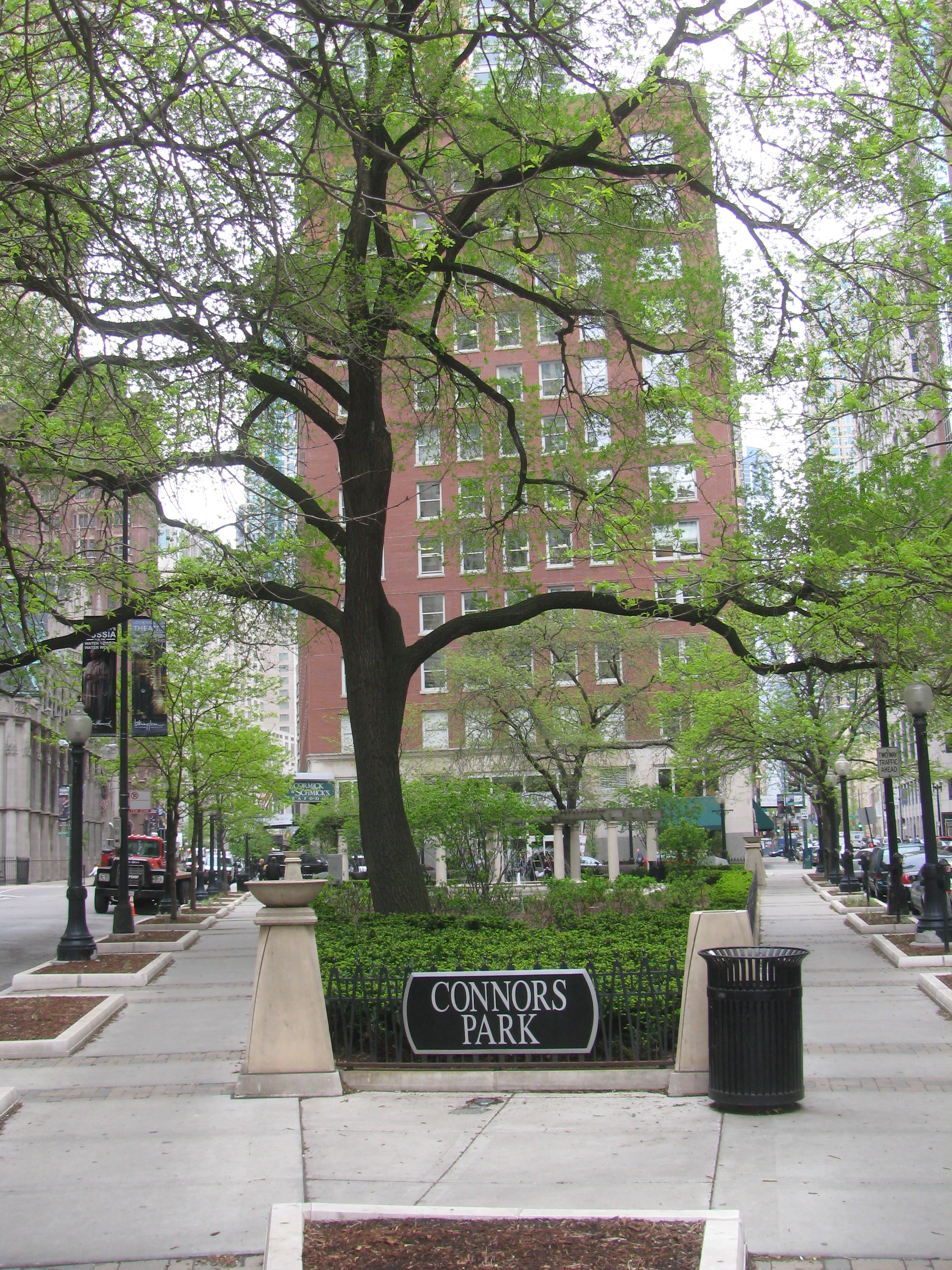
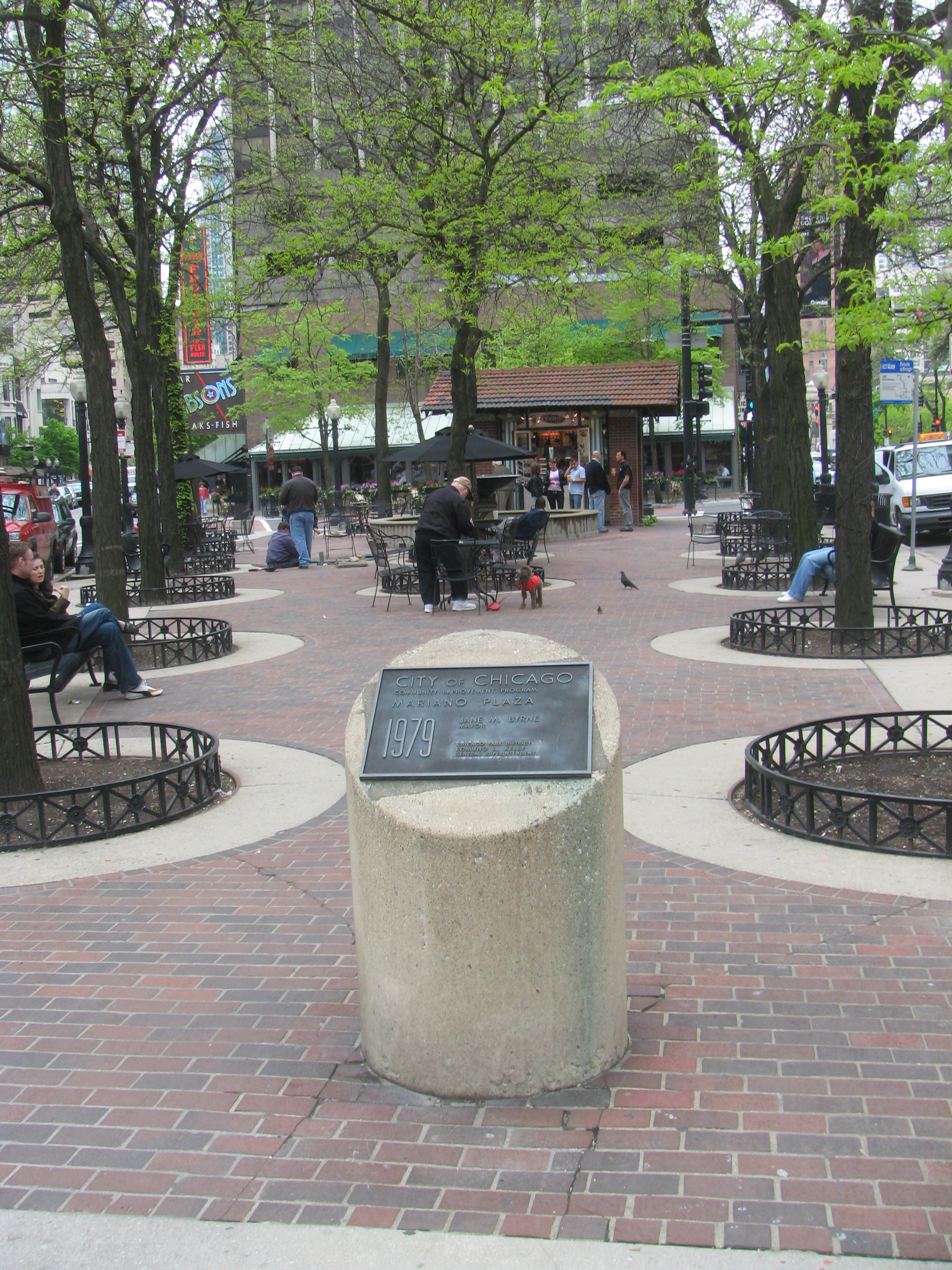
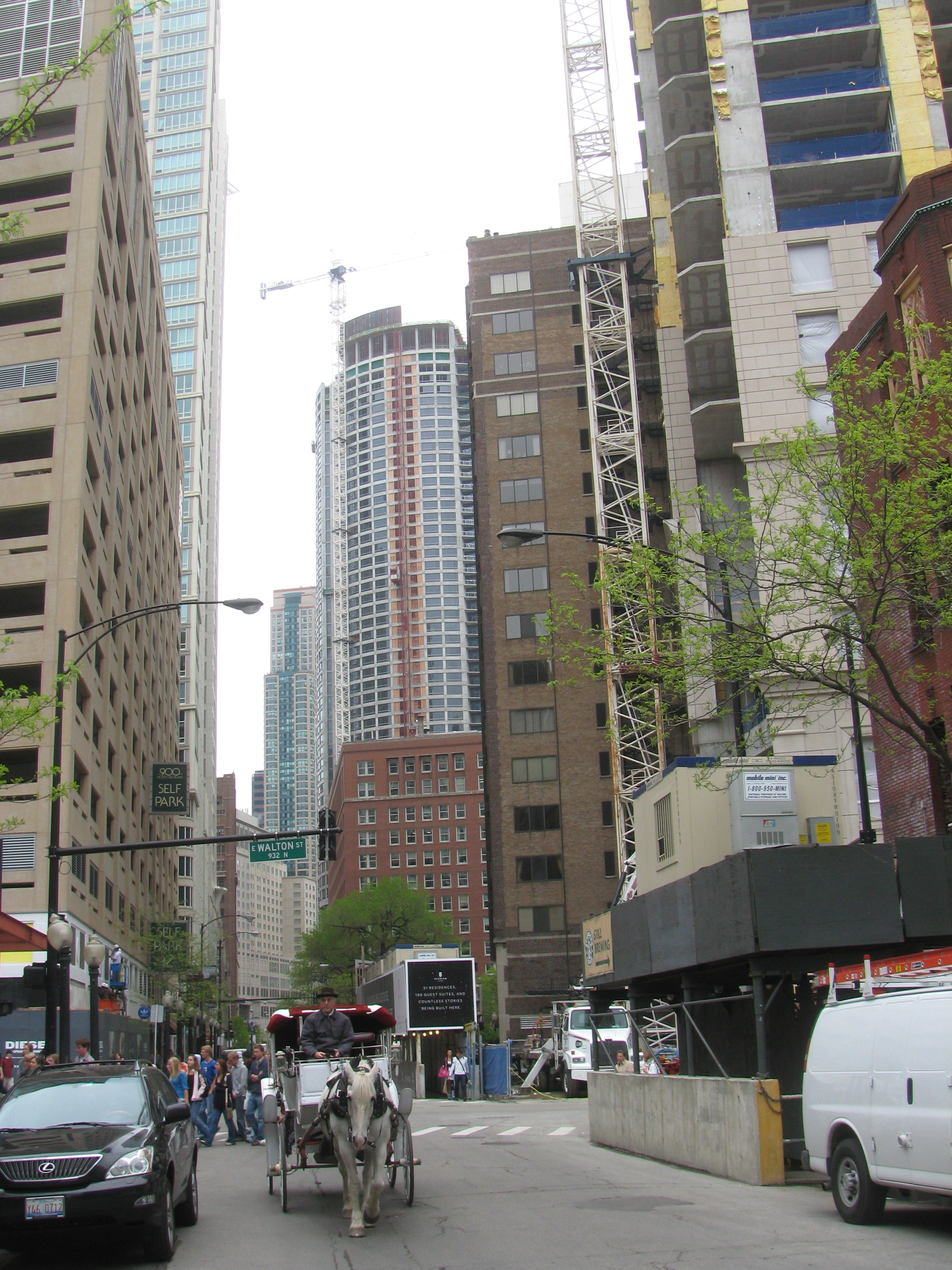
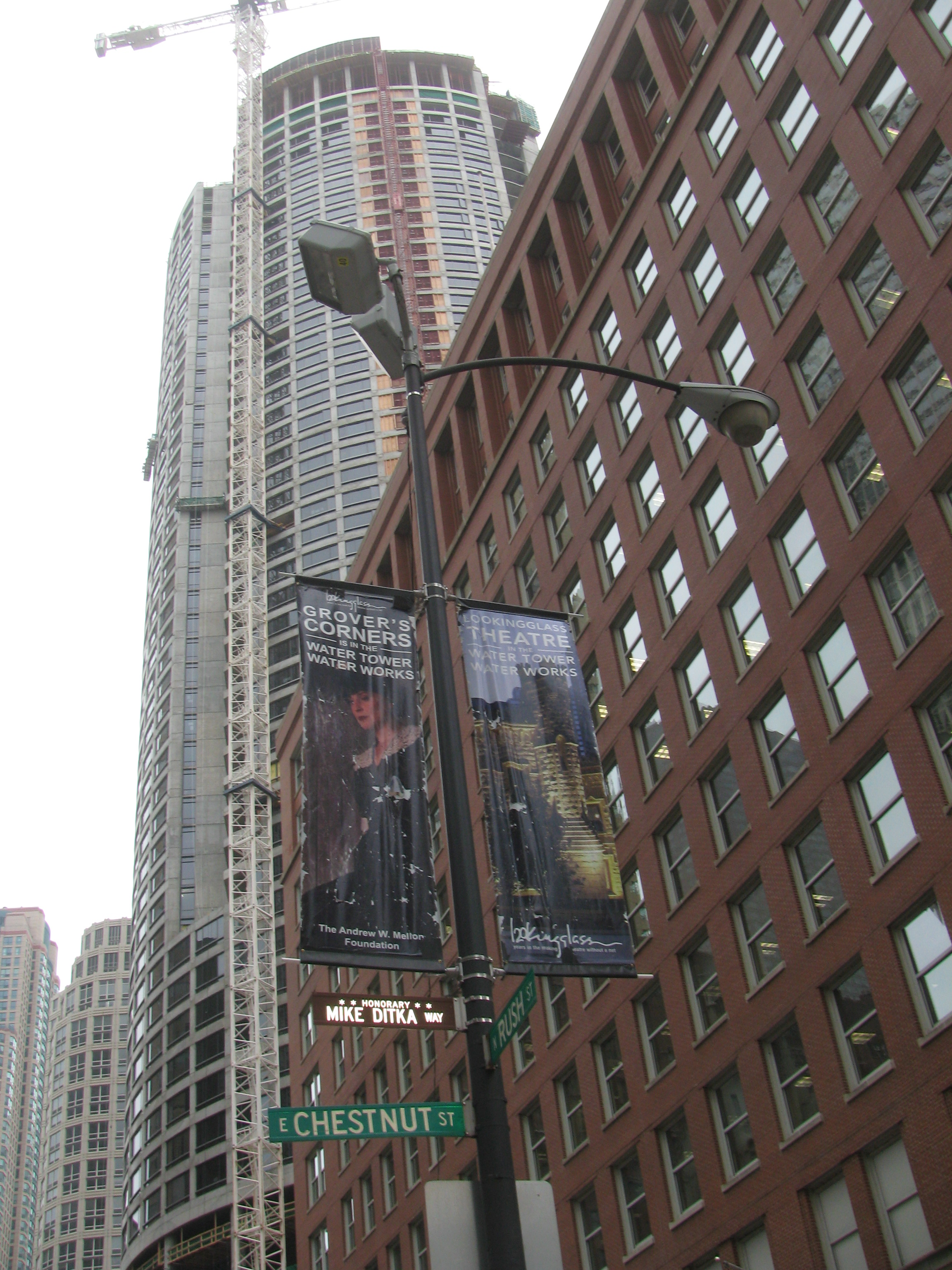
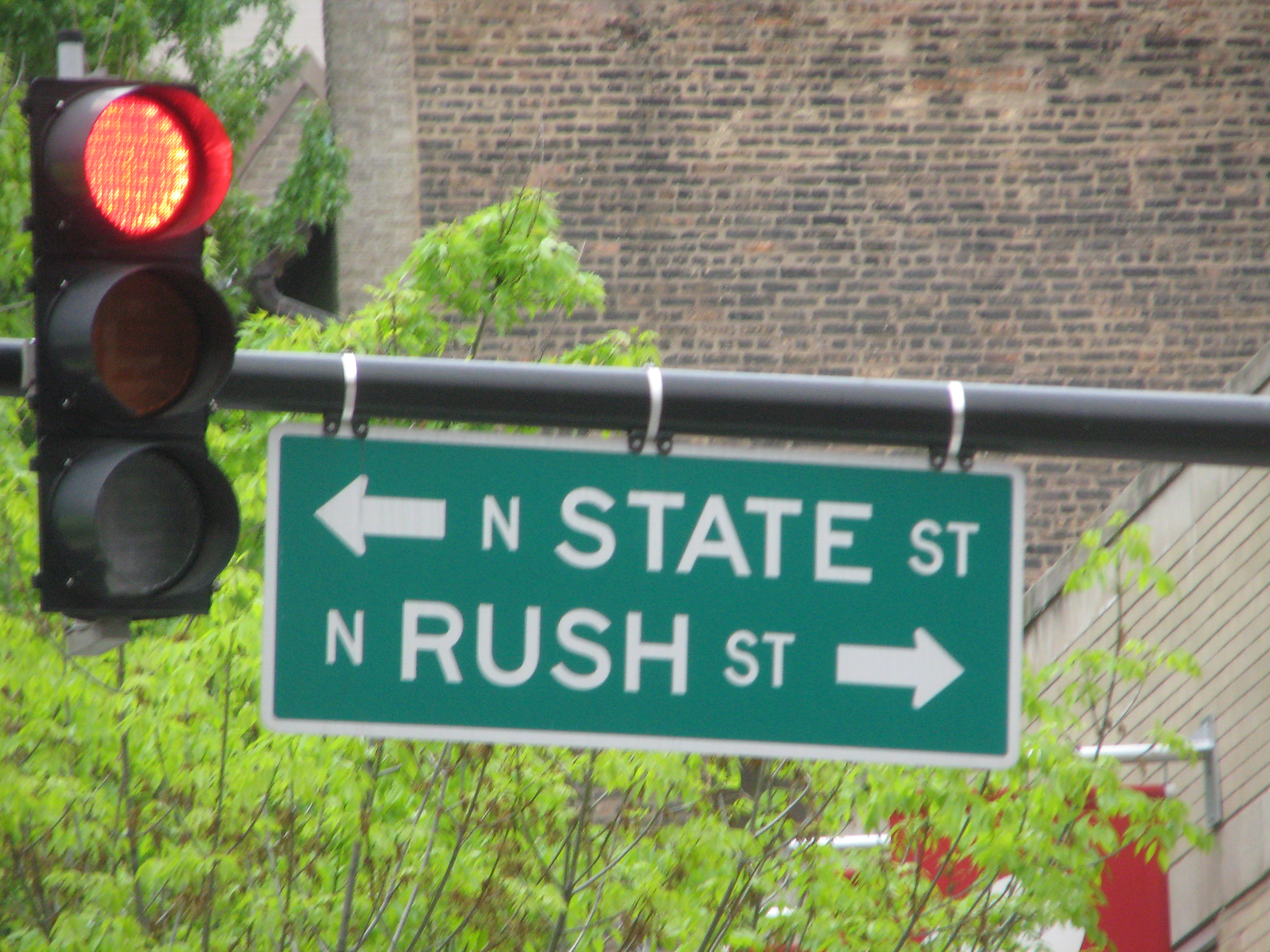
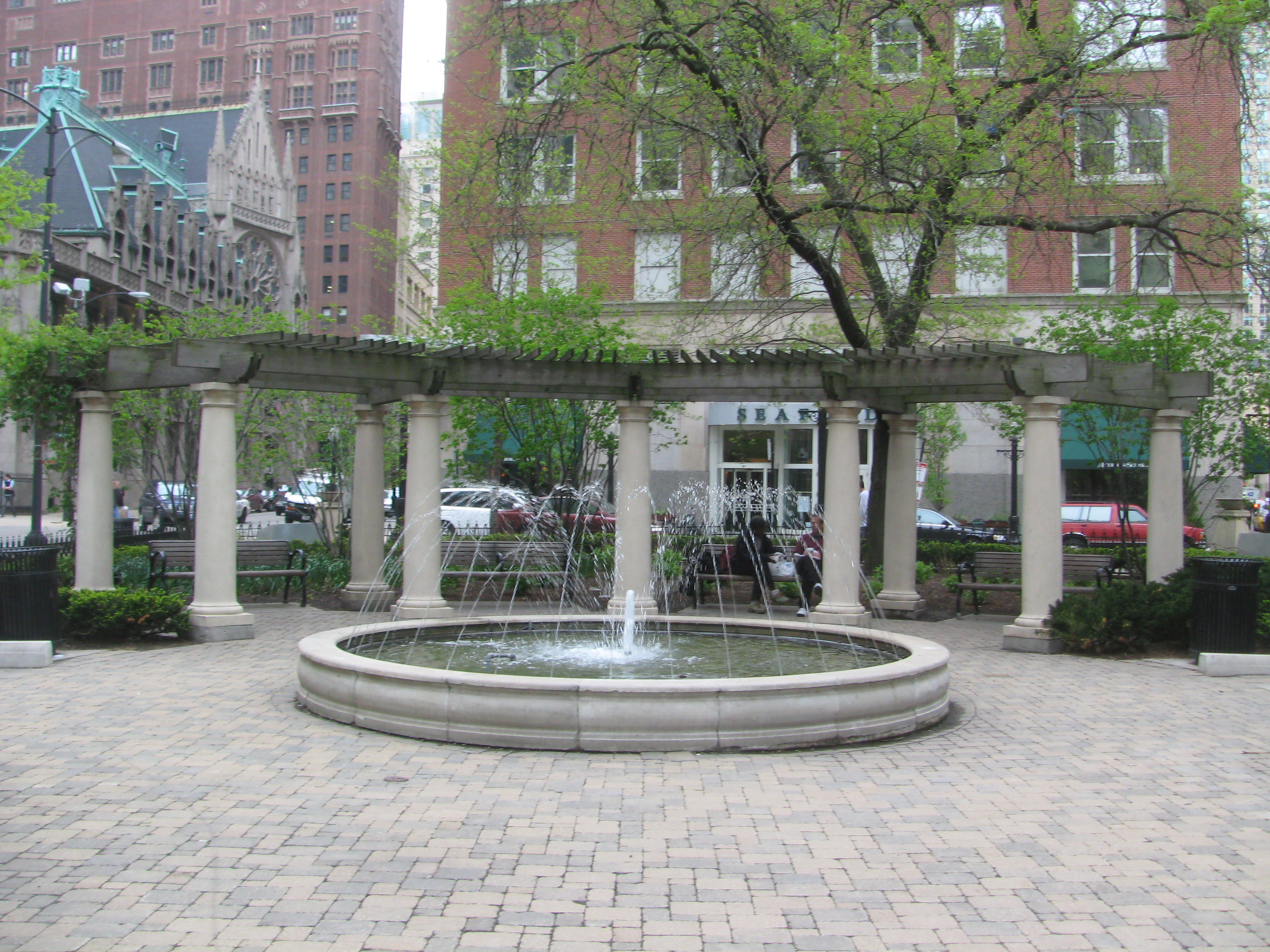
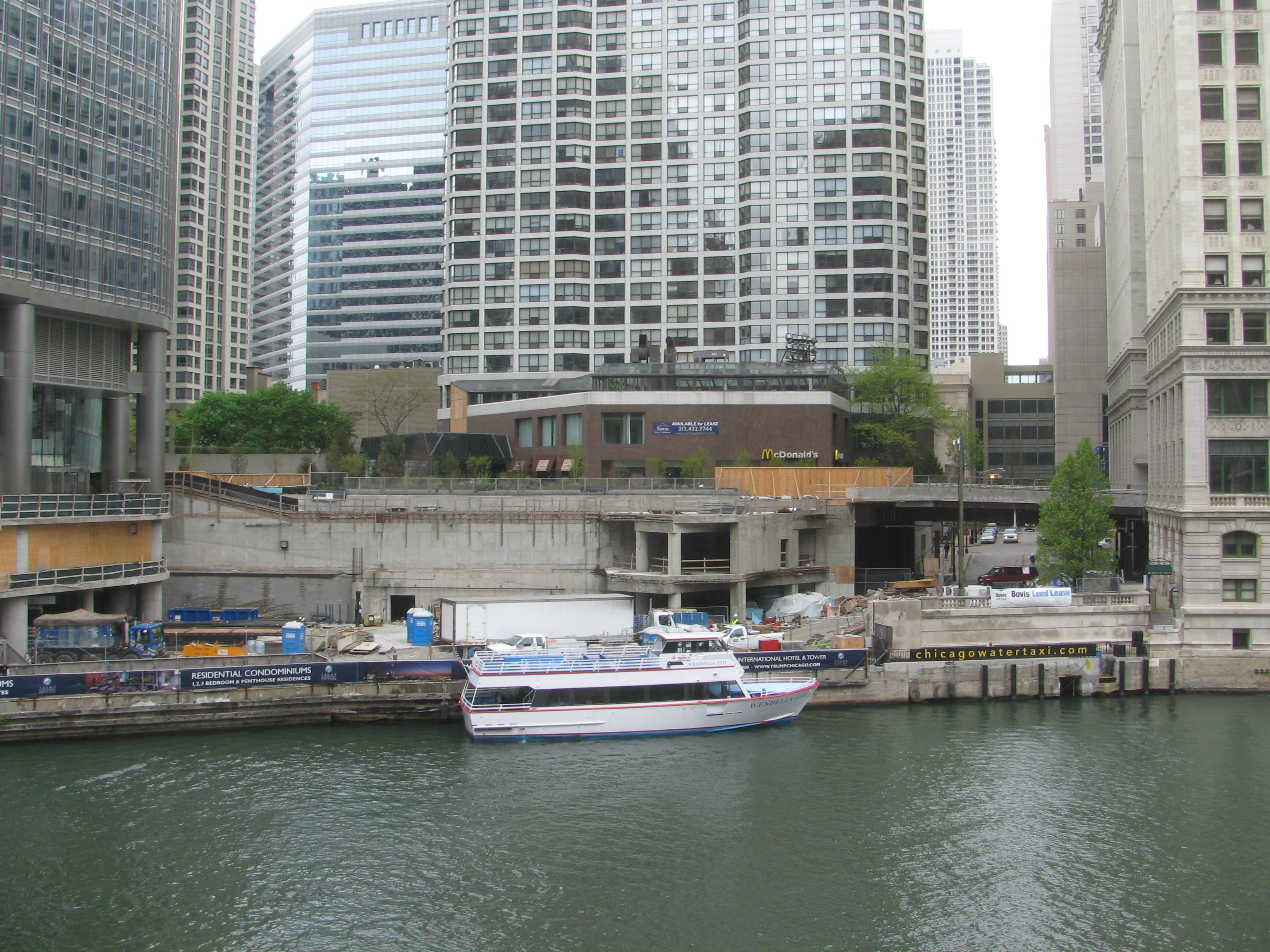
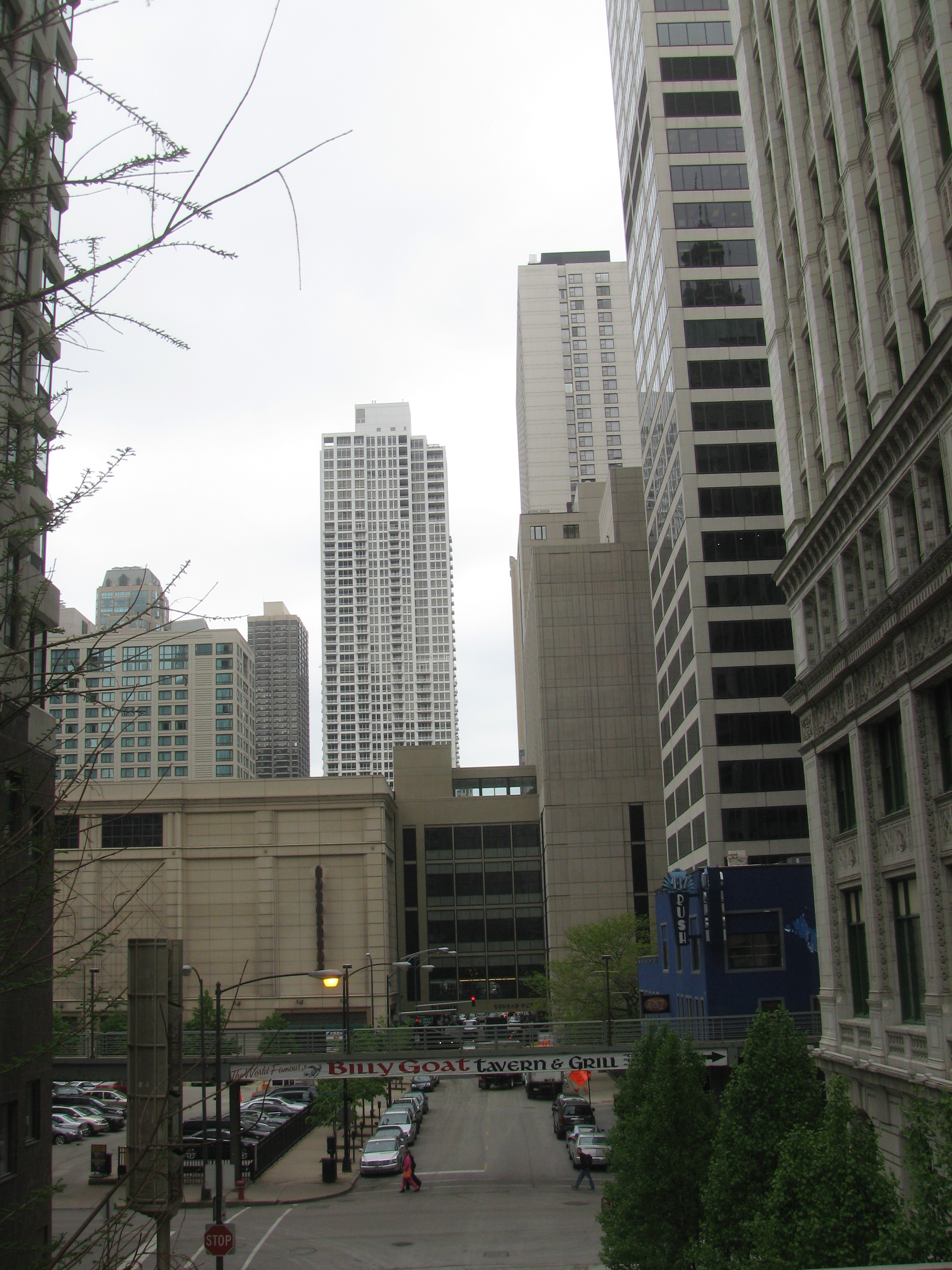
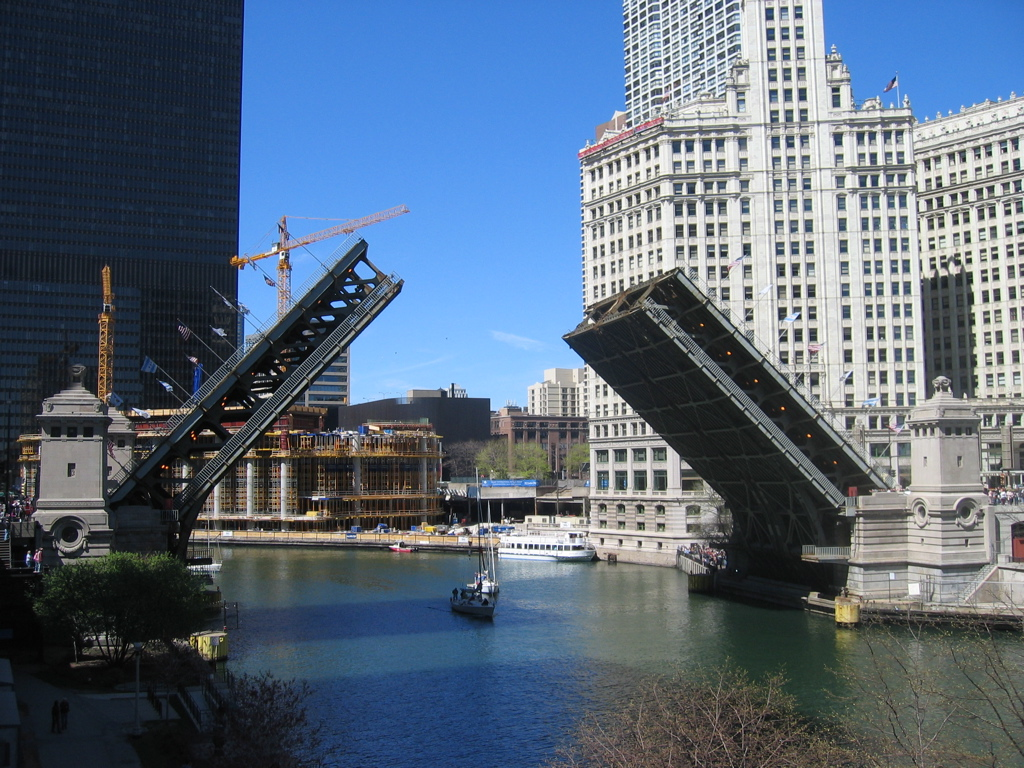
- Intersections Endpoint at State Street (2008-05-14) Wabash intersection (2008-05-14) One-way traffic begins at Ohio Street Frank Sinatra Way intersection (2008-05-14) Magnificent Mile's Michigan Ave. from Rush & Ohio Streets (2007-07-28) Aon Center, Tribune Tower, NBC Tower, et al. from Rush & Ohio Streets (2007-07-28) Connors Park (2008-05-14) Mariano Park (2008-05-14) Rush Street views Street view with carriage traffic (2008-05-14) Chestnut St (Mike Ditka Way) intersection (2008-05-14) Rush Street-State Street sign Connors Park (2008-05-14) Foot of Rush Street Foot of Rush St. from across Chicago River View from foot of Rush Street Foot of Rush Street from beyond Michigan Avenue Bridge

In the 1950s, the Chicago City Council began to use the Uniform Vehicle Code of 1931 to fight traffic congestion by creating one-way streets. This was most effectively used in the Loop and Near North Side community areas. Most of the Near North Side streets remain one-way today as a result. Rush Street is among the area's one-way streets: except for a short segment, only northbound travel is permitted.

== Geography ==
Rush Street runs north–south and in a north-northwest direction (see map in external links). It runs north–south at 65 east from 400 north at its southern terminus at Kinzie Avenue to 800 north at Chicago Avenue between Michigan Avenue to the east at 100 east and Wabash Avenue to the west at 44 east. On the north side of Chicago it runs straight on a slight diagonal to the street grid. By the time it travels three blocks north to Delaware Place at 900 north, it intersects Wabash. It then continues on a diagonal for four more blocks where it intersects the north–south running State Street (the centerline between east and west) at Cedar Street which runs at 1120 north. It is crossed by Ohio Street and Ontario Street which feed from and to the Kennedy Expressway to the west.

On the north side of Chicago Avenue Rush Street is part of the Gold Coast neighborhood of the Near North Side community area. The Gold Coast is the nation's second wealthiest neighborhood, trailing only the Central Park East neighborhood of Manhattan's Upper East Side. Between Chicago Avenue and the Chicago River, Rush Street is part of the River North Gallery District. The River North District hosts more art galleries than any neighborhood outside of Manhattan.

Both of the diagonal crossings border Chicago Park District parks that are situated on the resulting triangular land plots. At the Wabash crossing, which has an official address of 871 North Wabash, a park exists that was renamed Connors Park for former Illinois State Senate Minority Leader William Connors in 1970. This park was acquired by the city in 1848 and has been renamed several times. At the State Street crossing, which has an official address of 1031 North State Street, Mariano Park exists and was renamed for Louis Mariano in 1970. This park was acquired by the city in 1848 and was transferred to the Park District in 1959. It hosts a structure designed by Birch Burdette Long, who was a Frank Lloyd Wright protege, according to a plaque in the park. In the area surrounded by the Trump International Hotel & Tower to the west, the Chicago River to the south, Rush Street and the Wrigley Building to the east and McDonald's and River Plaza to the north the towers designers have planned a 1.2-acre (4,856.2 m^{2}) Riverfront Park & Riverwalk along a space that is 500 feet (152.4 m).

In the Gold Coast neighborhood, honorary streets such as Frank Sinatra Way (Bellevue Place at 1030 north) and Mike Ditka Way (East Chesnut Street at 860 north) cross Rush Street. Ditka has a restaurant at 100 East Chestnut and coached the Chicago Bears to a Super Bowl XX victory. Sinatra made "My Kind of Town (Chicago is)" and "Chicago (That Toddlin' Town)" famous.

== Bridge ==
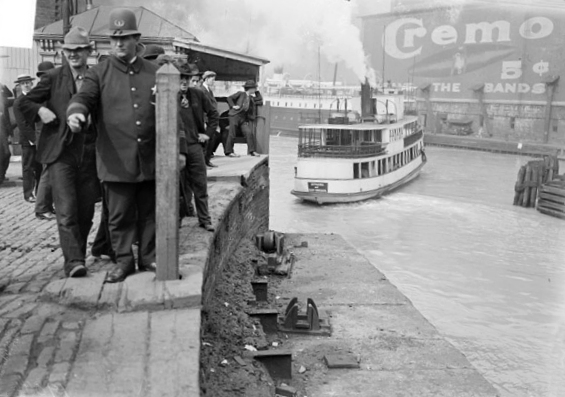
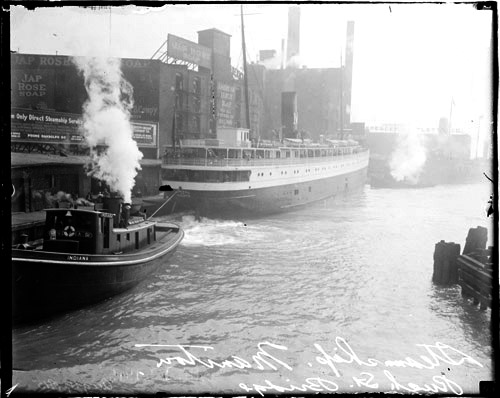
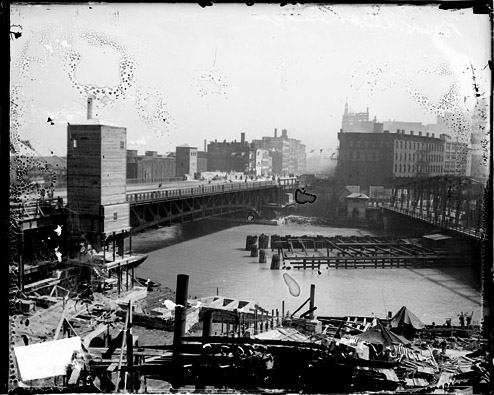
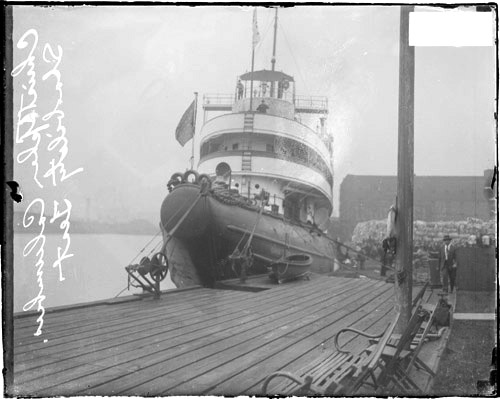
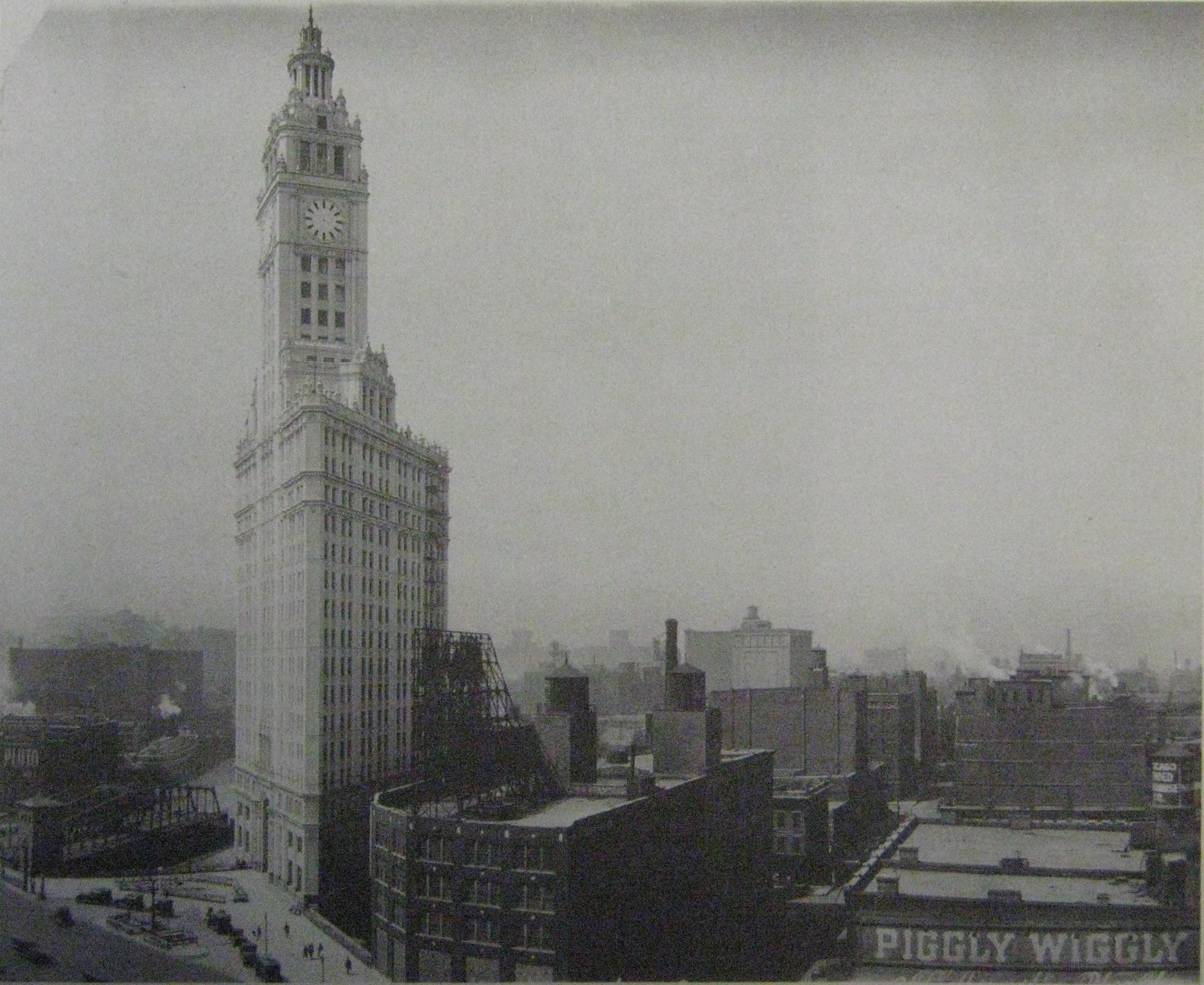
- Rush Street Bridge Rush Street Bridge accident scene (1904) Manitou arriving at Rush Street Bridge (1915) New Rush Street Bridge, Opening Day (1920) SS Christopher Columbus - Rush St. Bridge (1915) Library of Congress Photos, Chicago Daily News collection Wrigley Building with the Rush Street Bridge (1921)

While there is currently no bridge along Rush Street at the main stem of the Chicago River, the main stem has through its history been crossed by four bridges at Rush Street. The first bridge was a floating bridge that was hinged to one bank. Ropes were used to open and close this bridge. A March 1849 ice storm was the first of two instances in which all bridges on the main stem of the Chicago River were destroyed overnight. An iron and timber swing bridge with center supports was built in 1857 at a cost of $48,000. The bridge stood until, on November 3, 1863, a passing ship's whistle spooked a herd of cattle that was crowding the bridge and stampeded into the river. The bridge was repaired and still in use on October 8, 1871 when it was destroyed in the Great Chicago Fire. In 1872 the Detroit Bridge and Iron Works company built a wrought-iron replacement that stood until 1883, when a barge struck and collapsed the bridge. It was replaced by another swing bridge that lasted for several decades until after the Michigan Avenue Bridge was built in 1920. This final 1884 bridge had trusses measuring 30 feet (9.1 m) in the center and 20 feet (6.1 m) on the ends. Its deck used 4-inch (100 mm) white pine planks.

The southeast corner of the Rush Street Bridge, which connected to Michigan Avenue, was the location of the Goodrich docks from which the SS Christopher Columbus made its daily round-trip excursions to Milwaukee, Wisconsin. Although she was used for excursions elsewhere around the Great Lakes, her regular schedule was a daily trip to Milwaukee, leaving Chicago mid-morning, sailing to Milwaukee for a two-hour stopover, and then returning. The Goodrich Transportation Company used the Goodrich wharves from the time of the American Civil War until the 1930s to connect Chicago with other port locations throughout Lake Michigan and the Great Lakes. Today, skyscrapers have replaced the industrial structures that historically lined the riverbanks of the nations most significant inland port.

Before the Michigan Avenue bridge (pictured right), vehicular traffic crossed the river at Rush and traveled up to Ontario Street before heading east to Pine Street (now North Michigan Avenue after multiple renamings). The bridge carried 77% of all the automobiles and 23% of the commercial vehicles that commuted into the Loop each day. There were several plans starting in the 1880s for improving Michigan Avenue that involved Rush Street, but nothing came of any of them. The final Rush Street Bridge was not designed for automobile traffic, which caused congestion on the south bank of the River where both Michigan and Wabash fed onto River Street (now Wacker Drive). In May 1904, the Chicago Tribune declared that the 36 feet (11 m) wide Rush Street Bridge, which handled approximately 50% of the north–south traffic in the city, was unfit for the contemporary pedestrian and vehicular traffic. Thus Daniel Burnham's 1909 Plan of Chicago called for the replacement of the bridge with a new bridge at Michigan Avenue and the redevelopment of Wacker Drive. The bridge was quickly removed after the completion of the new Michigan Avenue Bridge.

== Commerce and education ==
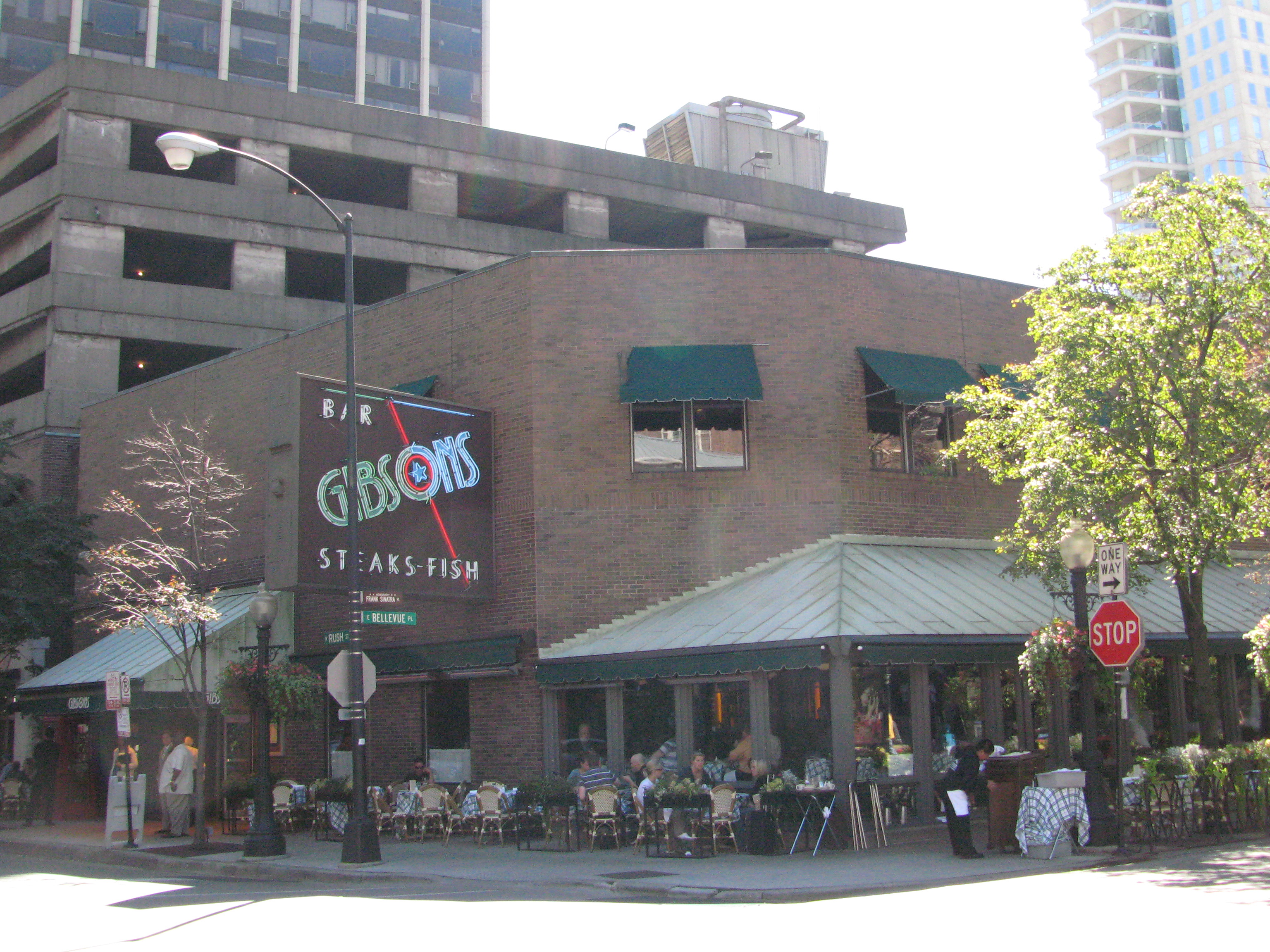
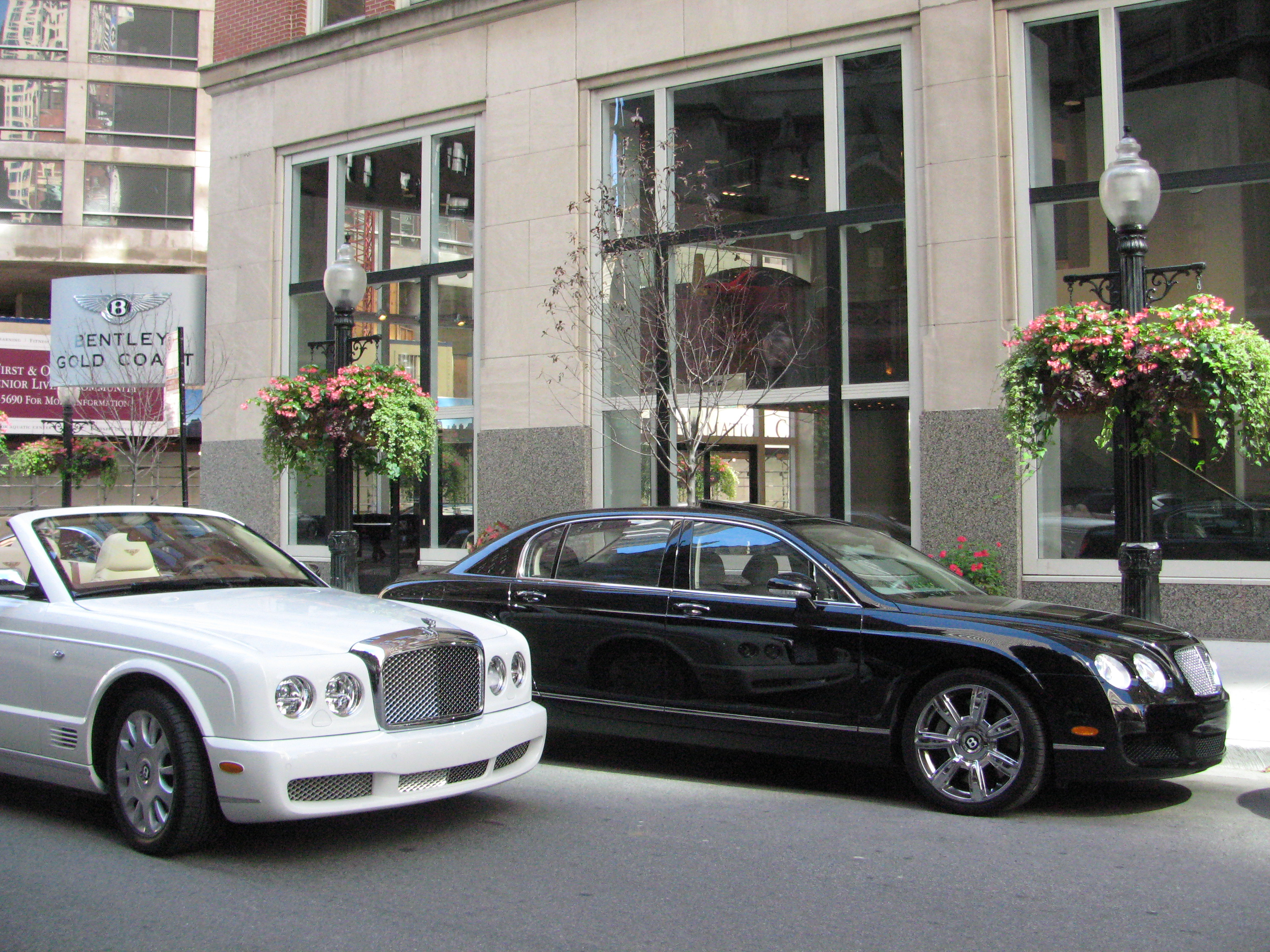
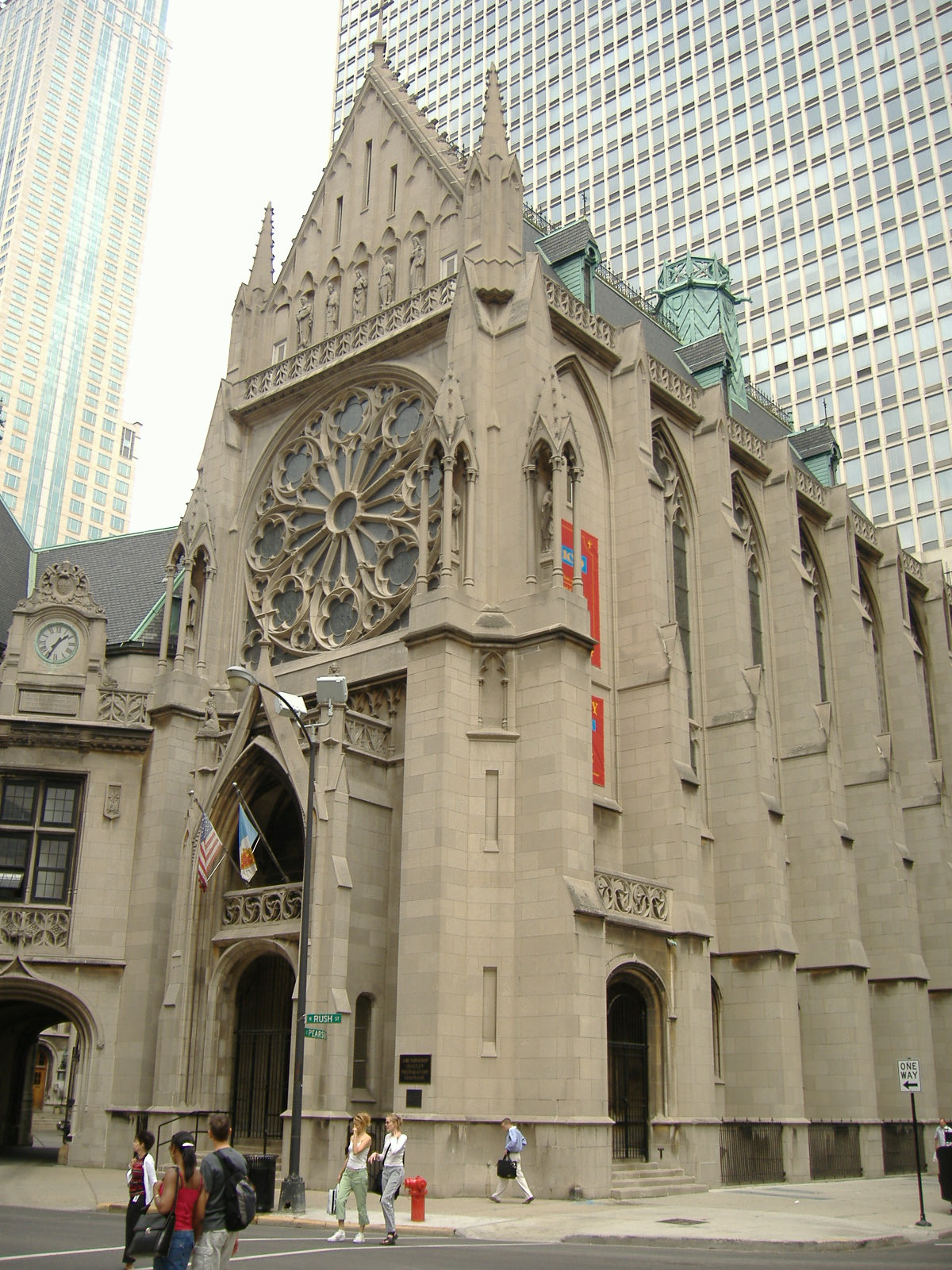
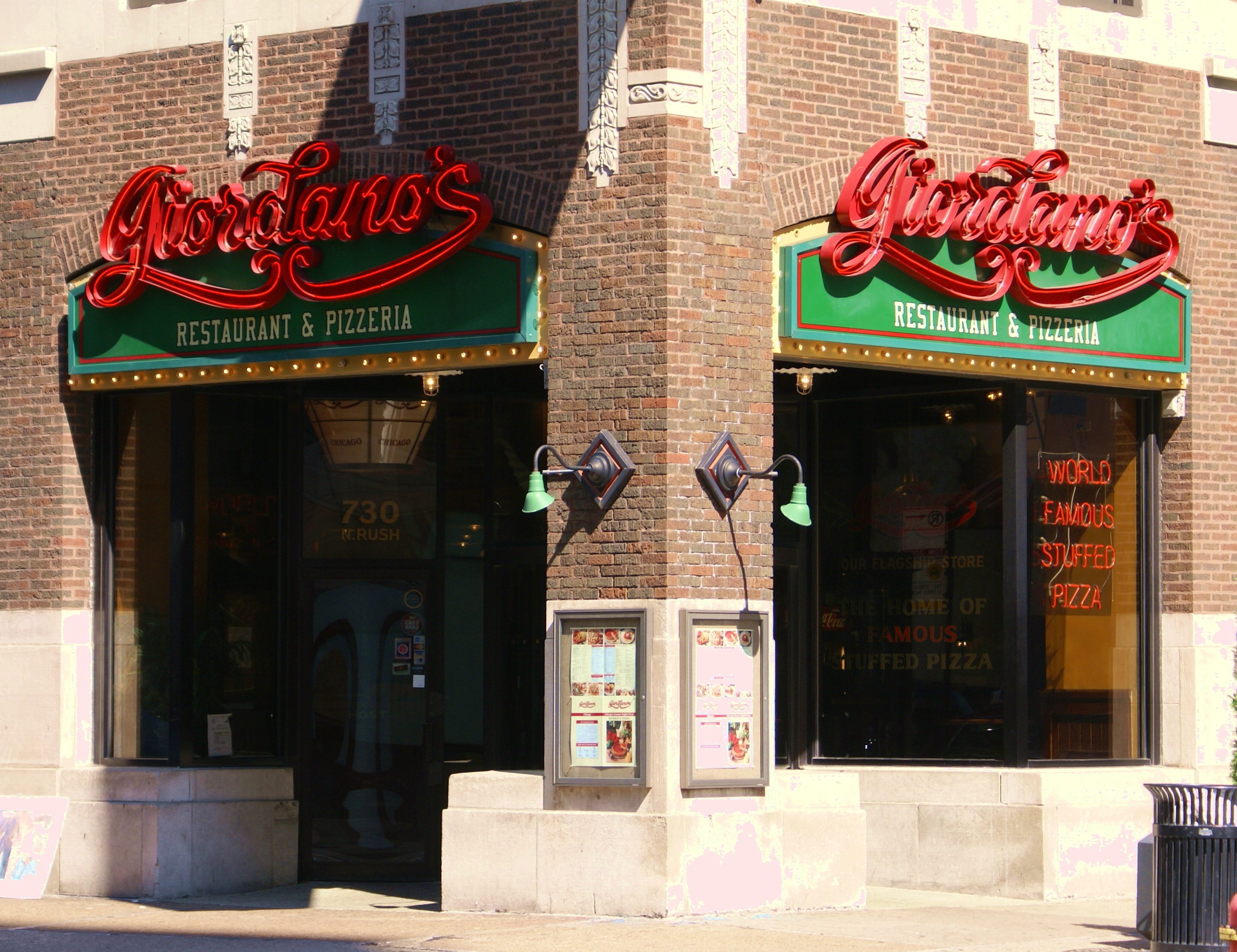
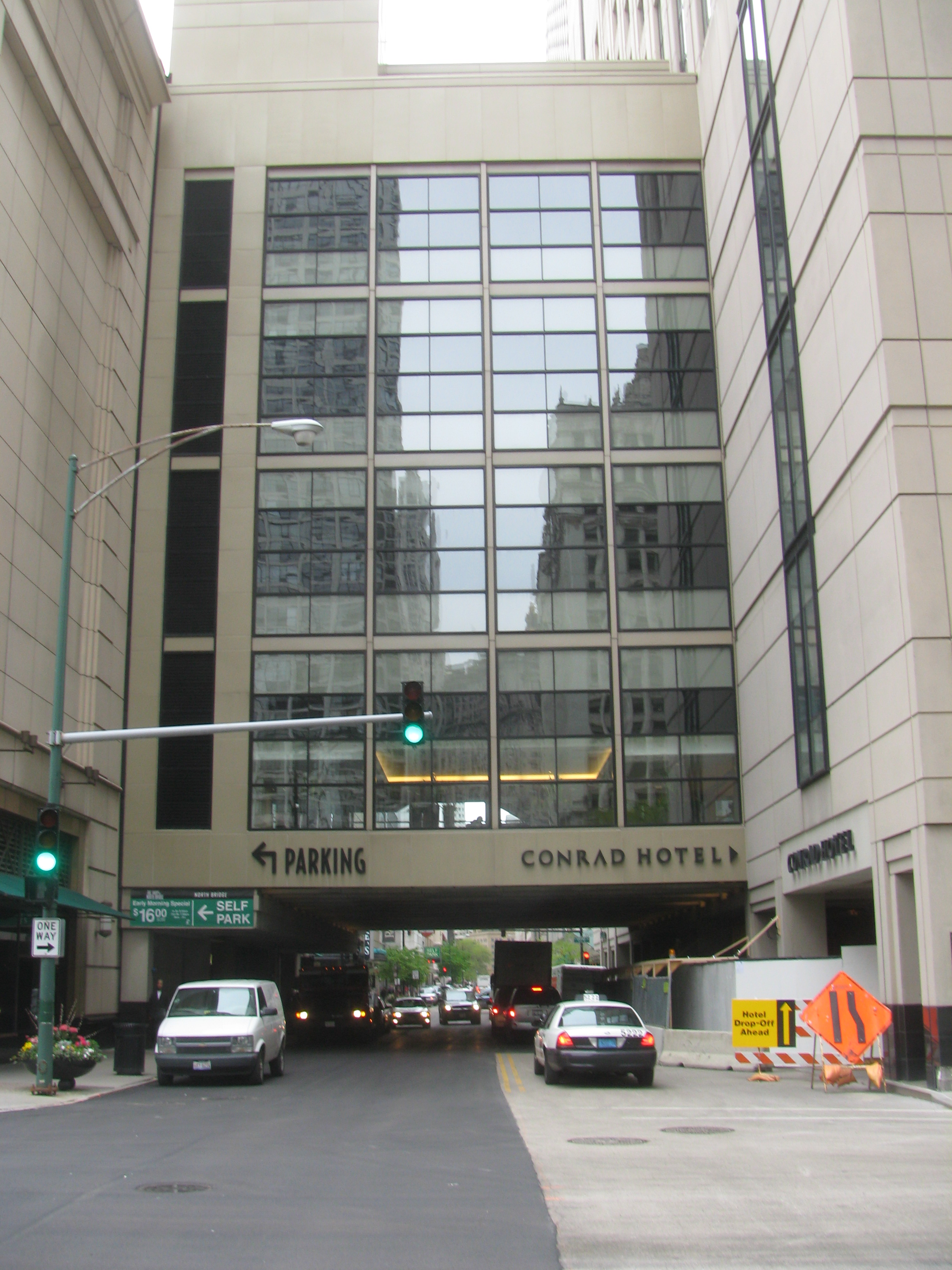
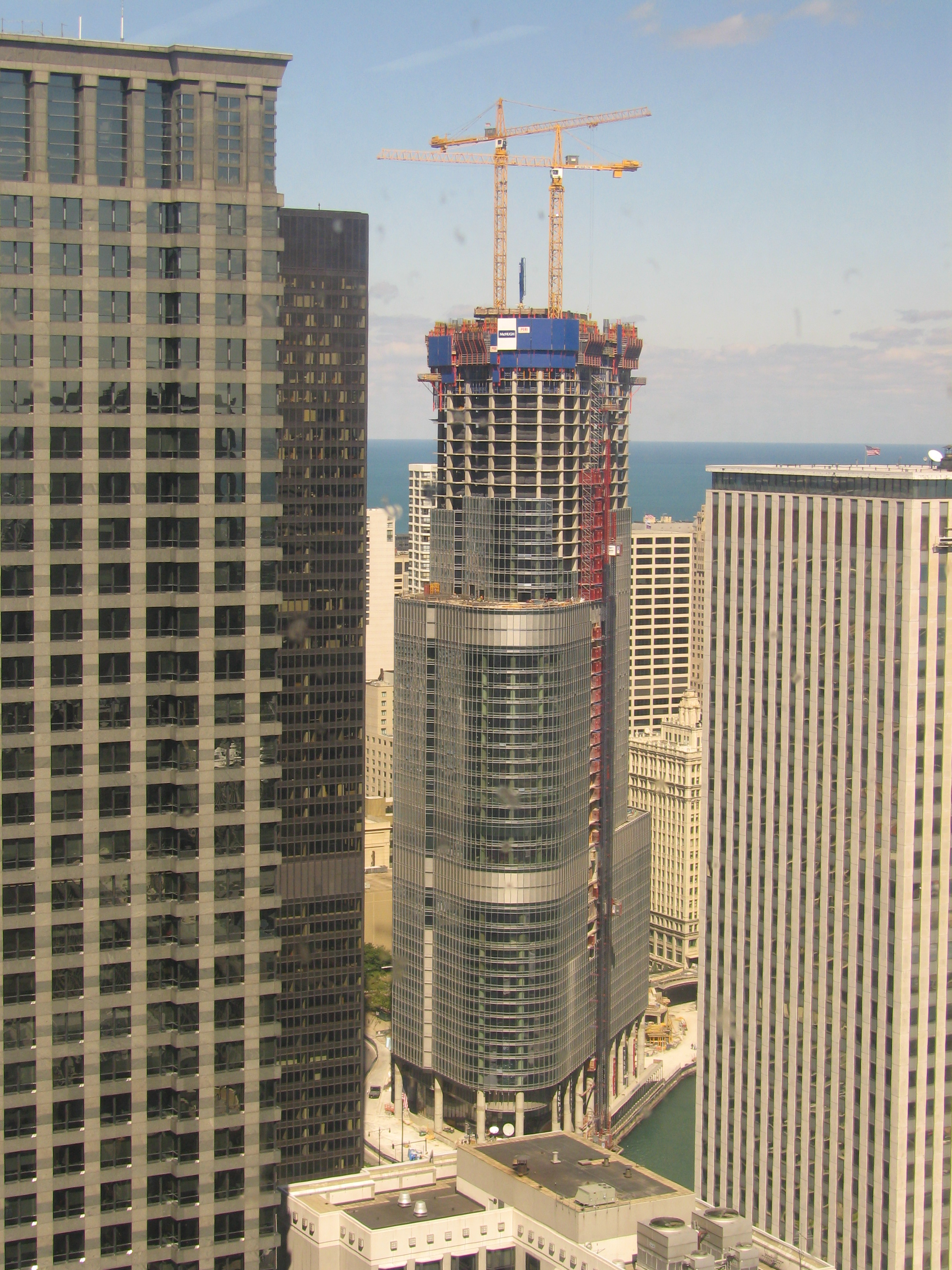
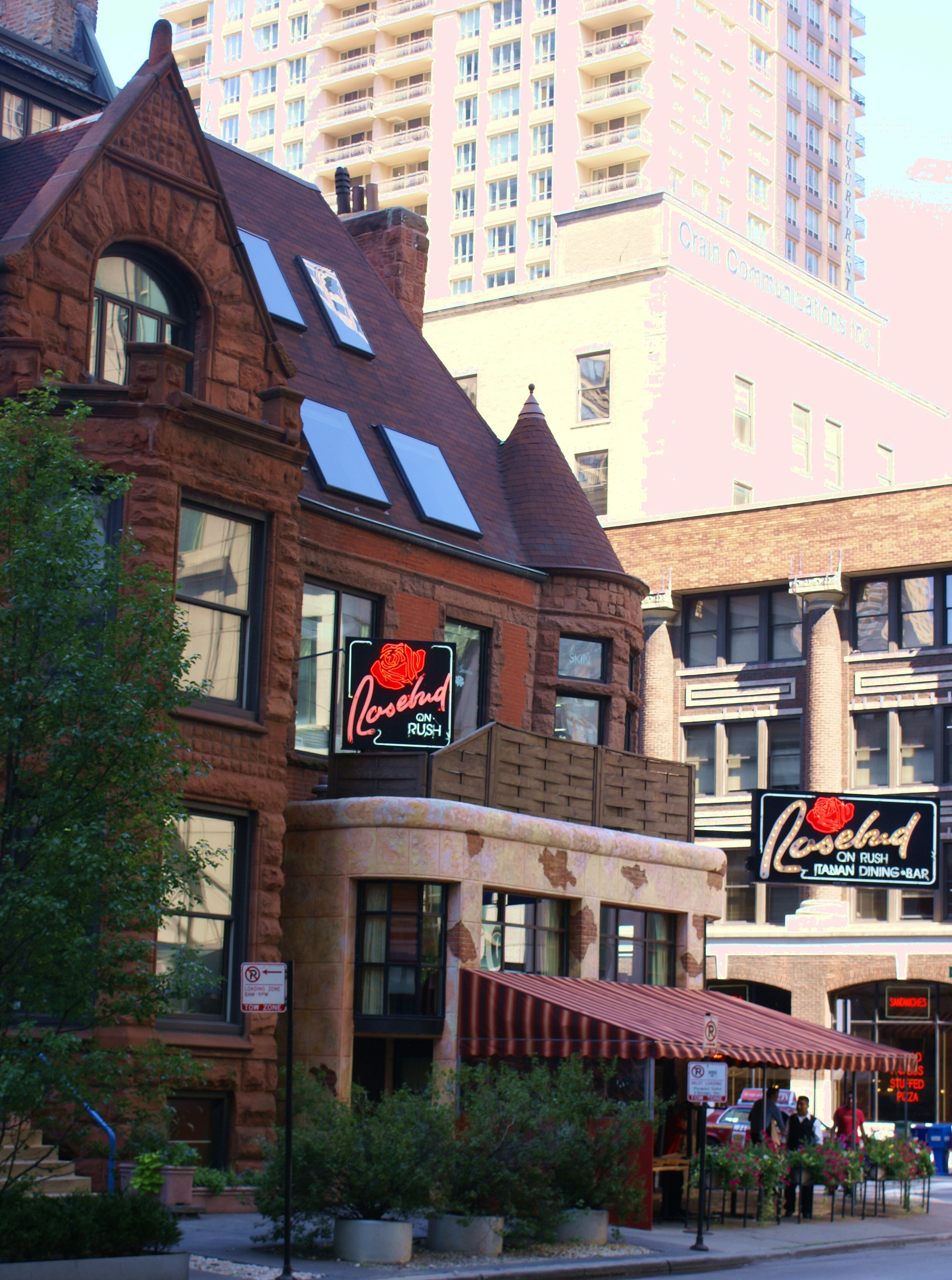
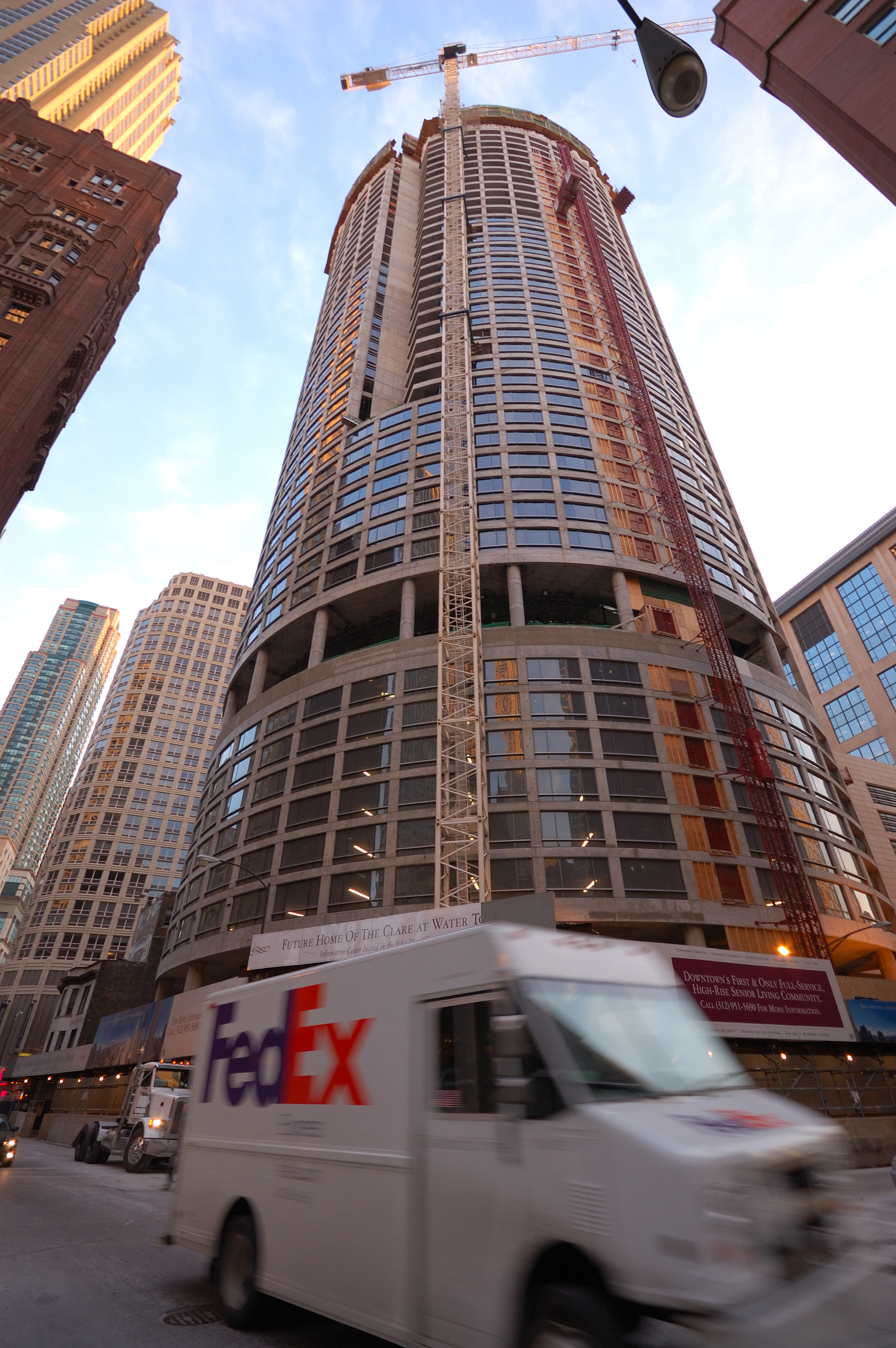
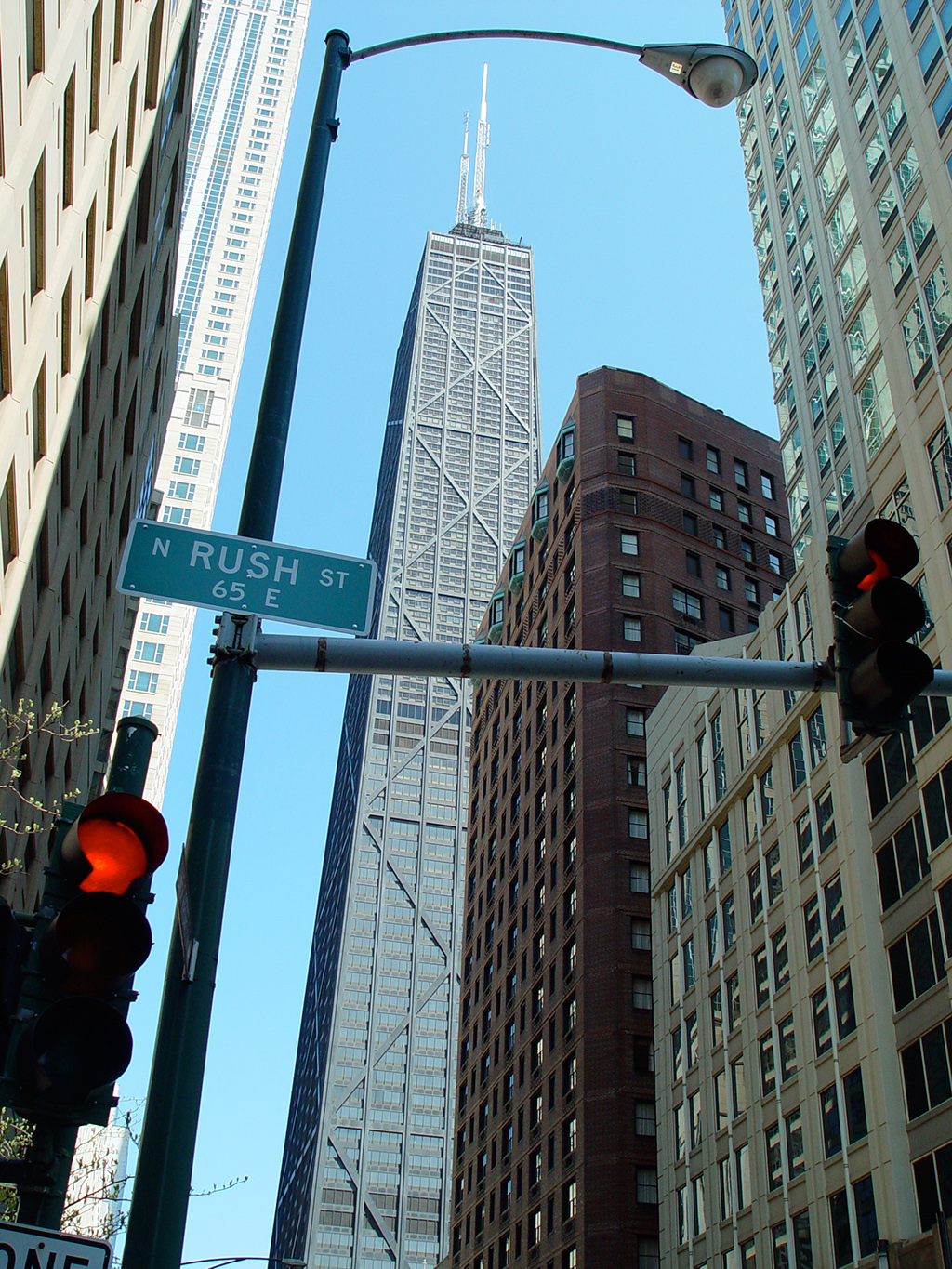
- Left to Right: Gibsons Steakhouse, Bentley/Lamborghini Showroom, Archbishop Quigley Preparatory Seminary, Giordano's, and the Conrad Hotel. Left to right: Trump Tower Chicago (9-14-07), Rosebud on Rush (7-29-07), The Clare @ Water Tower (1-16-08), Hancock Center from Rush Street (5-02-04), and 55 East Erie Street from walkway over Rush St. start (5-14-08)

In the 1960s, Rush Street was the center of the Chicago nightlife as home to many great cabarets, bars, clubs and restaurants. However, many of the bars migrated north to Division Street as the street gentrified. Currently, the late night establishments mostly lure suburbanites and tourists. The Chicago Sun-Times describes it as the "hippest strip" in Chicago, with specific kudos to the part between Oak Street and Chicago Avenue. It continues to be the destination where visiting conventioners in pursuit of Chicago nightlife are brought by taxi as well as a preferred place for thirtysomething singles to congregate at night, especially in the summer. Although Rush Street ends two blocks south of Division Street, the nightlife ambiance now continues to Division and spreads west from there.

Rush Street is known for hosting some of the few highly rated and esteemed restaurants in the Chicago Gold Coast neighborhood. According to Frommer's and Zagat Survey, Gibsons Steakhouse is one of the favorite restaurants in Chicago, and is located on Rush Street. Rush Street is a block east of the original location of the Chicago-style deep dish pizza, Uno Chicago Grill, and it hosts Giordano's, its answer to Uno's. Among the most prominent businesses along this strip is the Bentley and Lamborghini Gold Coast showroom, which is located across East Pearson Street from The Clare at Water Tower along Rush Street. The Clare is one of the tallest residential buildings reserved for seniors anywhere in the world. Rush Street's southern terminus is adjacent to a rear entrance of the Wrigley Building as well as the Trump International Hotel and Tower which has a 401-North Wabash address. The 800 block of the Gold Coast neighborhood portion of Rush Street is a block away from Michigan Avenue and four of the tallest buildings in the world: John Hancock Center (875 North Michigan Avenue), 900 North Michigan, Water Tower Place (845 Michigan), & Park Tower (800 Michigan). Four more of the fifty tallest buildings in Chicago are also a block from Rush Street: Olympia Centre (737 Michigan), One Magnificent Mile, (980 Michigan), Chicago Place (700 Michigan), and Palmolive Building, (919 Michigan). 55 East Erie Street, which was the second tallest all-residential building in the world from 2004 until 2007 when 340 on the Park was completed, is among the skyscrapers on or with entrances on Rush street. There is a current proposal to redevelop 740 North Rush Street (at the corner of East Superior Street) with a fifty-story skyscraper designed by Skidmore, Owings & Merrill and developed by Fordham Company. This address currently houses the Chicago offices of Crain Communications Inc., and it is just north of Giordano's, which has a 730 North Rush Street address.

Several prominent hotels are located on or bounded by Rush street. The Peninsula Chicago is one of only three five star hotels in the Midwestern United States, is located on East Superior between Rush Street and Michigan. The Four Seasons Hotel Chicago, another of the Midwest's five star hotels, is also located on a cross street between Rush Street and Michigan Avenue. These two hotels host the highest rated spas in Illinois. Although the main entrance and official address of the Chicago Marriott Downtown Magnificent Mile is 540 North Michigan Avenue, the driveway for the hotel has a 541 North Rush Street address. Similarly, the former Chicago Conrad Hotel (since 2015, The Gwen) located at 521 North Rush Street is a reconstruction of the former 520 North Michigan Chicago Landmark McGraw-Hill Building.

The former Archbishop Quigley Preparatory Seminary, which has been converted for use by the Roman Catholic Archdiocese of Chicago is located on Rush Street between Superior and Chestnut. The Water Tower Campus of the Loyola University Chicago is located along East Pearson St., which crosses Rush Street between the Bentley/Lamborghini Gold Coast Showroom to the North and The Clare @ Water Tower to the South on the west side of the street. The Quigley Seminary Building was listed on the National Register of Historic Places on February 16, 1996. Rush Street also hosts one of three regional Royal Thai Consulate-General locations to support Royal Thai Embassy in Washington, D.C.

== Intersections ==
The entire route is in Chicago, Cook County.

mi	km	Destinations	Notes
0.00	0.00	North State Street/East Cedar Street	Northern terminus
0.06	0.097	East Bellevue Place	
0.12	0.19	East Oak Street	
0.18	0.29	East Walton Street	One-way westbound only
0.24	0.39	East Delaware Place	One-way eastbound only
0.30	0.48	East Chestnut Street	One-way westbound only
0.36	0.58	East Pearson Street	One-way eastbound only
0.42	0.68	East Chicago Avenue	
0.48	0.77	East Superior Street	One-way eastbound only
0.54	0.87	East Superior Street	One-way eastbound only
0.60	0.97	East Erie Street	One-way eastbound only
0.65	1.05	East Ontario Street	One-way westbound only
0.70	1.13	East Ohio Street	One-way eastbound only
0.76	1.22	East Grand Avenue	One-way westbound only
0.81	1.30	East Illinois Street	One-way eastbound only
0.87	1.40	East Hubbard Street	
0.91	1.46	East Kinzie Street/East North Water Street	
1.000 mi = 1.609 km; 1.000 km = 0.621 mi
