= The Clare =

Skyscraper in Chicago, Illinois

Coordinates: 41.8973°N 87.6263°W

- Interactive map of the The Clare area

General information
- Status: Completed
- Type: Residences
- Location: 55 E. Pearson St. Chicago, Illinois
- Construction started: 2006
- Completed: 2009
- Renovated: 2016
- Owner: LCS Life Care Services LLC

Height
- Roof: 179 m (587 ft)

Technical details
- Floor count: 53

Design and construction
- Architect: Perkins+Will

The Clare (formerly The Clare at Water Tower) is a high-rise independent living community for seniors. It is situated on the Loyola University Chicago Water Tower Campus in Chicago's Gold Coast at Rush Street & Pearson Street. It is a continuing care retirement community senior-living community in the Gold Coast that offers a LifeCare contract. The 53-story building is designed by Perkins and Will, and is one of the tallest buildings reserved for senior citizens in the world. This building also includes 50,000 square feet (4,600 square meters) of classroom space at the bottom to replace two small classroom buildings belonging to Loyola University Chicago.

Until November 2011, The Clare was owned and operated by the Franciscan Sisters of Chicago, a religious organization that runs senior care facilities throughout the Midwest. On November 15, 2011, The Clare filed for bankruptcy protection from creditors after failing to make debt payments. At the time, the building was only 34% occupied. The property was sold in a bankruptcy auction to Senior Care Development, LLC, a Harrison, New York–based non-denominational senior care company. The property is managed by Life Care Services.

From 2014 to 2016, The Clare's occupancy increased from 44% to 98% and now has a wait list for larger units. In 2016, The Clare underwent extensive renovations, including transforming the Grand Lobby, adding a Bistro Café to the ninth floor, overhauling the 53rd floor into a third dining venue called The Abbey on 53, and upgrading the layout and décor of the Grafton Dining Room.

In early 2020, The Clare was sold to Des Moines, Iowa–based LCS, which is the second-largest operator of senior living communities in the United States. The sale closed for an estimated $105 million.

== Photo gallery ==
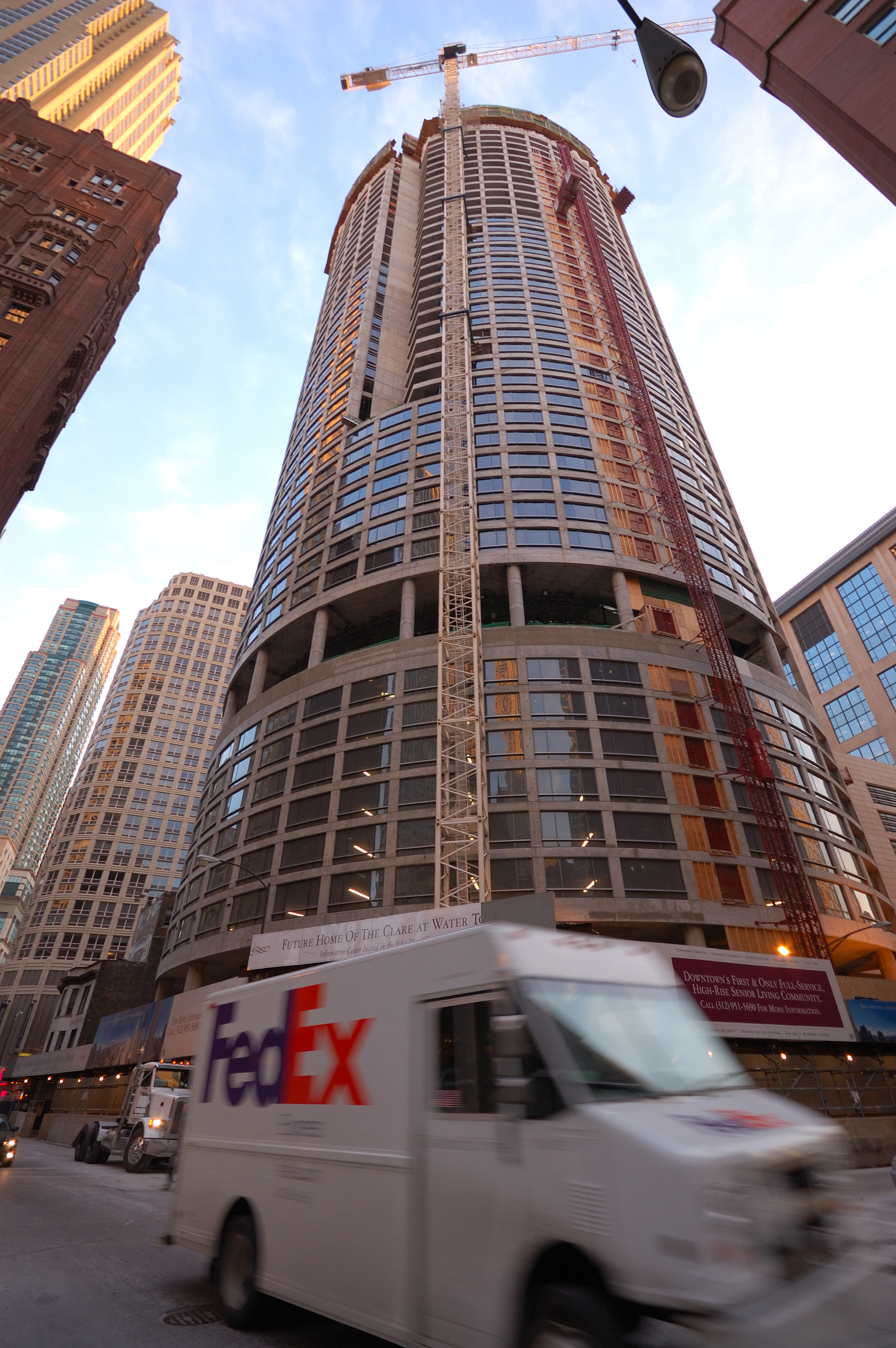
2008-01-16

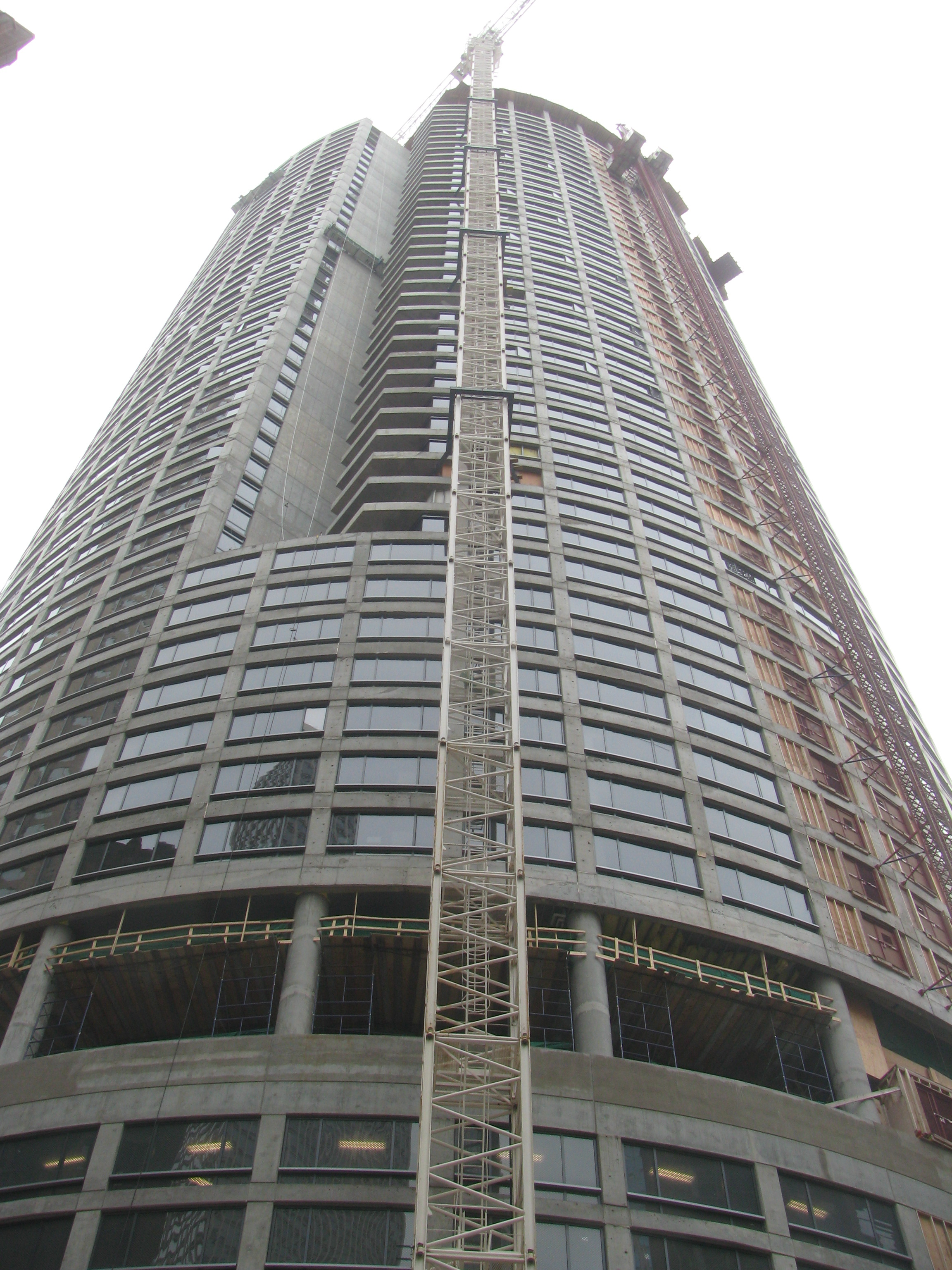
2008-05-14

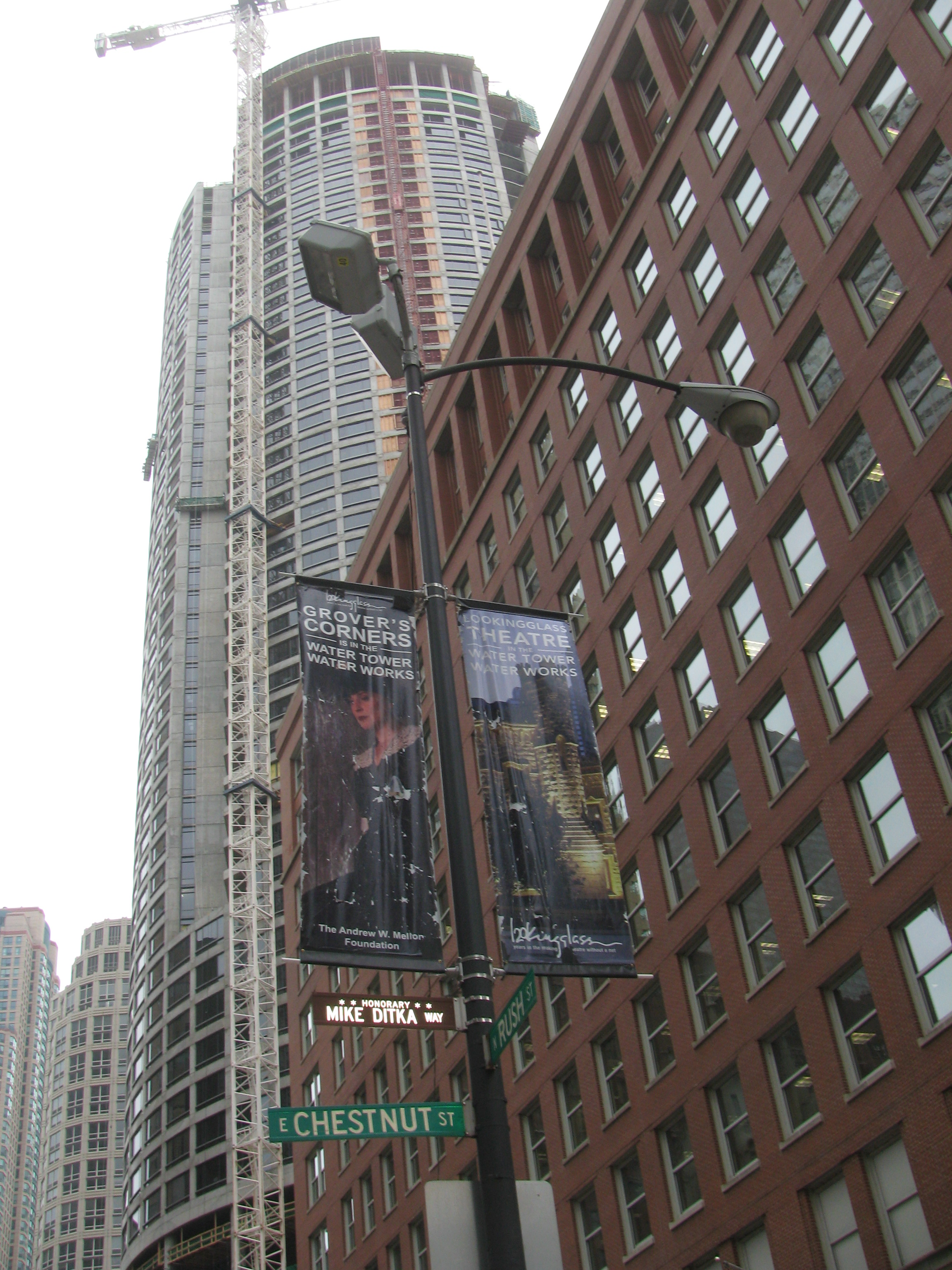
2008-05-14

== See also ==
- List of tallest buildings in Chicago
