= 55 East Erie Street =

Skyscraper in Chicago, Illinois

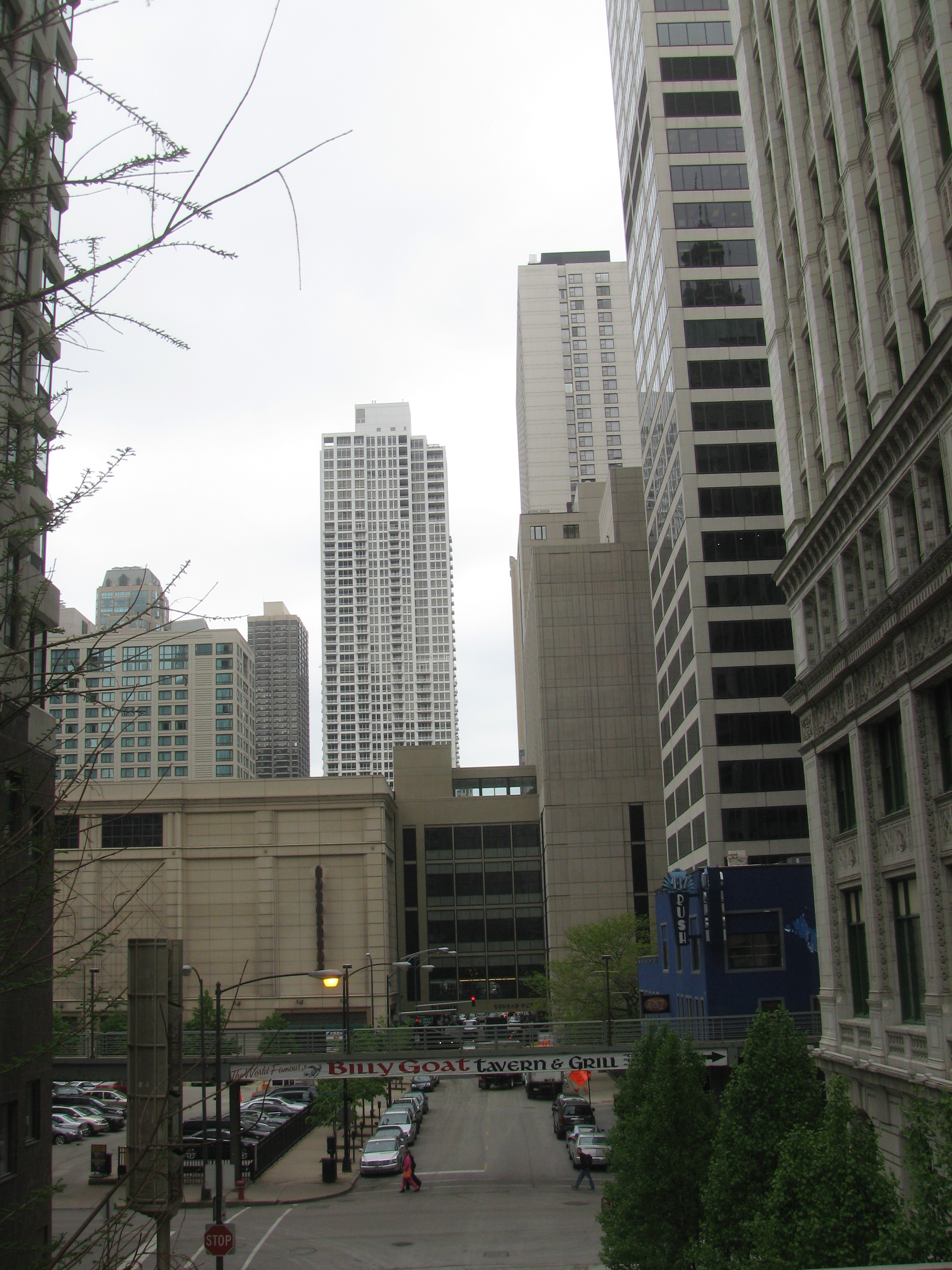

- Location within Chicago metropolitan area

General information
- Type: Condominiums
- Location: 55 East Erie Street, Chicago, Illinois, United States
- Coordinates: 41.8939°N 87.6260°W
- Construction started: 2001
- Completed: 2004
- Opening: 2004

Height
- Roof: 646.3 ft (197 m)

Technical details
- Floor count: 56

Design and construction
- Architects: Fujikawa Johnson & Associates; Searl & Associates Architects, PC

55 East Erie is an all-residential skyscraper in Chicago. It is at 647 feet (197 m). Designed by Fujikawa Johnson & Associates and Searl & Associates Architects, the 56 story building was completed in 2004 and is the fourth-tallest all-residential building in the United States after Trump World Tower in New York City, One Museum Park in Chicago, and the nearby 340 on the Park completed in 2007 in Chicago.

The design called for flying buttresses around the mechanical penthouse, which were eventually dropped. Early on, the building was envisioned as much taller in order to house a Mandarin Oriental hotel, but a deal was never struck.

55 East Erie has 194 residential units, including seven floors of split story penthouse homes. The building also features four “Skyhomes,” each a unique four story townhome with its own elevator. Amenities for residents include a swimming pool, fitness center, men's and women's locker rooms each with their own steam room, and a hospitality room.

== See also ==
- List of skyscrapers
- List of tallest buildings in the United States
- List of tallest buildings in Chicago
- World's tallest structures
