= World's 101 Best Steak Restaurants =

Annual international food award

== Overview ==
World's 101 Best Steak Restaurants is an annual international restaurant ranking focused on steak restaurants. Published since 2019, it ranks 101 Steak Restaurants worldwide following restaurant evaluations conducted through a network of regional assessors referred to as Steak Ambassadors.

The ranking is published by Upper Cut Media House, a media company based in London. Restaurants appearing in the ranking have included establishments from Europe, North and South America, Asia, Australia, Africa and the Middle East.

== History ==
The World's 101 Best Steak Restaurants has been founded in 2018 and published its first ranking 2019. The ranking was created by Ekkehard Knobelspies and is published by Upper Cut Media House in London.

The first editions included restaurants from the United States, United Kingdom, Argentina, Australia and Spain. The geographical scope subsequently expanded to include restaurants across Asia, the Middle East and Africa.

Firedoor in Sydney held the first position in the 2020 and 2021 rankings. Hawksmoor subsequently placed first 2022.

Buenos Aires restaurant Don Julio reached the No.1 position in 2023 and retained it in 2024 and 2025, becoming the first restaurant to lead the ranking for three consecutive years.

In 2026, La Cúpula de El Capricho in Jiménez de Jamuz, Spain, took the No.1 position, followed by Margaret in Sydney and Laia Erretegia in Hondarriba, Spain.

== Organisation and evaluation ==
The ranking is published by Upper Cut Media House and uses a network of regional evaluators known as Steak Ambassadors.

Restaurants are visited anonymously as part of the evaluation process. Assessment criteria include the quality and preparation of the meat, the range and provenance of cuts offered, ageing methods, staff knowledge, information provided about the beef, the wine offering, reservations, online presence and the overall restaurant environment.

The number of restaurants considered has increased as the ranking has expanded internationally. Independent media have reported that approximately 850 steak restaurants were evaluated for the 2024 edition and that more than 900 restaurants were reviewed for the 2025 ranking.

== Ranking ==
No.	2021	2022	2023
1	(Australia) Firedoor	(United Kingdom) Hawksmoor	(Argentina) Don Julio
2	(Argentina) Don Julio	(Argentina) Don Julio	(United Kingdom) Hawksmoor
3	(United Kingdom) Hawksmoor	(Australia) Firedoor	(United States) American Cut
4	(Spain) Asador Etxebarri	(United States) Keens	(Belgium) Carcasse
5	(Spain) El Capricho	(United States) Gibsons Italia	(Spain) El Capricho
6	(United States) Butcher & Singer	(United States) CUT	(Republic of Ireland) F.X. Buckley
7	(United States) Gibsons Italia	(United States) Bavette's	(Italy) I Due Cippi
8	(United States) Porter House New York	(Belgium) Carcasse	(Australia) Rockpool
9	(United States) Keens	(Spain) El Capricho	(Spain) Lana
10	(United States) CUT	(United States) Nick & Stef's	(United States) Bazaar Meat

No.	2024	2025	2026
1	(Argentina) Don Julio	(Argentina) Don Julio	(Spain) La Cúpula
2	(Spain) El Capricho	(Australia) Margaret	(Australia) Margaret
3	(Australia) Margaret	(Spain) Laia	(Spain) Laia
4	(United States) COTE	(Italy) I Due Cippi	(Italy) I Due Cippi
5	(Belgium) Carcasse	(Singapore) Burnt Ends	(Spain) Lana
6	(Italy) I Due Cippi	(Spain) El Capricho	(Spain) Casa Julián
7	(Spain) Laia	(Spain) Casa Julián	(United Kingdom) Ibai
8	(Australia) Rockpool	(Spain) Lana	(Sweden) Restaurang AG
9	(Sweden) Restaurang AG	(Sweden) Restaurang AG	(Singapore) Burnt Ends
10	(United States) CUT	(United States) COTE	(Spain) El Capricho

== Ranking Criteria ==
According to the ranking’s published methodology, restaurants are currently assessed according to nine principal criteria. These include the quality of the meat in terms of taste, terroir, character, marbling, cut and preparation; the selection and variety of cuts, including ageing, origin and breed; service quality and meat expertise; the information provided about individual cuts; the wine offering; the reservation process; online presence; and the design and overall environment of the restaurant.

== Hall of Fire ==
In 2026, the ranking introduced the Hall of Fire, a category intended for restaurants that have achieved sustained success in the ranking.

Don Julio in Buenos Aires became its first inductee after finishing first for three consecutive years between 2023 and 2025.

Following its induction, Don Julio was no longer included in the regular annual ranking.

== International coverage ==
World’s 101 Best Steak Restaurants has received media coverage in a number of countries, particularly in connection with the performance of restaurants in individual markets.

European food and hospitality publications including Falstaff have reported on the ranking, its evaluation process and the performance of restaurants in different editions.

Australian media including The Australian and The Daily Telegraph have covered the performance of Australian restaurants in the ranking. Sydney has regularly had multiple restaurants represented, including Firedoor, Margaret and other venues.

In the United States, the ranking has been covered by national and regional media in connection with restaurants in New York, Chicago, Texas and other markets. In 2025, 19 US restaurants appeared in the list.

The ranking has also received coverage in Asian publications, including media in Singapore and Hong Kong reporting on restaurants from their respective markets appearing in the annual list.

The 2026 edition received international coverage after La Cúpula de El Capricho became the first Spanish restaurant to take the No.1 position.
