= West Loop–LaSalle Street Historic District =

Historic district in Illinois, United States

- U.S. National Register of Historic Places
- U.S. Historic district
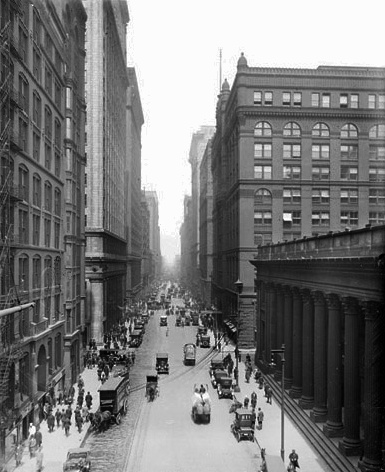
- LaSalle Street from the Chicago Board of Trade Building, 1916

- Location within Chicago metropolitan area Location within Illinois Location within the United States
- Location: Roughly bounded by W. Wacker Drive N. & S. Wells Street, W. Van Buren Street and N. & S. Clark Street; 330 S. Wells & 212 W. Van Buren Sts., Chicago, Illinois
- Coordinates: 41°52′50″N 87°37′56″W
- Area: 70 acres (28 ha)
- NRHP reference No.: 12001238
- Added to NRHP: June 1, 2013

The West Loop–LaSalle Street Historic District is a historic district centered on LaSalle Street in the western Chicago Loop. The district was added to the National Register of Historic Places on June 1, 2013. A boundary increase on July 24, 2017, added two buildings at 330 S. Wells Street and 212 W. Van Buren Street to the district.

The district encompasses Chicago's financial center, which is anchored by the Chicago Board of Trade Building, and also includes several of its major banking institutions including the Federal Reserve bank and several government buildings. Development in the district began in 1873 and, with the exception of a lull during the Great Depression and World War II, has continued through the present day.

Most of the district's buildings are high-rises with at least ten stories, with the tallest being the 49-story One North LaSalle Building. Many of Chicago's prominent architectural firms designed buildings within the district, and the buildings feature styles such as Classical Revival, Chicago School, Art Deco, Romanesque Revival, and International. Significant buildings within the district include the Federal Reserve Bank of Chicago, Chicago City Hall, and several office buildings for large banks and insurance companies.

== Buildings and structures ==
=== LaSalle Street ===
Location	Name	Year built	Stories	Contributing
LaSalle Street and the Chicago River	LaSalle Street Bridge	1928	n/a	Yes
222 North LaSalle	Builders Building	1927 (original) / 1986 (renovation)	26	Yes
221 North LaSalle	LaSalle–Wacker Building	1930	41	Yes
203 North LaSalle	Loop Transportation Center	1986	27	No
200 North LaSalle		1984	30	No
180 North LaSalle	Heitman Centre	1972	40	No
160 North LaSalle	Bilandic Building	1924 / 1992	20	Yes
134 North LaSalle	Eitel Building	1926	22	Yes
121 North LaSalle	City Hall - County Building	1908 / 1911	11	Yes
120 North LaSalle	120 North LaSalle	1991	40	No
100 North LaSalle	100 North LaSalle Street Building	1928	25	Yes
33 North LaSalle	Foreman State National Bank Building	1930	38	Yes
30 North LaSalle	30 North LaSalle	1975	43	No
2 North LaSalle		1979	26	No
1 North LaSalle	One North LaSalle	1930	49	Yes
10 South LaSalle	10 South LaSalle	1989	37	No
11 South LaSalle	Roanoke Building	1915 / 1922 / 1926 (final tower addition)	35	Yes
19 South LaSalle	YMCA Building	1893 / 1913		Yes
29 South LaSalle	Equitable Life Building	1902 / 1940	12	Yes
39 South LaSalle	New York Life Insurance Building	1894 / 1898 / 1903	14	Yes
50 South LaSalle	Northern Trust Company Building	1905 / 1928 / 1967	12	Yes
120 South LaSalle	State Bank of Chicago	1928	22	Yes
135 South LaSalle	Field Building	1934	42	Yes
190 South LaSalle	U.S. Bank Building	1987	42	No
208 South LaSalle	Continental and Commercial National Bank	1914	20	Yes
209 South LaSalle	Rookery Building	1888 / 1992	11	Yes
230 South LaSalle	Federal Reserve Bank of Chicago	1922 / 1989	14	Yes
231 South LaSalle	Illinois Merchants Bank	1924	20	Yes

=== Wells Street ===
Location	Name	Year built	Stories	Contributing
201 North Wells	Trustees System Service Building	1930	28	Yes
Lake and Wells Streets	Chicago Union Loop Elevated Structure, Quincy station and Clark/Lake station	1897	n/a	Yes (excluding Clark/Lake, which was replaced in 1992)
177 North Wells	Parking Structure	1987	15	No
122 North Wells / 205 West Randolph	Randolph–Wells Building	1915 / 1928	23	Yes
40 North Wells	Washington Block	1874	5	Yes
145 South Wells	Parking Structure (to be replaced by 20-story tower)	1959	5	Yes
330 South Wells	Insurance Center Building	1927	16	Yes

=== Clark Street ===
Location	Name	Year built	Stories	Contributing
6 South Clark		1872 / 1935	4	Yes
16 South Clark	Loop Synagogue	1957		Yes
125 South Clark	Edison Building	1907	20	Yes

=== Dearborn Street ===
Location	Name	Year built	Stories	Contributing
140 South Dearborn	Marquette Building	1895 / 1905	17	Yes

=== Wacker Drive ===
Location	Name	Year built	Stories	Contributing
211 West Wacker Drive	Chicago Evening Post Building	1928	19	Yes
205 West Wacker Drive	Engineering Building	1928	23	Yes

=== Randolph Street ===
Location	Name	Year built	Stories	Contributing
188 West Randolph	Randolph Tower	1929	45	Yes
100 West Randolph	James R. Thompson Center	1985	17	No

=== Washington Street ===
Location	Name	Year built	Stories	Contributing
212 West Washington	Bell Building	1912	20	Yes
208 West Washington	Morton Building	1927	21	Yes
188 West Washington		1980	1	No
180 West Washington	Equitable Building	1927	12	Yes
176 West Washington	Elks Club Building	1917	14	Yes
175 West Washington	Chicago Federation of Musicians Building	1933 / 1949	3	Yes
170 West Washington		1875 / 1952	4	Yes
166 West Washington		1872 / 1930	7	Yes
111 West Washington	Burnham Center	1913	21	Yes
77 West Washington	Chicago Temple Building	1923	21	Yes

=== Madison Street ===
Location	Name	Year built	Stories	Contributing
123 West Madison	Advertising Building	1914 / 1929	22	Yes
120 West Madison	120 Madison Building	1906 / 1963	14	Yes
110 West Madison	St. Peter's in the Loop	1953	5	Yes
105 West Madison	Loop Center Building	1929	23	Yes

=== Monroe Street ===
Location	Name	Year built	Stories	Contributing
205 West Monroe	Williams Building	1898	10	Yes
185 West Monroe	Parking Structure	1964	3	No
111 West Monroe	Harris Bank complex including Harris Bank Addition II	1911 / 1974	38	Yes
100 West Monroe	100 West Monroe Building	1927	22	Yes
79 West Monroe	Rector Building	1905 / 1924	13	Yes

=== Adams Street ===
Location	Name	Year built	Stories	Contributing
180 West Adams	Textile Building	1911 or 1912	8	Yes
172 West Adams	Midland Building	1927	22	Yes
172 West Adams	Midland Hotel (Chicago)	1938 (hotel conversion)	22	Yes
105 West Adams	Clark Adams Building	1927	41	Yes

=== Jackson Boulevard ===
Location	Name	Year built	Stories	Contributing
226 West Jackson Boulevard	Chicago & Northwestern Railroad Building	1905	14	Yes
223 West Jackson Boulevard	Brooks Building	1910	12	Yes
216 West Jackson Boulevard	Jackson-Quincy Court	1900 / 1931	10	Yes
209 West Jackson Boulevard	McKinlock Building	1893 / 1918	12	Yes
200 West Jackson Boulevard		1970	28	No
175 West Jackson Boulevard	Insurance Exchange Building	1912 / 1928	21	Yes
141 West Jackson Boulevard	Chicago Board of Trade Building	1930 / 1997	44	Yes
111 West Jackson Boulevard	Trans Union Building	1961	24	Yes

=== Van Buren Street ===
Location	Name	Year built	Stories	Contributing
212 West Van Buren	Van Buren Building	1893	10	Yes

== Works cited ==
- Euer, Danielle (March 8, 2013). "National Register of Historic Places Registration Form: West Loop - LaSalle Street Historic District" (PDF). Illinois Historic Preservation Agency. Archived from the original (PDF) on January 3, 2020.
- Randall, Frank Alfred (1999). History of the Development of Building Construction in Chicago. University of Illinois Press. ISBN 9780252024160.
- Sinkevitch, Alice (2004). AIA Guide to Chicago (2nd ed.). Harcourt, Inc. ISBN 9780156029087.
