= The Midland Hotel, Chicago =

Historic hotel in Chicago, Illinois, United States

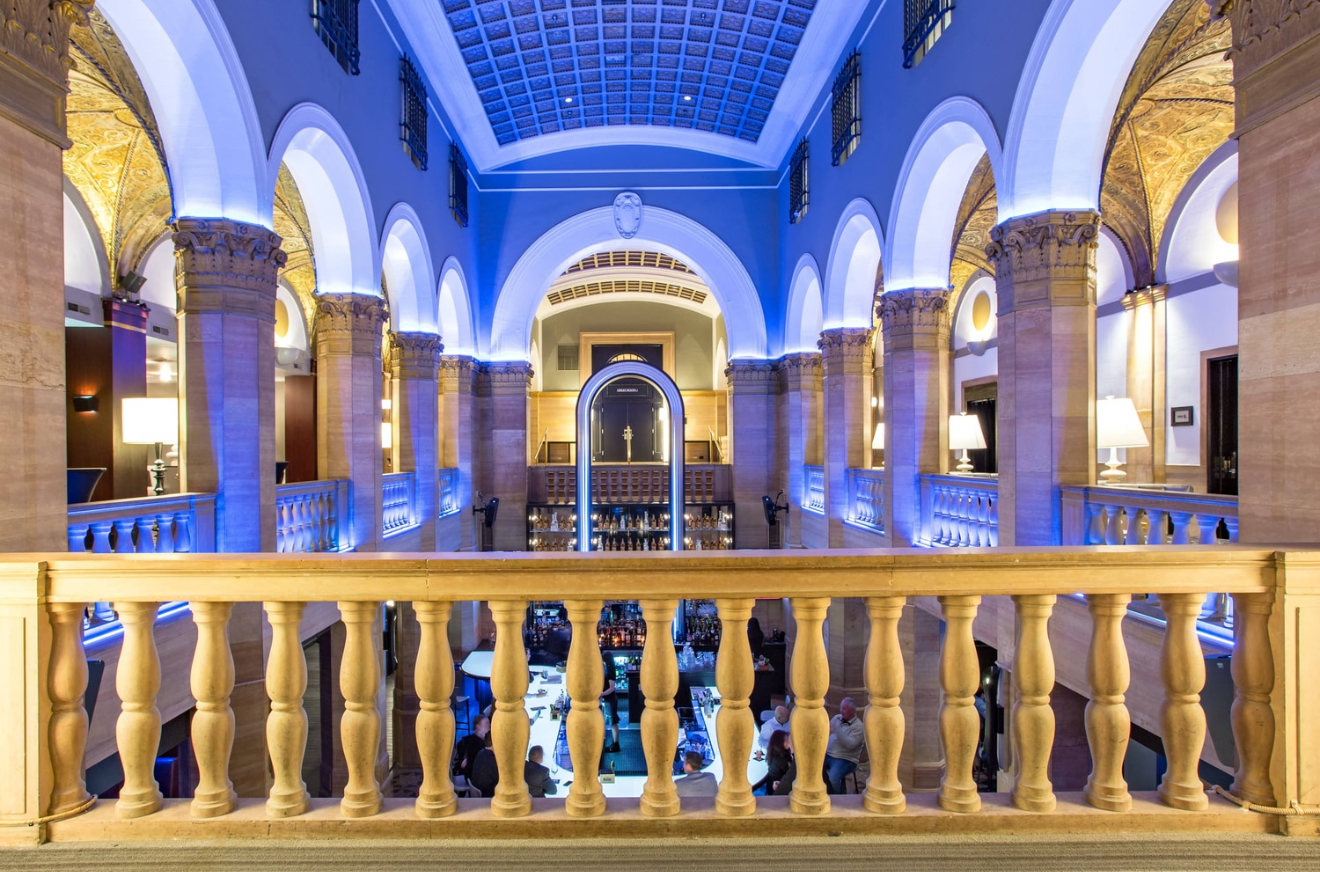
- Interior of The Midland Hotel, Chicago
- Interactive map of the The Midland Hotel, Chicago area
- Former names: Midland Building (1927–1938); W Chicago – City Center (2000–2024)

General information
- Status: Completed
- Architectural style: Italian Renaissance Revival
- Location: 172 West Adams Street, Chicago, Illinois, U.S.
- Coordinates: 41°52′47″N 87°37′59″W
- Completed: 1927

Technical details
- Floor count: 22

Design and construction
- Architect: Karl M. Vitzthum
- Designations

U.S. Historic district – Contributing property
- Official name: West Loop–LaSalle Street Historic District
- Designated: June 1, 2013
- Reference no.: 12001238

The Midland Hotel, Chicago is a historic hotel located at 172 West Adams Street in the Chicago Loop. Completed in 1927 as the Midland Building, the 22-story structure was designed by architect Karl M. Vitzthum in the Italian Renaissance Revival style. Developed as a private club and office building, it was converted into a hotel in 1938.

The property operated as the W Chicago – City Center from 2000 to 2024 and returned to its historic name in 2025 under Marriott International’s Tribute Portfolio. The building is a contributing property within the West Loop–LaSalle Street Historic District, listed on the National Register of Historic Places.

== History ==
=== Midland Building and Club (1927–1938) ===
The Midland Building was originally planned as a taller tower but was completed at 22 stories. The first six floors housed the Midland Club, a private businessmen’s club, while upper floors were rented as office space.

In 1932 the American Chemical Society’s Chicago Section used the club as its headquarters before relocating in 1934 to the Stevens Hotel (now Hilton Chicago).

The Midland Club did not achieve the prominence of older Loop clubs and dissolved during the Great Depression. The club’s legacy was later referenced by the W Chicago – City Center, which opened the restaurant Midland Social Club in 2018.

=== The Midland Hotel (1938–1996) ===
In 1938 Chicago hotel executive Philip Pekow leased the former club space and opened the Midland Hotel. Over time the hotel expanded to occupy the first twelve floors. Pekow remained associated with the property for decades; his obituary in the Chicago Tribune described him as a veteran hotel executive based on Adams Street.

The Midland became a familiar Loop venue for banquets, business meetings, and civic gatherings. A 1944 renovation updated guestrooms and restored the main entrance. In 1959 it hosted a major banquet for the Chicago Police Digest.

=== Civic and cultural role ===
On July 27, 1965, the Midland hosted the first public meeting of Mattachine Midwest, one of the Midwest’s early LGBTQ rights organizations. Approximately 140 people attended, and the group launched both a newsletter and a 24-hour helpline at the meeting.

=== W Chicago – City Center (2000–2024) ===
In 1996 Starwood Hotels & Resorts acquired the building and converted it into a W-branded hotel. It reopened in 2000 as the W Chicago – City Center.

A major renovation in 2018 refreshed the lobby and public areas and opened the Midland Social Club restaurant as an homage to the former Midland Club.

=== Return to The Midland Hotel, Chicago (2025–present) ===
In January 2025 the hotel was renamed The Midland Hotel, Chicago under Marriott International’s Tribute Portfolio. The rebrand was accompanied by a two-phase renovation. Phase I emphasized restoration of historic features in public areas, while Phase II focused on modernization of guestrooms and meeting space.

== Architecture ==
The Midland Building is an Italian Renaissance Revival design with a limestone façade, prominent arched openings at street level, and a bracketed cornice line. Its U-shaped plan creates an interior light well opening to the east.

Architect Karl M. Vitzthum designed several prominent Chicago buildings, including One North LaSalle and the Steuben Club Building.
