= WMOR =

WMOR may refer to:

- WMOR-FM, a radio station (106.1 FM) licensed to serve Morehead, Kentucky
- WMOR (Chicago), an FM radio station (102.7 FM) in Chicago, Illinois (1949–1952)
- WMOR-TV, a television station (channel 32) licensed to serve Lakeland, Florida
- WMOR (AM), a defunct radio station (1330 AM) formerly licensed to serve Morehead, Kentucky
