= 10 South LaSalle =

Office skyscraper in Chicago, Illinois

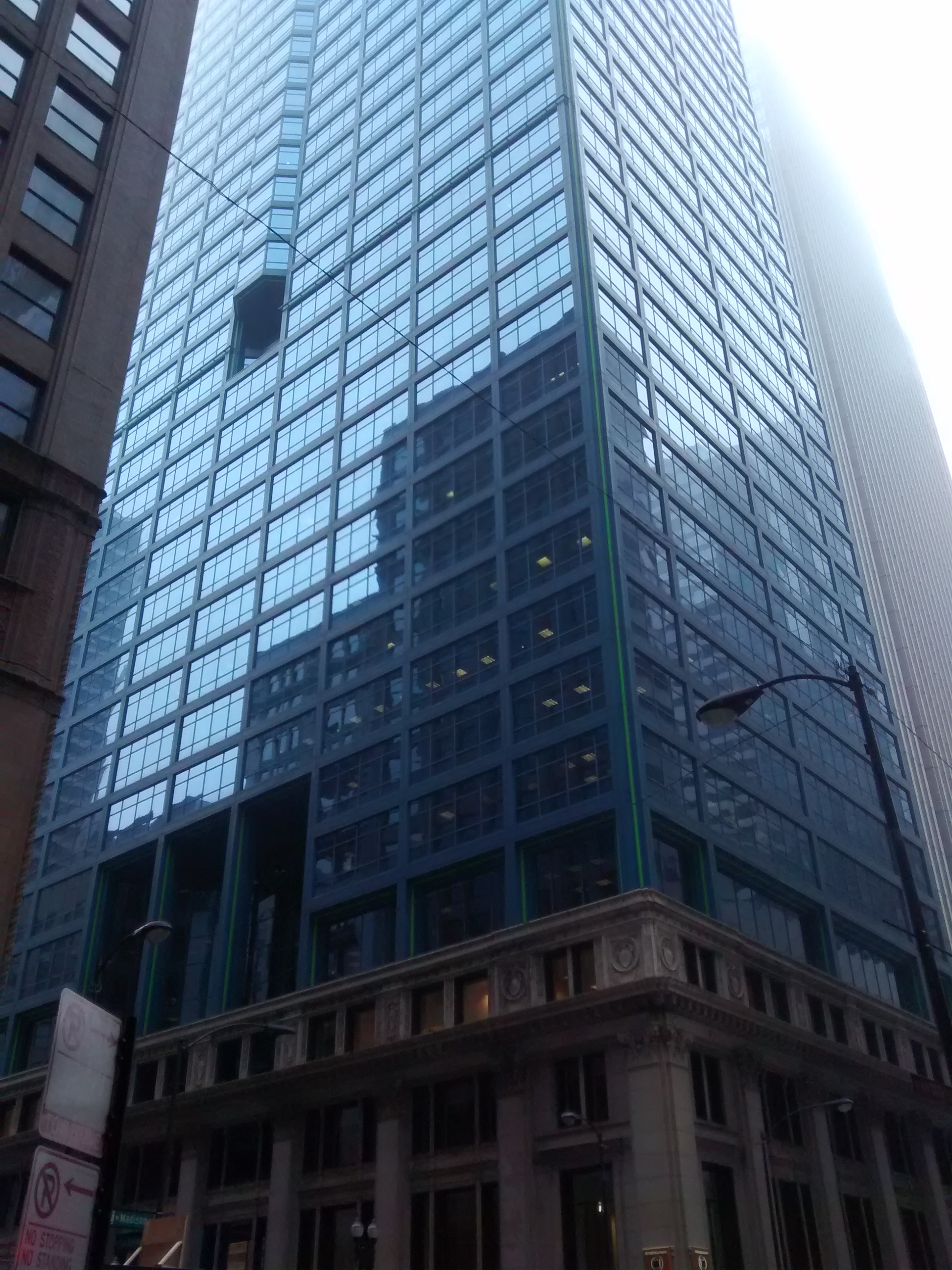

- Location within Downtown Chicago Location within Illinois Location within the United States

General information
- Type: Office
- Location: 10 South LaSalle Street, Chicago, Illinois
- Coordinates: 41°52′54″N 87°37′58″W
- Completed: 1989
- Inaugurated: 1986

Height
- Height: 502 feet (153 m)

Technical details
- Floor count: 37

Design and construction
- Architecture firm: Moriyama & Teshima Architects

10 South LaSalle (formerly Chemical Plaza, Manufacturers Hanover Plaza, and Chase Plaza) is a 502-foot-tall (153 m) skyscraper in the LaSalle Street financial district of Chicago, Illinois. It was completed in 1989 and has 37 floors, and is tied with One Superior Place for the 124th tallest building in the city.

The building is owned by The Feil Organization, which purchased it from MetLife in 2002 for $139.4 million. In 2025, Wilmington Trust moved to foreclose on the building over an unpaid $105 million loan.

== Architecture ==
The first four floors of the facade along Madison and LaSalle streets are made of the original marble facade from the Otis Building, the previous building on this site. The remainder of the facade is a dark cobalt blue with details in bright green. The east wall has two additional distinguishing features, a "zipper" of bay windows that run from the 19th floor to the top, and a semicircular indentation that runs from sidewalk level to the seventh floor.

Moriyama & Teshima Architects designed this building, making it the tallest building in Chicago designed by a Canadian architecture firm. Holabird & Root, whose predecessor firm had designed the Otis Building on the site in 1912, served as associate architects.

The use of the lower facade of the Otis Building, an example of facadism, has received mixed reviews. Chicago Tribune architecture critic Paul Gapp lauded the reuse of the old facade as a brave gamble that paid off and "fits its financial canyon environs in fine fashion and friendly compatibility." Gapp particularly hailed the work of the structural engineering firm Cohen-Barreto-Marchertas in preserving the Otis Building's perimeter caissons. Gapp's successor Blair Kamin, in contrast, named it among downtown Chicago's ugliest buildings, calling it a "garish intruder" that "disrupts the stately architectural canyon of LaSalle Street with its blue and Ghostbusters-green upper stories". To Kamin, the mismatch between the old and new facades was "an object lesson in why facade-ectomies don't work."

== Vicinity ==
10 South LaSalle is located at the southwest corner of Madison and LaSalle streets in the LaSalle Street financial district. The LaSalle Street corridor is often referred to as a "canyon" due to the high number of skyscrapers there.

Within the block, 10 South LaSalle adjoins 181 West Madison to the west and the Northern Trust Company Building to the south. Across the street, it faces Two North LaSalle (former site of the LaSalle Hotel) to the north, One North LaSalle to the northeast, and 11 South LaSalle to the east.

10 South LaSalle was built slightly earlier than its neighbor at 181 West Madison, and it was originally anticipated that both buildings might be part of a common design. As a result, the lobby at the western entrance, which faces onto a narrow pedestrian alley between the buildings, is more spacious than the lobby facing LaSalle Street.

Although the building is within the West Loop–LaSalle Street Historic District, it is considered a "non-contributing" property due to its having been built so recently.

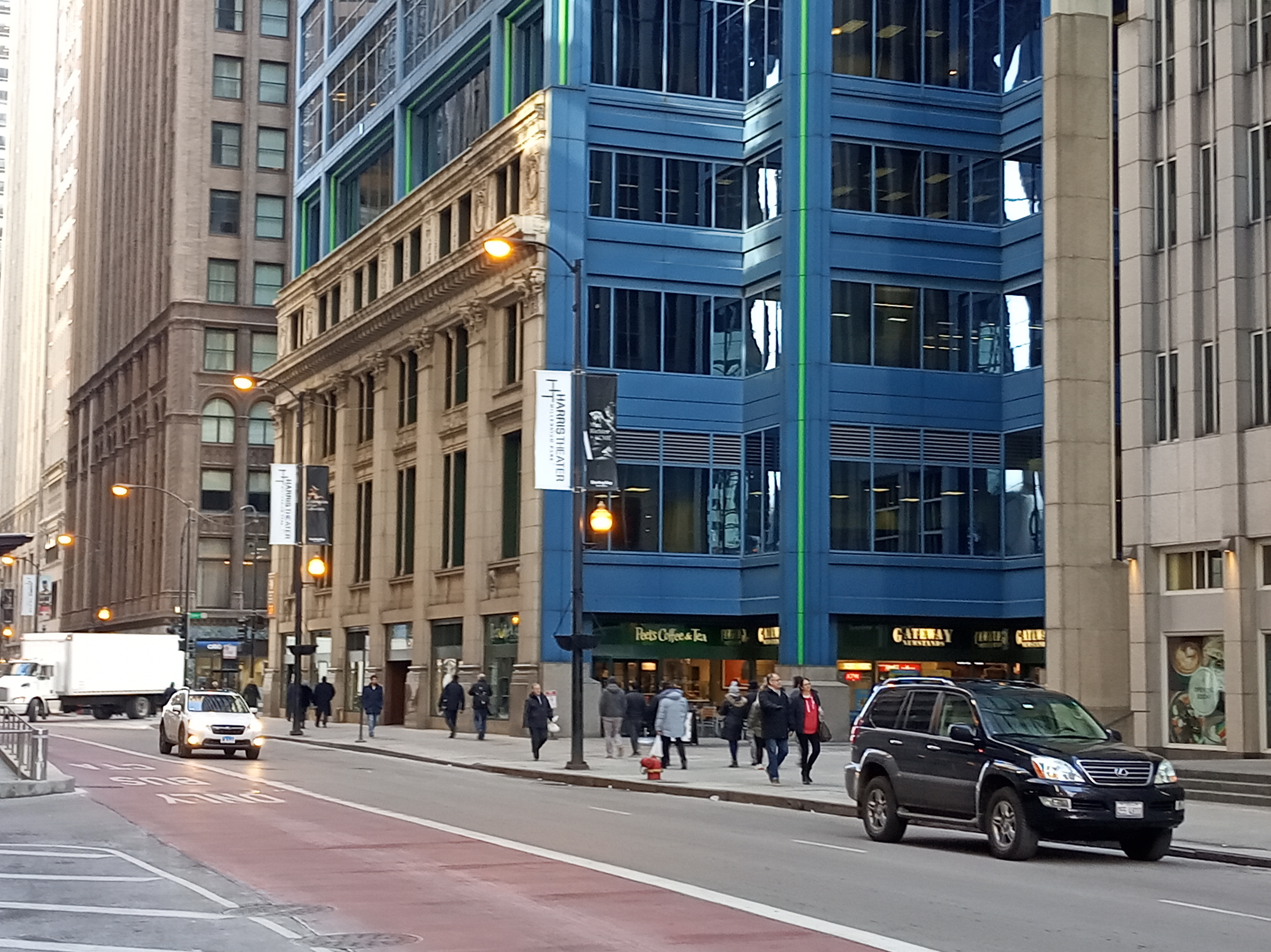
North facade on Madison Street

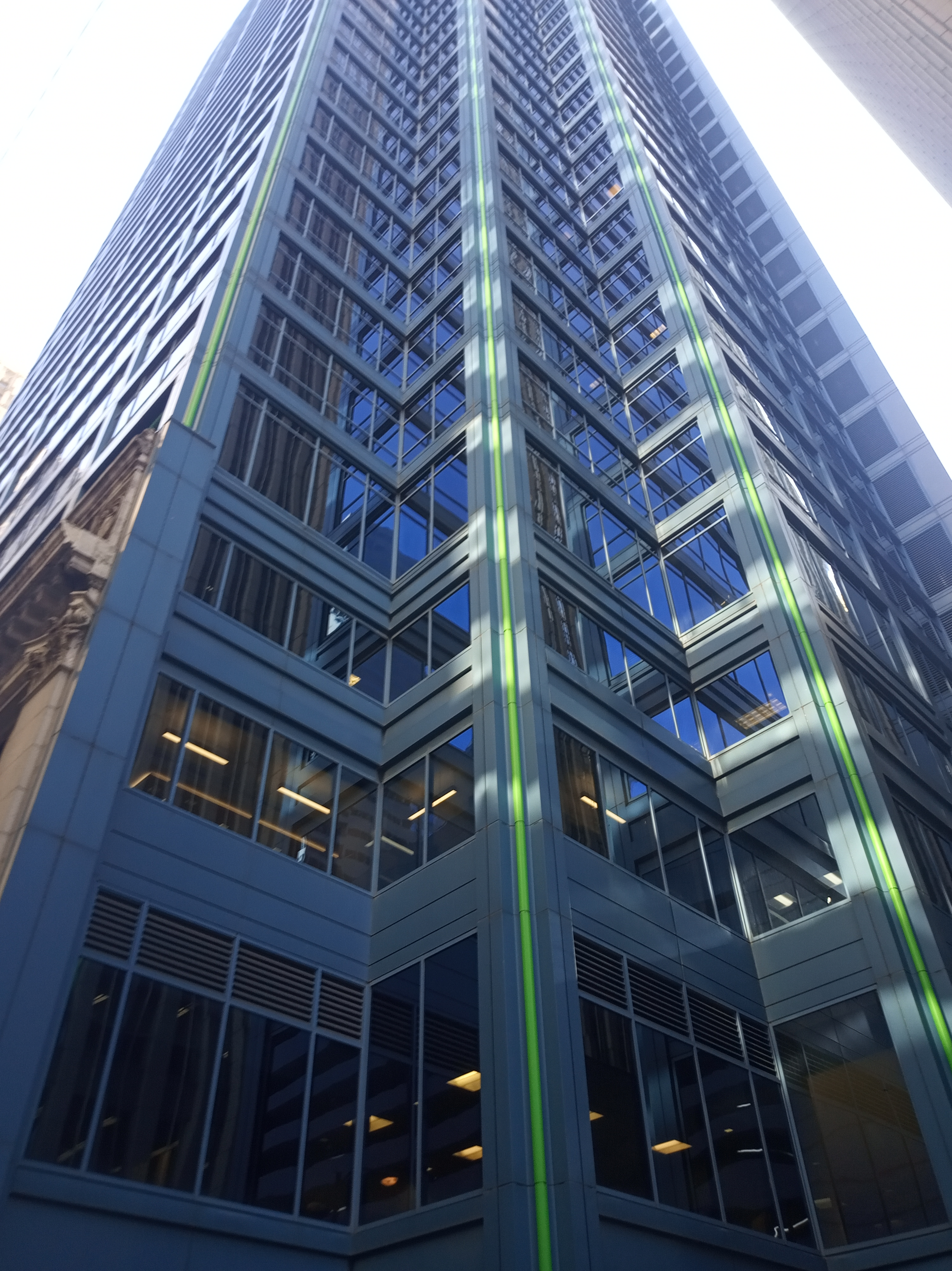
Looking up from northwest corner

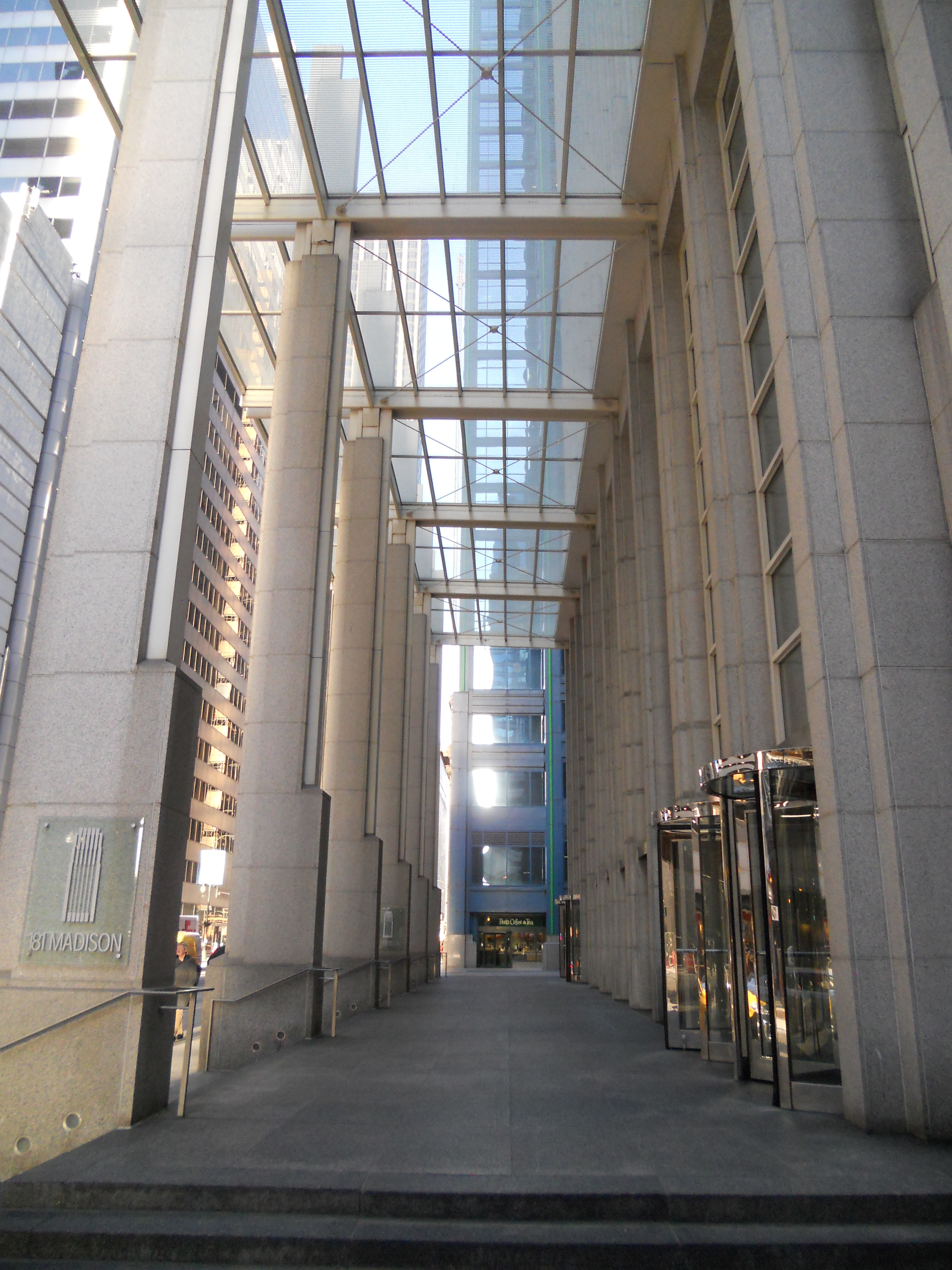
View toward 10 South LaSalle from 181 West Madison arcade

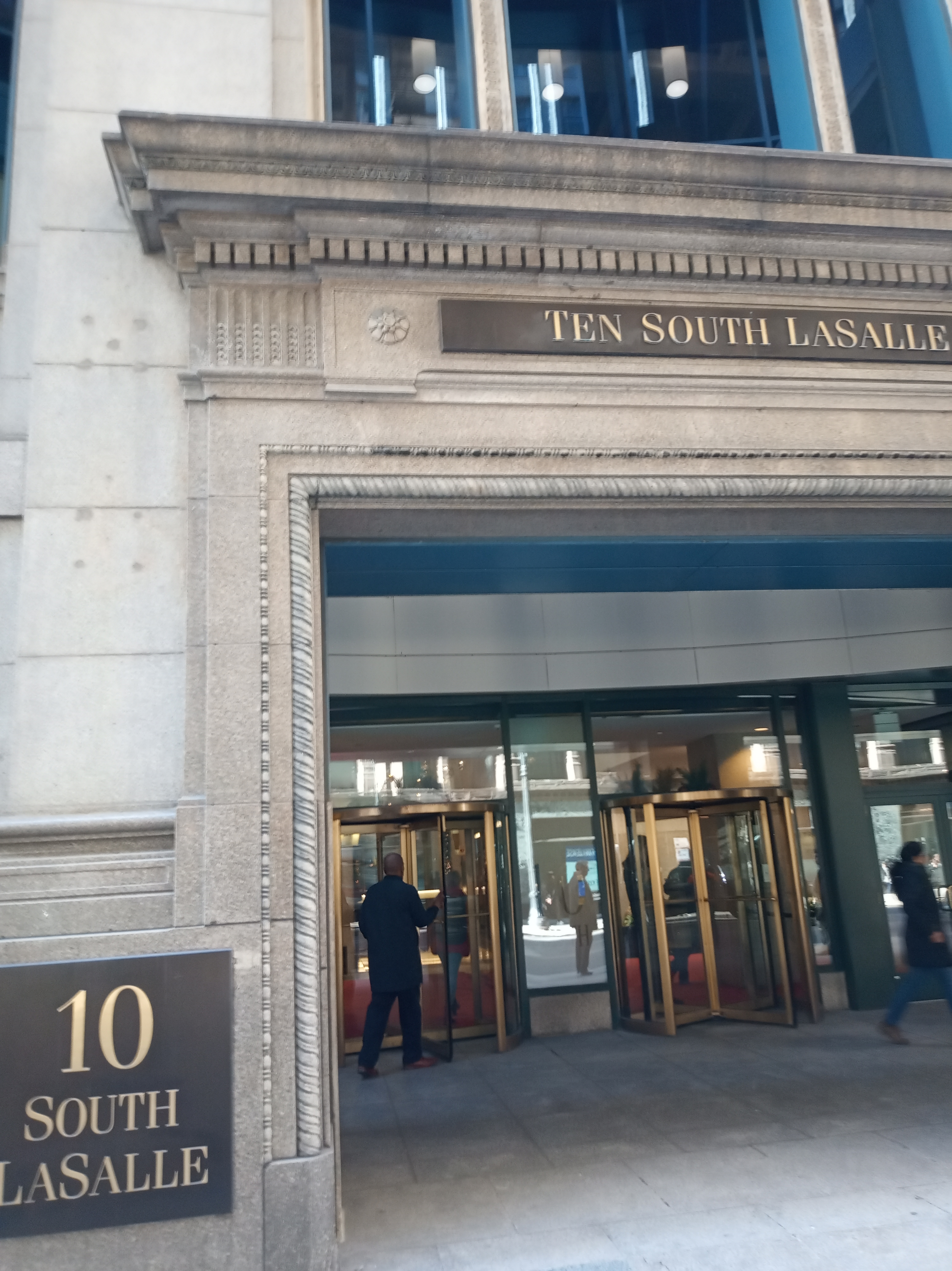
East entrance on LaSalle Street

== See also ==
- List of tallest buildings in Chicago
