= ALIVE Rescue =

- Formation: 2008
- Legal status: Non-profit
- Location: Chicago, Illinois
- President: Kristen Gerali
- Revenue: $570k USD (2024)
- Website: https://www.aliverescue.org/

ALIVE Rescue is a non-profit animal rescue organization based in the Midwestern United States, founded by Kristen Gerali in 2008. It is a non-lethal shelter that provides rehoming services, physical and behavioral rehabilitation, and medical care for homeless, senior, and special-needs animals.

== History ==
Kristen Gerali, founder and president of ALIVE Rescue, began working with animals in shelters after visiting New Orleans following Hurricane Katrina to help rehabilitate affected pets. For a couple of years, she volunteered at a local shelter near her home that was shut down after the founder passed away. She later volunteered at other local shelters until she started her own.

Gerali founded ALIVE Rescue on March 20, 2008, and ran the organization through foster homes until May 2013, when they opened their first adoption center in Chicago’s Roscoe Village neighborhood: "The Little Barn." They operated there until 2019, when they partnered with Pooch Hotel Dog Boarding Service to open a new adoption center in the hotel's storefront. "The Little Barn" was closed in June; soon after, they opened a new center in the Chicago West Loop called the "AC"- an acronym for "adoption center."

In 2016, ALIVE Rescue was donated a 70-acre, 4,800-square-foot barn in Salem Lakes, Wisconsin, to increase the number of rescued animals. On August 26, 2023, they officially opened "The Big Barn," expanding their shelter housing by an estimated 30 dogs. It includes cat suites, suites designed for senior, pregnant, or behaviorally challenged dogs, and indoor play areas. The Rescue House, next door to "The Big Barn," also contains individual sleeping rooms with 24-hour medical care.

== Events ==
ALIVE Rescue hosts events at The Big Barn and partners with local restaurants to host adoption events that increase adoptions. They host an annual “Shelter Shiver” event, partnered with runners looking to fundraise during races, and sell merchandise to raise money.

The "Shelter Shiver" is an annual event hosted by ALIVE Rescue in Chicago and Wisconsin to raise money for the non-profit's pet and medical needs. The fundraiser challenges participants to jump into the cold lake either as a group or on their own. After the plunge, the non-profit hosts a party featuring prizes, snacks, and a meal. Most prizes are often given to top donors and contest winners, such as the “best costume” contest or “best team theme” contest. Since 2009, ALIVE Rescue has held the annual Shelter Shiver at Chicago's Lake Michigan and nearby restaurants; however, since expanding to Wisconsin because of The Big Barn, ALIVE began an additional annual Shelter Shiver event at Wisconsin's Turtle Lake and Grill in 2021.

=== Partner Events ===
ALIVE Rescue has partnered with many different organizations. They have collaborated with pet-oriented organizations such as pet foundations, retailers, hotels, and animal hospitals. ALIVE Rescue has also partnered with sports and tech-related organizations to raise funds for the non-profit through charity events.

On September 14, 2018, ALIVE Rescue partnered with Kenway Consulting– a technology consulting firm–to raise money for the non-profit through a Charity Golf Outing fundraiser. Through this golfing event, Kenway Consulting raised $36,000 for ALIVE Rescue; and approximately $100,000 over three years. This event included a raffle with cash prizes and other gifts, including hotel getaways and tickets to sporting events. Likewise, the event featured a “Puppy Kissing Booth” with adoptable pets from the ALIVE Rescue shelter.

In 2019, Everybody's Coffee hosted their annual "Happy Pawlidays" with Savy Laiser, a Chicago-local author as a fundraising event for ALIVE Rescue. The event included stuffed animals, customizable ornaments and other holiday goods for sale.

During the 2023 NFL season, the Chicago Bears partnered with ALIVE Rescue for their Touchdown For Tails initiative. This charity segment raised donations for the ALIVE Rescue non-profit through prop bets and Chicago Bears wins. If people hit the prop, $10 was donated, and if they missed, $5 was donated; if the Bears won, $25 was donated. Also, fans and readers were free to donate to any of the featured organizations for an opportunity to win a Bears Jersey.

== Programs and Partnerships ==
ALIVE concentrates on supporting animal and community welfare by administering and partnering with other organizations on programs, including “The HUTCH” program in 2017, which expanded rescue efforts from cats and dogs to rabbits. The Parvo Prevention Project (PPP) launched in 2018 to reduce parvovirus and leptospirosis rates in targeted neighborhoods by vaccinating three thousand dogs. ALIVE works with the Chicago Animal Control Center (CACC) and other local shelters to provide pet care services to community members and families in order to reduce the number of animals surrendered.

In 2020, ALIVE Rescue Chicago was forced to shut down their adoption center due to the lack of space to meet the social distancing guidelines. In an effort to keep the non-profit running, ALIVE Rescue partnered with Paradise 4 Paws, a dog and cat resort that offers day and overnight care services and behavior training near Chicago's airports. Together, the two organizations launched “Operation RESCUE-19,” a program that allowed ALIVE Rescue to temporarily relocate their adoption center and rescued pets to Paradise 4 Paws' Midway Airport location. ALIVE Rescue provided the Paradise 4 Paws staff with pay and brought their own trained team members into the Midway location. The 20,000-square-foot Midway location could accommodate an estimated 75 dogs and 12 cats and included three indoor play spaces. Before being taken into foster or adoptive homes, rescued animals were evaluated for health and given medical attention.

=== Partnerships ===
- Tito's Handmade Vodka
- Mode Events
- Live Like Roo
- Doris Day Animal Foundation
- PetCo Foundation
- Bissell Pet Foundation

=== Supporters ===
- Premier Veterinary Group
- Companion Animal Hospital - River North
- Anything is Pawzible
- Dog Behavior Solutions, Inc. Reward Based Teachings
- Chicago Dog Walkers (Dog Walkers & Pet Sitters)
- Kimberly Kingen Photography
- Courtney Michelle Laper Photographer
- Kim Walks Dogs (Dog Walkers & Pet Sitters)
- Lost Pet USA
- Doggy Style Pet Shop
- Dogly
- Hannah Dunsirn Photography
- Wes Henry
- Happy Camper
