= Dario Toffenetti =

American restaurateur (1889–1962)

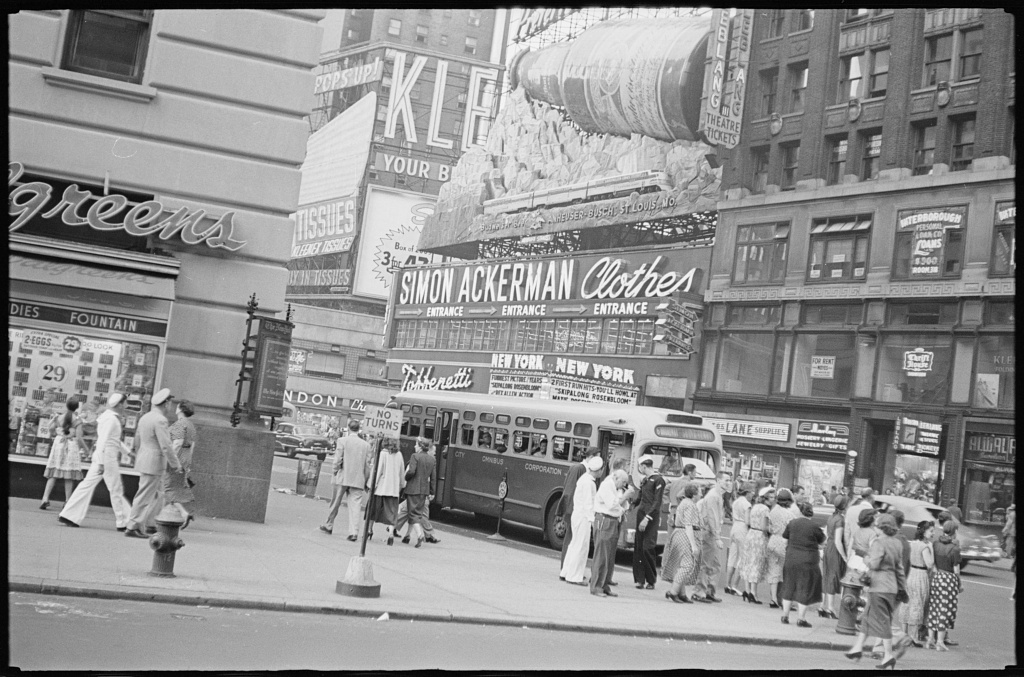
The Toffenetti restaurant at 4 Times Square, as seen in 1952

Dario Louis Toffenetti (January 20, 1889 – January 16, 1962) was an American restaurateur. His Toffenetti restaurant group operated in Chicago, New York City—including a location on Times Square—and St. Petersburg, Florida. He was recognized as a booster of Idaho potatoes and known for the prose on his menus.

== Restaurants ==
Toffenetti was born on January 20, 1889, in Mezzana, Trentino, Italy. His family operated a restaurant in nearby Trento. After a short stint working in a mine in Wisconsin, where he sold potatoes, he returned to his native Italy. Toffenetti returned to the US from Italy in 1910 and was hired as a bus boy at Chicago's Sherman House Hotel. He worked in restaurants in Chicago and Cincinnati before opening his own restaurant in 1914 at 106 W. Monroe Street in Chicago. Toffenetti believed the middle market was underserved by Chicago's existing restaurants. At this first restaurant, known as the Triangle, he generated business by putting sugar-cured hams in the window. By 1920, he owned the Triangle Restaurant on the first floor and a cafeteria on the second floor. The chain of Triangle restaurants grew to seven locations by 1939, including one at the Century of Progress international exhibition in 1933.

Toffenetti expanded to New York City in 1939 with a location at the 1939 New York World's Fair. A 24-hour Toffenetti restaurant opened on Times Square, on the southeast Broadway and 43rd Street, on August 6, 1940. The modernist building, designed by the firm of Walker & Gillette or by Skidmore, Owings & Merrill and featuring murals by Hugh Troy, was said to seat 850 people or 1,000. Toffenetti purchased the building housing the restaurant for $2.225 million in 1944. In 1949, Toffenetti reported that the Times Square restaurant served 212,000 pounds (96,000 kg) of ham, used some 462,000 Idaho potatoes, and went through 843,000 quarts of strawberries in the 10-week strawberry shortcake season.

Toffenetti's restaurants were known for the florid prose on their menus. He had studied marketing at Northwestern University and knew how to make food appealing to potential diners. He described strawberries in his strawberry shortcake as "the most gorgeous, tempting, red translucent berries", spaghetti as "one hundred yards of happiness", and baked potatoes as having "a perfect, fervid mealiness which melts rapidly the abundance of butter that we serve". Toffenetti was credited with popularizing Idaho potatoes during the years following the Great Depression, where their size made them attractive to diners as a bargain. He claimed that the governor of Idaho wrote him annually to thank him for using the state's potatoes, was appointed an honorary marshal of the Idaho Vigilantes, and received a special award from the Idaho Potato Commission and an honorary degree from the University of Idaho. Author Bruce Kraig credited Toffenetti with elevating potatoes from a food for the poor into a "reputable restaurant dish". Louisiana shrimp suppliers named Toffenetti an honorary colonel.

While on vacation in St. Petersburg, Florida, in 1955, Toffenetti and son Dario Jr. bought the Floronton Hotel downtown. It reopened in November 1955 as the Toffenetti Hotel, whose restaurant seated 300 people and operated around the clock.

== Other activities and death ==
In addition to his restaurant activities, Toffenetti headed the Chicago Restaurant Association from 1936 to 1943. Toffenetti was also the lead investor in the Metropolitan Radio Corporation of Chicago, which put FM radio station WMOR on the air in March 1949. Toffenetti—who was elected chairman of the board in October 1949 after serving as honorary chairman—was involved in a controversy after the station aired a documentary on race riots. Evidently enraged by its contents, he called the studio and demanded the program be taken off the air. He was ignored in that demand and in another to destroy all transcriptions of the program. He then traveled to the studio and smashed 300 or 100 records of the program. In spite of Toffenetti's destroying the records, a tape of the interview was reported to have survived. Toffenetti resigned from the board in February 1950 after the board of directors stripped him of his authority over station affairs, charging him with "interference and censorship". His cutting ties cost the station a third of its revenue in advertising accounts he influenced, including programs he personally sponsored. Variety noted that the corporation had just authorized the issuance of new stock and that "the Toffenetti incident is expected to seriously impair sales of this latest issue". After the conflict, the entire board of directors of Metropolitan resigned, with a new board including Toffenetti elected. Toffenetti's return brought back 20% of the station's revenue. WMOR left the air in January 1952 and was put into receivership.

Toffenetti died on January 16, 1962, at the Sherman House, after suffering a stroke. At the time, he owned six restaurants in Chicago and the ventures in New York City and St. Petersburg. After his death, the Times Square restaurant was bought by developers and closed on February 4, 1968. The developers, unable to complete their plan by buying an adjoining property, instead leased the space to the Nathan's Famous's hot dog chain. In 1972, the hotel was sold and renamed by its new owners.

== Bibliography ==
- Kraig, Bruce (2017). A rich and fertile land: a history of food in America. Foods and nations. London: Reaktion books. ISBN 978-1-78023-853-1.
