= One Superior Place =

Skyscraper in Chicago, Illinois

- Interactive map of the One Superior Place area

General information
- Type: Residential
- Location: 1 West Superior Street, Chicago, Illinois
- Coordinates: 41.8955°N 87.6290°W
- Construction started: 1998
- Completed: 1999

Height
- Roof: 502 ft (153 m)

Technical details
- Floor count: 52

Design and construction
- Architect: Loewenberg + Associates

One Superior Place is a 502 ft (153m) tall skyscraper in Chicago, Illinois. It was constructed between 1998 and 1999 and has 52 floors. The building was designed by Loewenberg + Associates, and it is tied with 10 South LaSalle as the 124th tallest building in Chicago.

The property is managed by Greystar Real Estate Partners.

The main floor of the building includes approximately four shops, while the upper floors are residential apartments. There is a five level above-ground self-park parking garage which offers parking on a daily and monthly basis, and an underground parking garage.

The property primarily consists of residential rental properties, but some units are offered as furnished corporate housing or vacation rentals.

== See also ==
- List of tallest buildings in Chicago
