= Builders Building =

Building in Chicago, Illinois

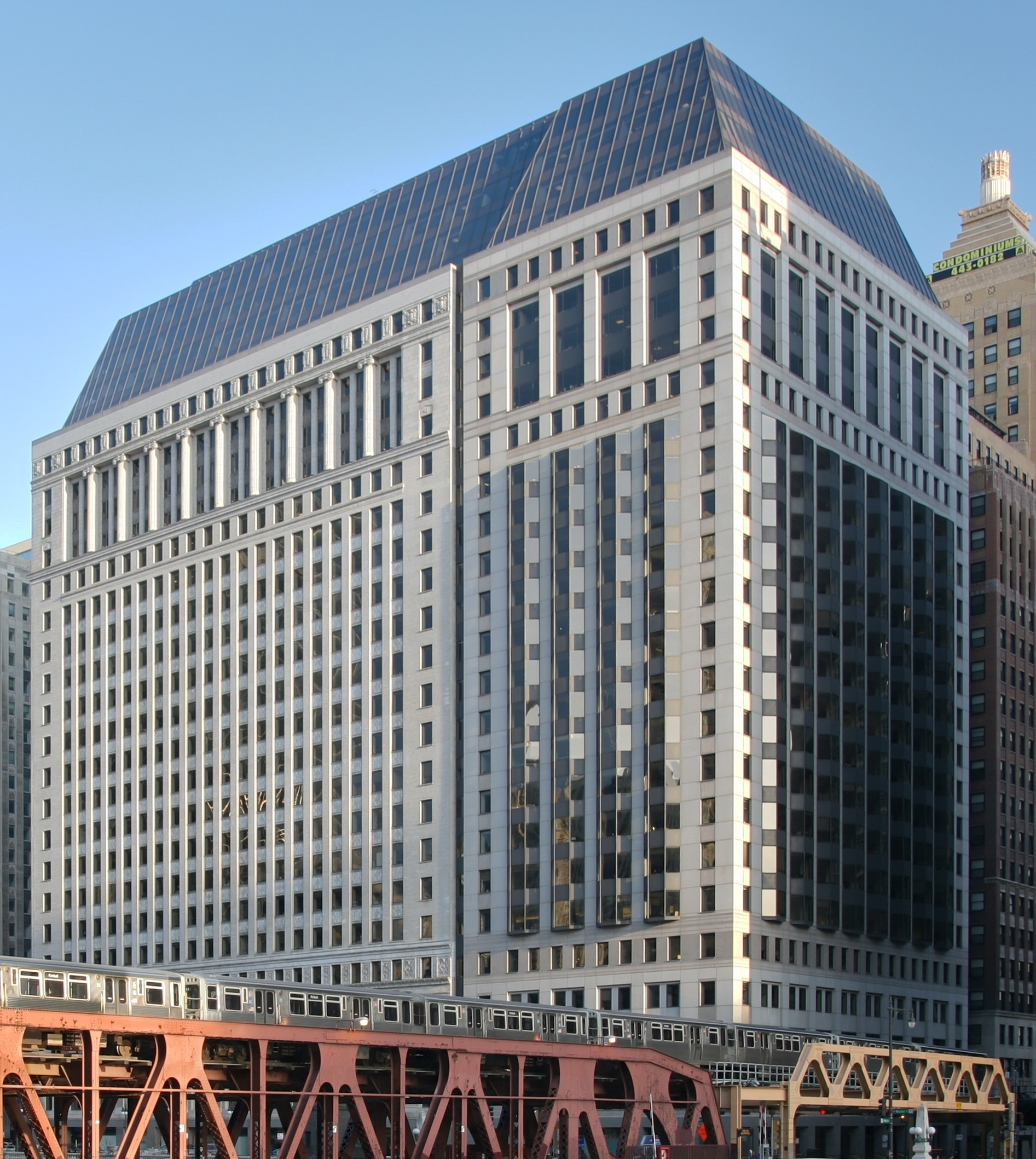
- Interactive map of the Builders Building area

General information
- Location: 222 North LaSalle Street, Chicago, Illinois, United States
- Coordinates: 41°53′11″N 87°38′00″W

Technical details
- Floor count: Originally 22, now 26
- Builders Building
- U.S. Historic district – Contributing property
- Part of: West Loop–LaSalle Street Historic District (ID12001238)
- Designated CP: June 1, 2013

222 North LaSalle, also known as the Builders Building, is a building located at 222 North LaSalle Street in the Chicago Loop. Built in 1927, it was significantly renovated between 1980 and 1986. It faces the south side of the Chicago River. A contributing property to the West Loop–LaSalle Street Historic District since 2013, it is currently owned by Tishman Speyer.

Originally constructed with 22 stories, the renovation gave it an extra four stories and a western addition that resembles the original.

== History ==
=== Construction ===
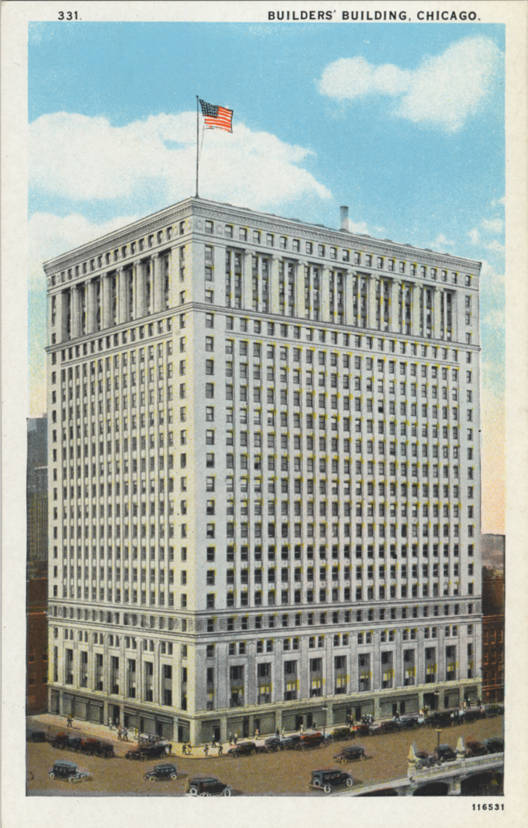
The building as it originally appeared

The building was constructed in 1927 and formally opened on June 29. Its construction was due to the efforts of the Chicago Builders' Building Corporation, which was composed of a variety of entities in the construction trade such as companies, individuals, and trade groups. It was intended to house the offices of construction companies, and included an atrium for use as an exhibition space. The design was by Graham, Anderson, Probst & White. The address was formerly 228 North LaSalle Street.

The original design is styled in the Classical Revival fashion and is 22 stories tall. Its facades are divided into three parts of base, shaft, and capital, which are separated from one another via belt courses. The base is clad in limestone while the shaft and capital have terra cotta elements. The building originally had a cornice, which has since been removed. The facades face LaSalle Street and Wacker Drive, the latter of which had recently been completed as a multi-level street. The building was built to accommodate and use this, containing an area for trucks using the lower part of Wacker Drive to make deliveries as well as an underground parking garage.

Although originally housing construction companies, the Great Depression's negative impact on the industry led to other tenants moving in. The Chicago Board of Education would eventually occupy a large portion of the building.

=== Renovation ===
The building was renovated by Skidmore, Owings & Merrill from 1980 to 1986. This was done with the collaboration of Tishman Speyer and the Crown family, who wished to open an all-suite hotel in the building to house business travelers. The so-called Puzzles Grand Club Suites was planned to open in July 1987 and comprise 62 suites occupying the sixth and seventh stories of the building; further locations in New York, Los Angeles, and San Francisco were planned to open in 1988.

The renovation gave the building an additional four stories, which are provided in a slanted glass facade set back from the originals. These stories are currently occupied by the law firm Vedder Price. It also produced an addition which reaches the same height as the rest of the building and which faces Wells Street. The addition has broadly the same architectural style as the remainder of the building, and allows the building to occupy the entirety of its half-block. Skidmore, Owings & Merrill received a citation of merit from the Chicago branch of the American Institute of Architects in 1987 for the renovation, with special attention given to the restoration of a rotunda.

The building is a contributing property to the West Loop–LaSalle Street Historic District, which was entered into the National Register of Historic Places in 2013.

The building is currently owned by Tishman Speyer. It has 960,964 square feet (89,276.5 m^{2}) of office space and a LEED Silver Certification.

== Notable Tenants ==
- Vedder Price
- Avant
- Shutan Camera Co. (1966-1983)
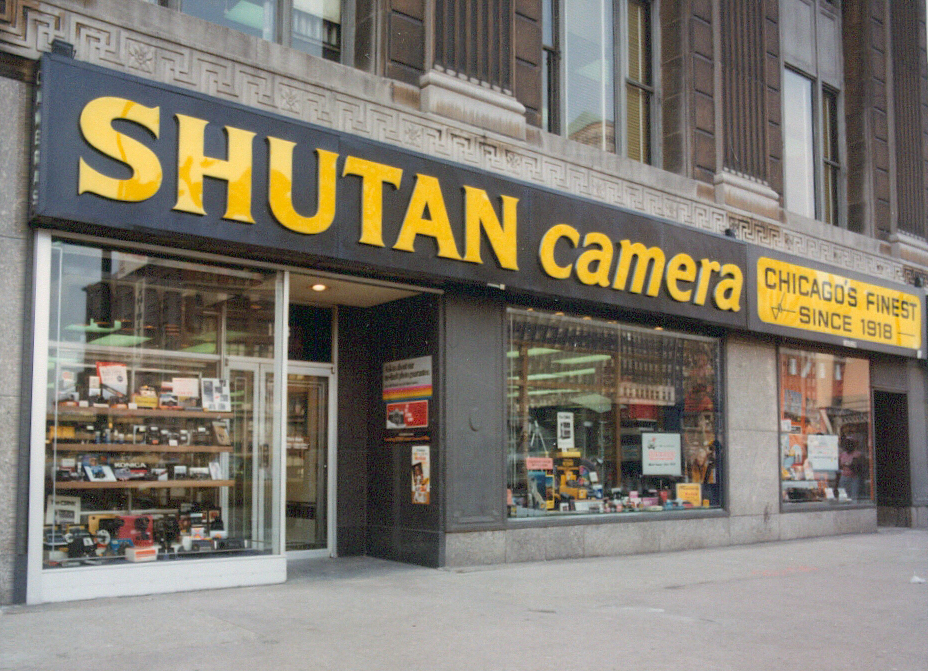
  Wacker & LaSalle Builders Building longtime tenant Shutan Camera Co. (1966 to 1983)

== Works cited ==
- West Loop-LaSalle Street Historic District (PDF) (Report). National Park Service. June 1, 2013. Archived from the original (PDF) on January 3, 2020.
