= Tacoma Building =

Office building in Chicago, Illinois

Coordinates: 41.8820°N 87.6321°W

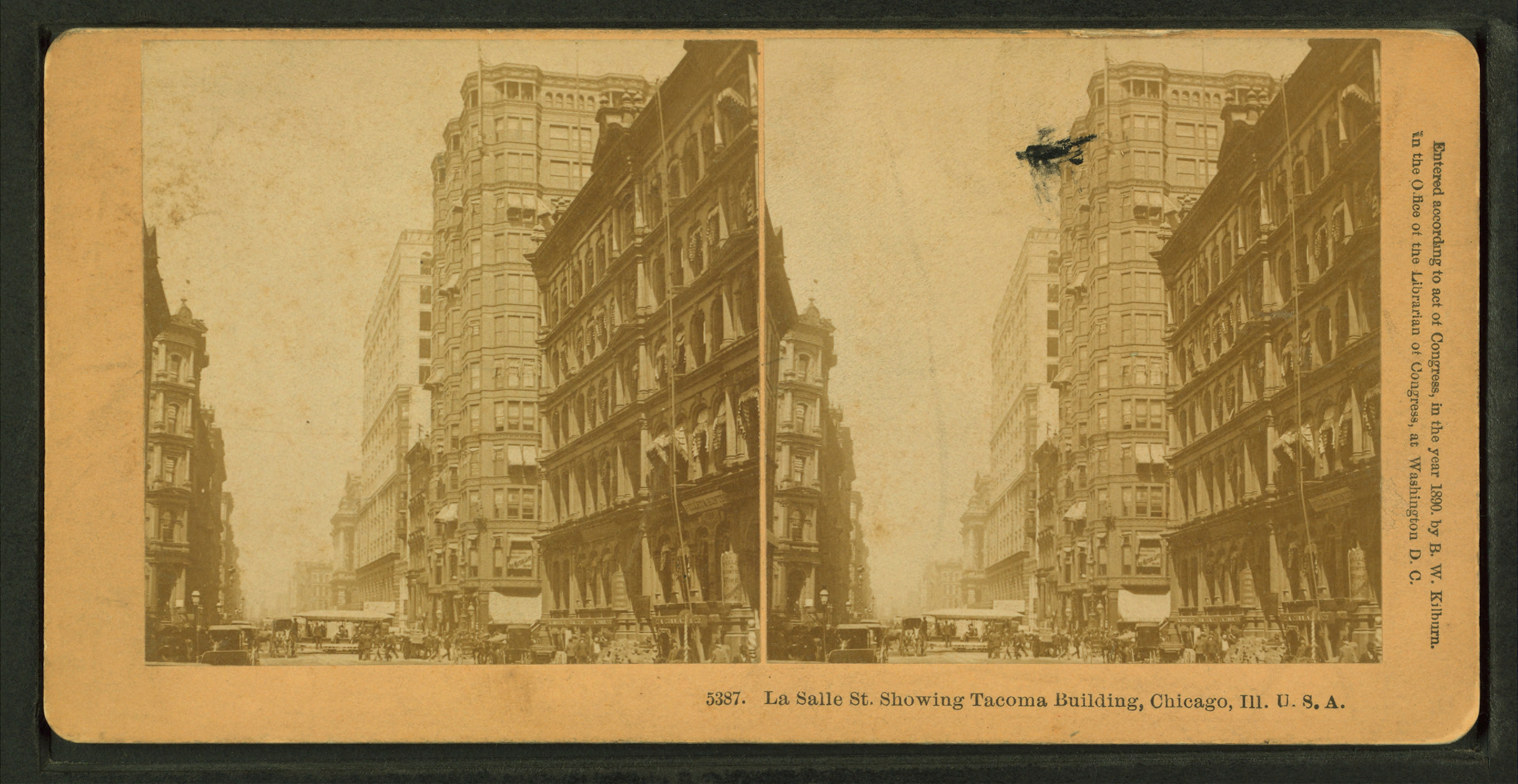
Tacoma Building (the tall building in the centre). Stereoscopic view by Benjamin W. Kilburn

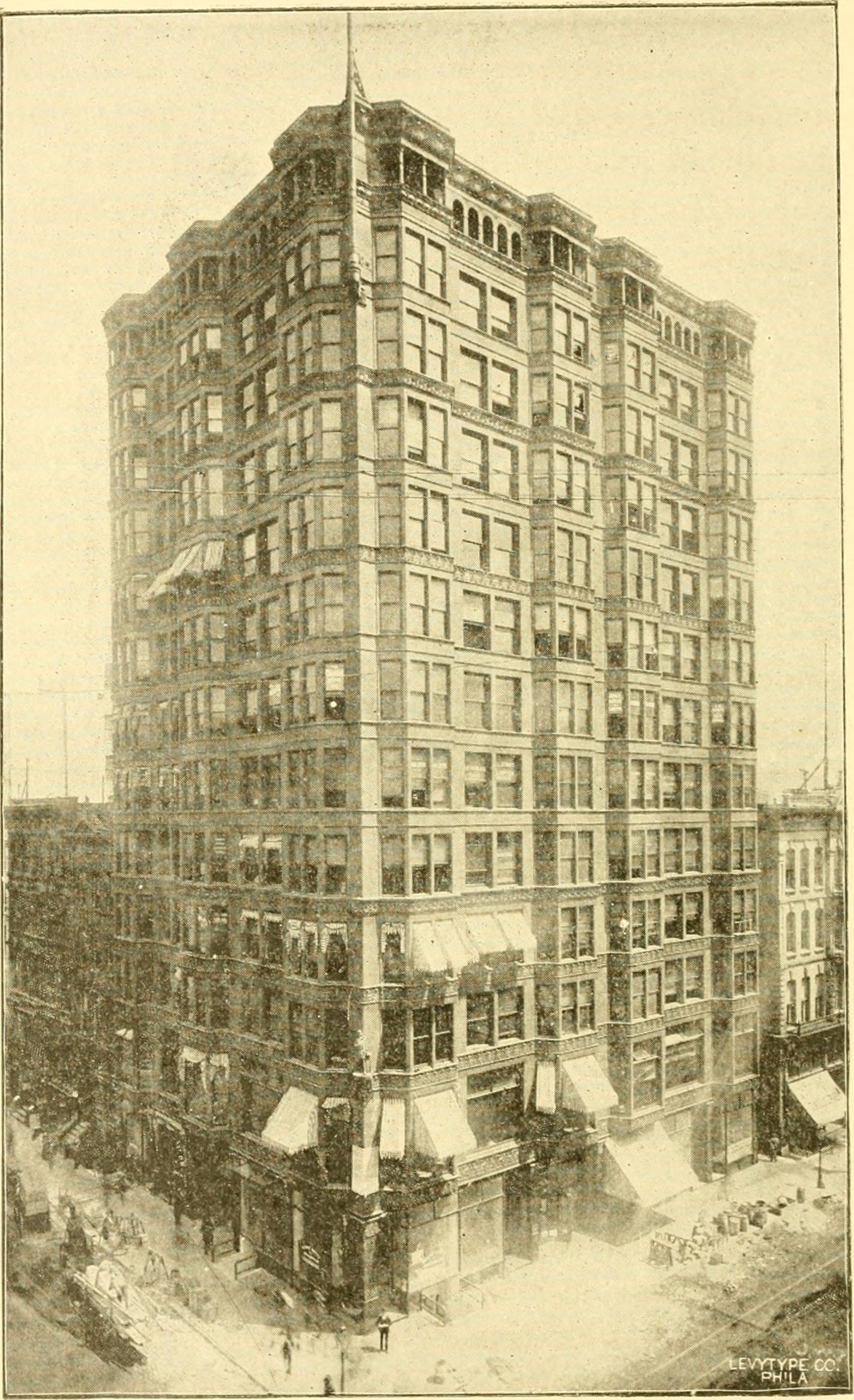
Tacoma Building, 1892

The Tacoma Building was an early skyscraper in Chicago. Completed in 1889, it was the first major building designed by the architectural firm Holabird & Roche. The Tacoma Building was demolished in 1929 to be replaced by One North LaSalle.

A pioneering building of the Chicago School, it uses a framework of iron and steel constructed by George A. Fuller with, for the first time, all its members fixed together by rivets. While internally still supported by load-bearing walls, the two facades towards LaSalle Street and Madison Street are true curtain walls. With this, Holabird & Roche's structure went beyond William LeBaron Jenney's solution for his Home Insurance Building.

After investigating the lost Chicago landmark, the National Association of Building Owners and Managers diagnosed the cause of its obsolescence to be the building's inefficient layout.

== See also ==
- Early skyscrapers
