= WMOR (AM) =

- Morehead, Kentucky; United States
- Frequency: 1330 kHz
- Branding: Sam FM

Ownership
- Owner: Morgan County Industries, Inc.
- Sister stations: WMOR-FM

History
- First air date: February 18, 1955
- Last air date: April 11, 2017
- Call sign meaning: Morehead

Technical information
- Facility ID: 73280
- Class: D
- Power: 570 watts (days only)
- Transmitter coordinates: 38°10′56″N 83°26′56″W

WMOR (1330 AM) was a radio station broadcasting an adult hits format, simulcasting WMOR-FM 106.1. Established in 1955, the station was licensed to serve Morehead, Kentucky, United States. WMOR was owned by Morgan County Industries, Inc. and featured programming from Westwood One. WMOR surrendered its license on April 11, 2017.
