= Home Bank and Trust Company =

- U.S. National Register of Historic Places
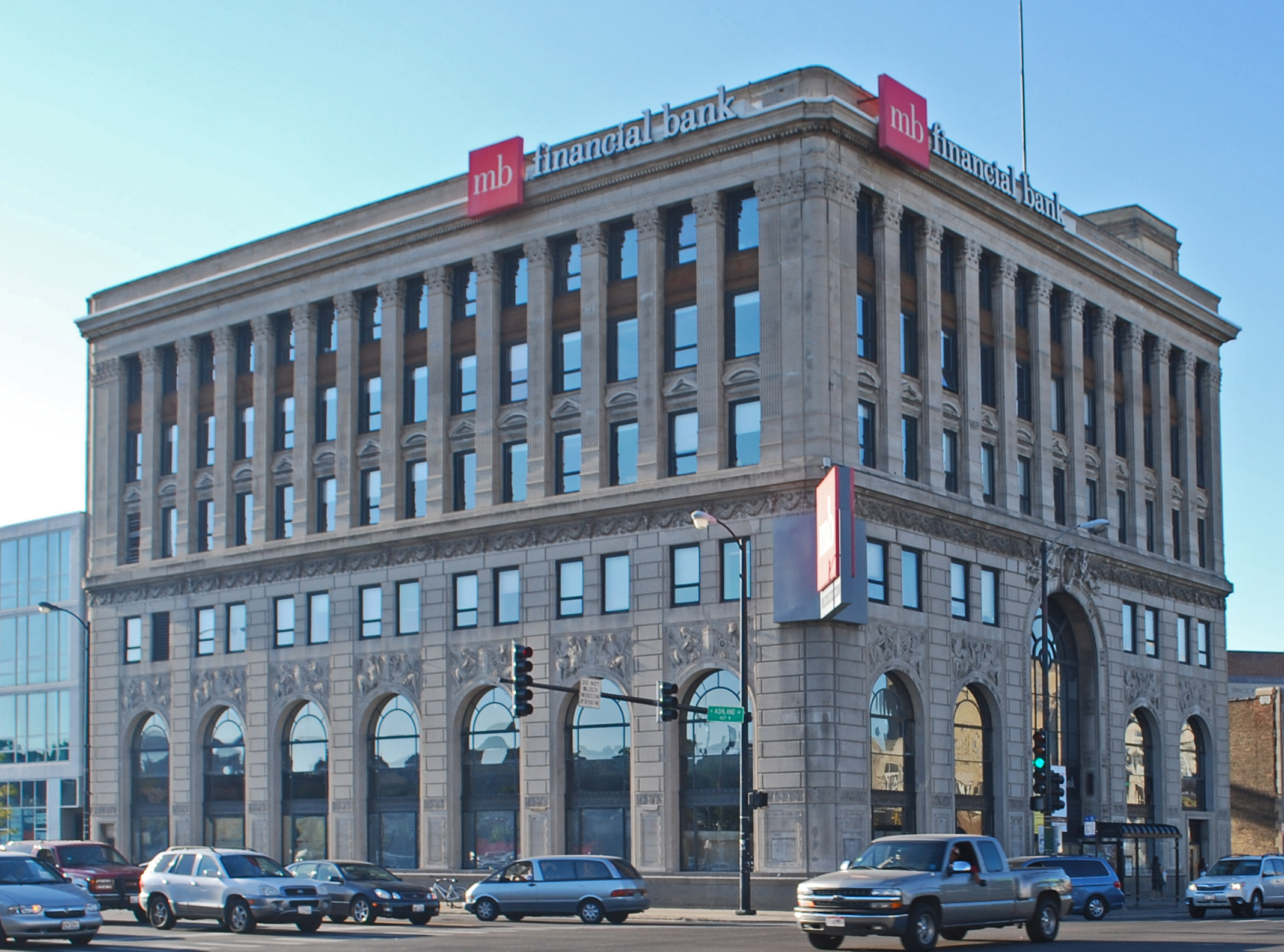

- Location within Chicago metropolitan area Location within Illinois Location within the United States
- Location: 1200 N. Ashland Ave., Chicago, Illinois
- Coordinates: 41°54′14″N 87°40′05″W
- Area: less than one acre
- Built: 1926
- Architect: Karl M. Vitzthum
- Architectural style: Renaissance Revival
- NRHP reference No.: 07000061
- Added to NRHP: February 21, 2007

The Home Bank and Trust Company is a historic bank building at 1200 N. Ashland Avenue in the Wicker Park neighborhood of Chicago, Illinois. The bank was organized in 1911 to serve the surrounding neighborhood, which was expanding as transportation to downtown Chicago improved. It became an institution for the neighborhood's Polish American community, both by providing it with financial services and by having many Polish employees and directors. The bank's 1926 Renaissance Revival building was designed by Karl M. Vitzthum. Vitzthum was a Chicago architect known for designing both banks and skyscrapers. The six-story building's design includes a three-story arched entrance flanked by two-story arched windows, limestone carvings, pilasters on the upper three stories, and a cornice and frieze along its roof. The Home Bank and Trust Company merged into the Manufacturers National Bank of Chicago in 1948, but its building still serves as a bank.

The building was added to the National Register of Historic Places on February 21, 2007.
