= All American Bank Building =

- U.S. National Register of Historic Places
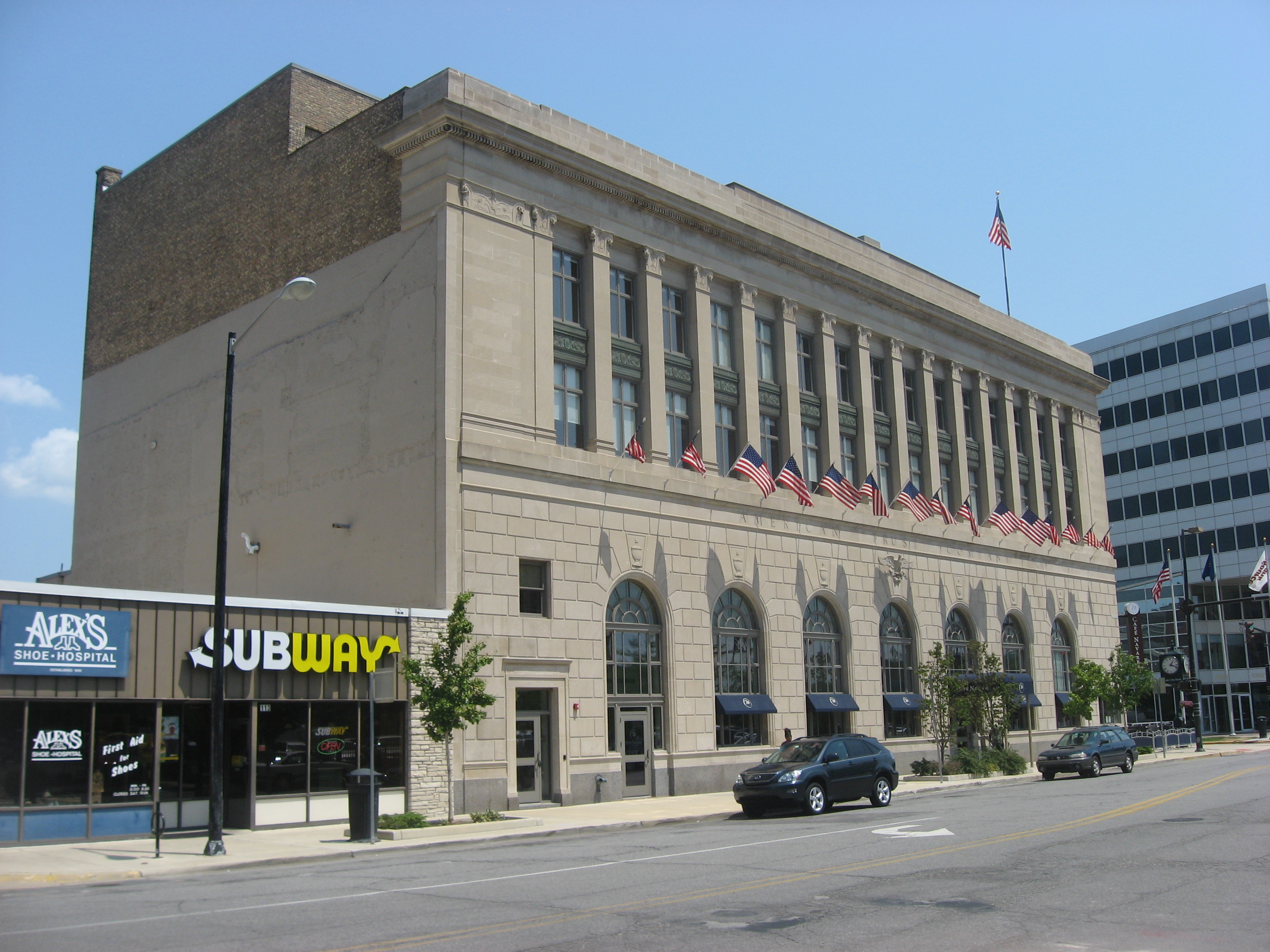
- All American Bank Building, July 2012

- Location within Indiana Location within the United States
- Location: 111 W. Washington, South Bend, Indiana
- Coordinates: 41°40′36″N 86°15′2″W
- Area: less than one acre
- Built: 1924
- Architect: Vitzthum & Burns
- Architectural style: Classical Revival
- MPS: Downtown South Bend Historic MRA
- NRHP reference No.: 85001202
- Added to NRHP: June 5, 1985

All American Bank Building is a historic bank building located at South Bend, Indiana. It was built in 1924, and is a four-story, Classical Revival style Indiana limestone building. It was designed by Chicago architects Vitzthum & Burns. The first floor has large round-arched openings, above which are Corinthian order pilasters that separate a continuous series of windows. The All American Bank occupied the building until 1970.

It was listed on the National Register of Historic Places in 1985.
