= State Bank of Hammond Building =

- U.S. National Register of Historic Places
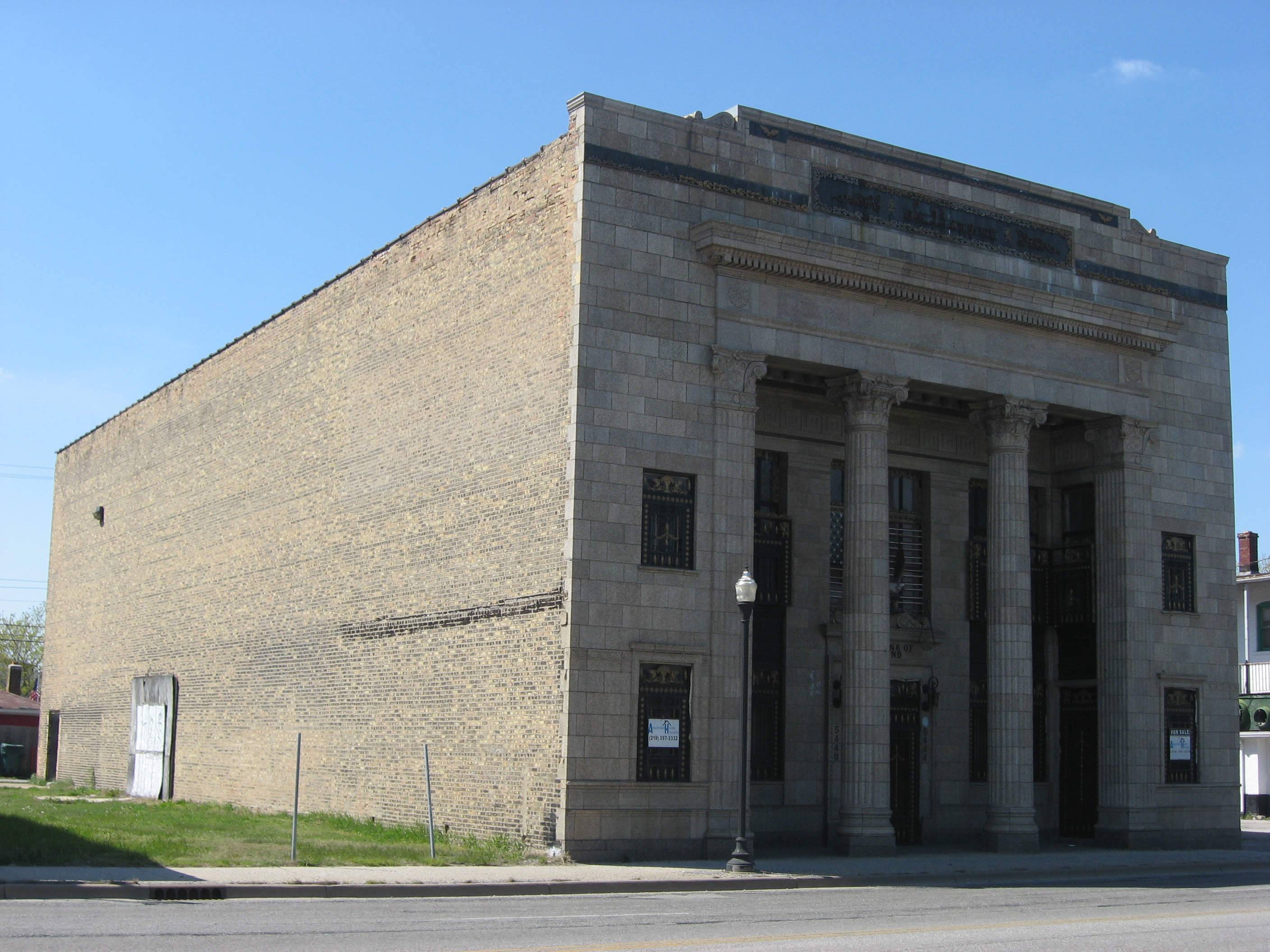
- State Bank of Hammond Building, April 2012

- Location within Indiana Location within the United States
- Location: 5444-5446 Calumet Ave., Hammond, Indiana
- Coordinates: 41°36′52″N 87°30′33″W
- Area: less than one acre
- Built: 1927
- Architect: Vitzthum & Burns
- Architectural style: Classical Revival
- NRHP reference No.: 84001072
- Added to NRHP: September 27, 1984

State Bank of Hammond Building is a historic bank building located at 5444-5446 Calumet Avenue in Hammond, Indiana. It was built in 1927, and was designed by Chicago architects Vitzthum & Burns. It is a two-story, Classical Revival style brick, concrete, and steel building on a full basement. The front facade is faced in terra cotta and features a colossal entry portico with two engaged square columns and two fluted round columns. The Northern States Life Insurance Company ceased operation in 1931, and the building subsequently housed the Calumet State Bank from 1933 until 1935, and later a license bureau and other retail and office uses.

It was listed in the National Register of Historic Places in 1984.

== See also ==
- National Register of Historic Places listings in Lake County, Indiana
