= Old Republic Building =

Coordinates: 41°53′14″N 87°37′27″W

The Old Republic Building, at 307 North Michigan Avenue in Chicago, Illinois, was built in 1924. It was designed by architects Vitzthum & Burns.

It was listed as a Chicago Landmark in 2010.

It was known as the Bell Building until 1956.

It was the first high-rise building in its area.
