= 120 North LaSalle =

Office skyscraper in Chicago, Illinois

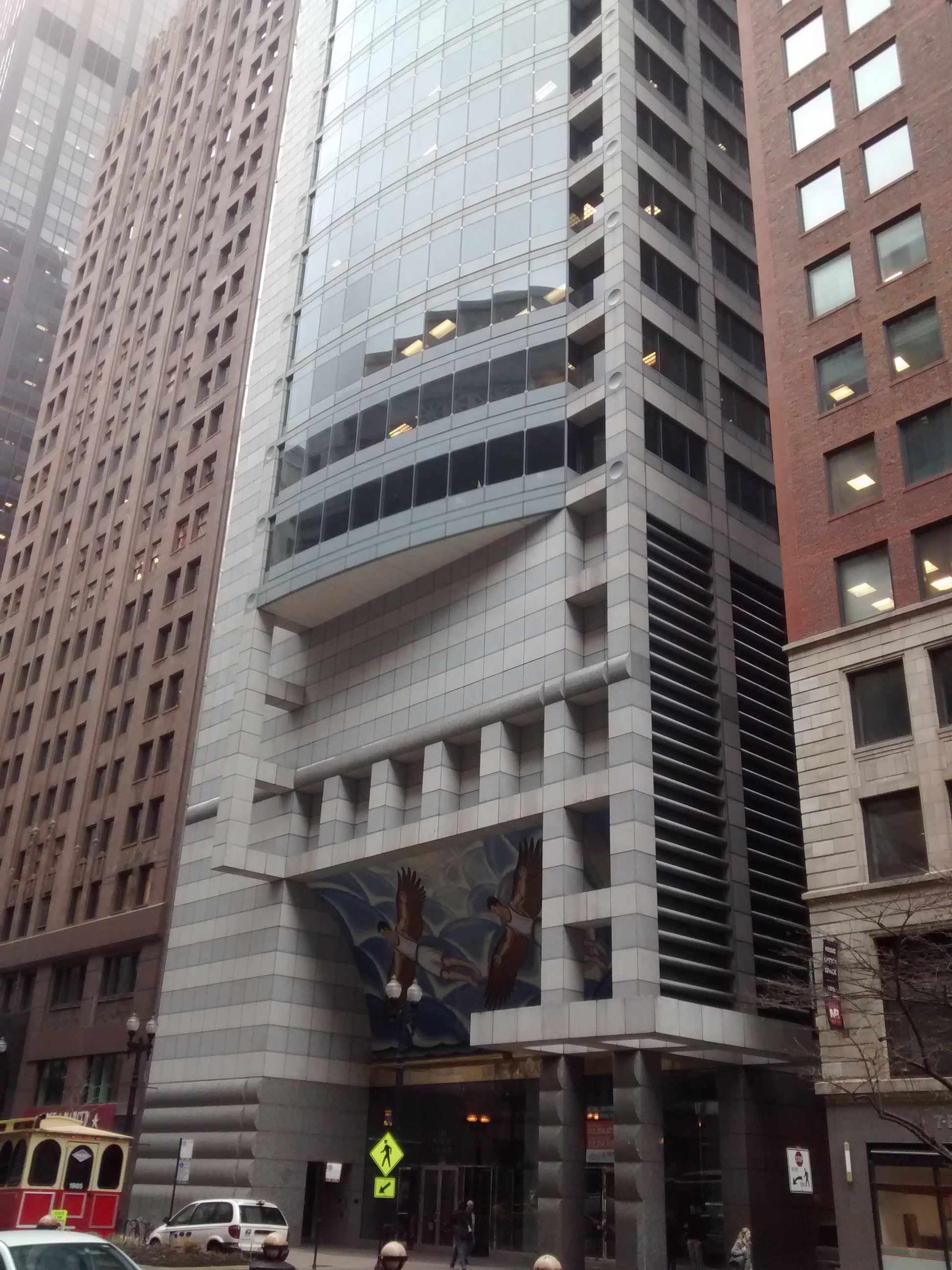
- Interactive map of the 120 North LaSalle area

General information
- Type: Office
- Location: 120 North LaSalle Street; Chicago, Illinois
- Coordinates: 41.8837°N 87.6328°W
- Construction started: 1989
- Completed: 1992

Height
- Roof: 501 ft (153 m)

Technical details
- Floor count: 39

Design and construction
- Architect: Murphy/Jahn Architects
- 120 North LaSalle
- U.S. Historic district – Contributing property
- Part of: West Loop–LaSalle Street Historic District (ID12001238)
- Designated CP: June 1, 2013

120 North LaSalle is a 501 ft (153 m) high-rise office building in Chicago, Illinois. It was constructed from 1989 to 1992. It is the 89th tallest building in the city.

The building is LEED Gold-certified under the LEED EB&OM (Existing Buildings & Operations and Maintenance) program.

Above the main entrance is a mosaic mural, by artist Roger Brown, depicting Daedalus and Icarus. It was commissioned by the architects and Ahmanson Commercial Development Company in 1991.

== See also ==
- List of tallest buildings in Chicago
