= WMOR (Chicago) =

Radio station in Chicago (1949–1952)

- Chicago, Illinois; United States
- Broadcast area: Chicago metropolitan area
- Frequency: 102.7 MHz

Ownership
- Owner: Metropolitan Radio Corporation of Chicago

History
- First air date: March 20, 1949
- Last air date: January 1952

Technical information
- Class: B
- ERP: 40,000 watts

WMOR (102.7 MHz) was an FM radio station in Chicago which broadcast from 1949 to January 1952. It was owned by the Metropolitan Radio Corporation of Chicago and had its studios and transmitter at 188 W. Randolph Street. It struggled financially and was wracked by management turnover throughout its history.

== History ==
The Metropolitan Radio Corporation of Chicago, a group of 46 shareholders with the largest share held by restaurateur Dario Toffenetti, received a construction permit from the Federal Communications Commission (FCC) to build a new class B FM radio station in Chicago at the start of September 1948. Among the owners in Metropolitan were ten veterans of World War II from Chicago's South Side. The station set up at Chicago's Steuben Building at 188 W. Randolph Street, where the transmitter was on the building's 32nd floor and a 90-foot (27 m) antenna and tower was mounted to the top.

WMOR began broadcasting on March 20, 1949. It programmed a variety of fine music, including opera, symphony, jazz and folk, as well as plays and musical programs from the BBC. It also had news and public service programs, which were not emphasized by Chicago's other FM outlets. An article in The Billboard magazine noted that WMOR was an experiment to see if an FM station heavy on live programming could achieve the same status as an AM station. Shortly after going on, WMOR contracted with Consumers' Aid for storecasting, the use of its signal to feed receivers in stores, to more than 150 Jewel and independent grocery stores.

Despite, per Variety, being "generally considered Chi's most successful commercial FM operation", WMOR struggled through a tough FM marketplace, and the station lost $20,000 in six months. Original company president Ralph J. Wood resigned in October 1949 after his plans to curtail operation to storecasting and a minimal service of evening music, while reducing staff, were rejected by the board. Late that year, the station aired a documentary that featured an interview with Black victims of the Peoria Street race riot in Englewood. A tape recording and records were made of the interview. Toffenetti—the recently elected chairman of the board—evidently enraged by its contents, called the studio and demanded the program be taken off the air. He was ignored in that demand and in another to destroy all transcriptions of the program. He then traveled to the studio and smashed 300 or 100 records of the program. A column by John T. McManus in the left-wing National Guardian connected the race riots with "known persons connected with a realty owners' 'betterment' organization, which maintains block captains to give the signal when any incident threatens its lilywhite standards". In spite of Toffenetti's destroying the records, a tape of the interview was reported to have survived.

Toffenetti resigned from the board in February 1950 after the board of directors stripped him of his authority over station affairs, charging him with "interference and censorship". His cutting ties cost the station a third of its revenue in advertising accounts he influenced, including programs he personally sponsored. Variety noted that the corporation had just authorized the issuance of new stock and that "the Toffenetti incident is expected to seriously impair sales of this latest issue". After the conflict, the entire board of directors of Metropolitan resigned, with a new board including Toffenetti elected. Toffenetti's return brought back 20% of the station's revenue. The next month, Consumers' Aid announced its plans to switch its service to another FM station, WEAW, in 1951. At the time, storecasting was operating on WMOR for 10 hours a day, 6 days a week.

In December 1951, Abraham Teitelbaum, a Chicago attorney identified as a former attorney for Al Capone, became the principal investor in WMOR. The station was taken off the air in late January 1952. Minority stockholders in the firm questioned the legality of Teitelbaum taking the station silent. In April, a receiver was appointed for the Metropolitan Radio Corporation of Chicago, which was said to owe back rent and have several active claims against it. The station's license was canceled the following August.
