= St. Peter's in the Loop =

Church in Chicago, Illinois, US

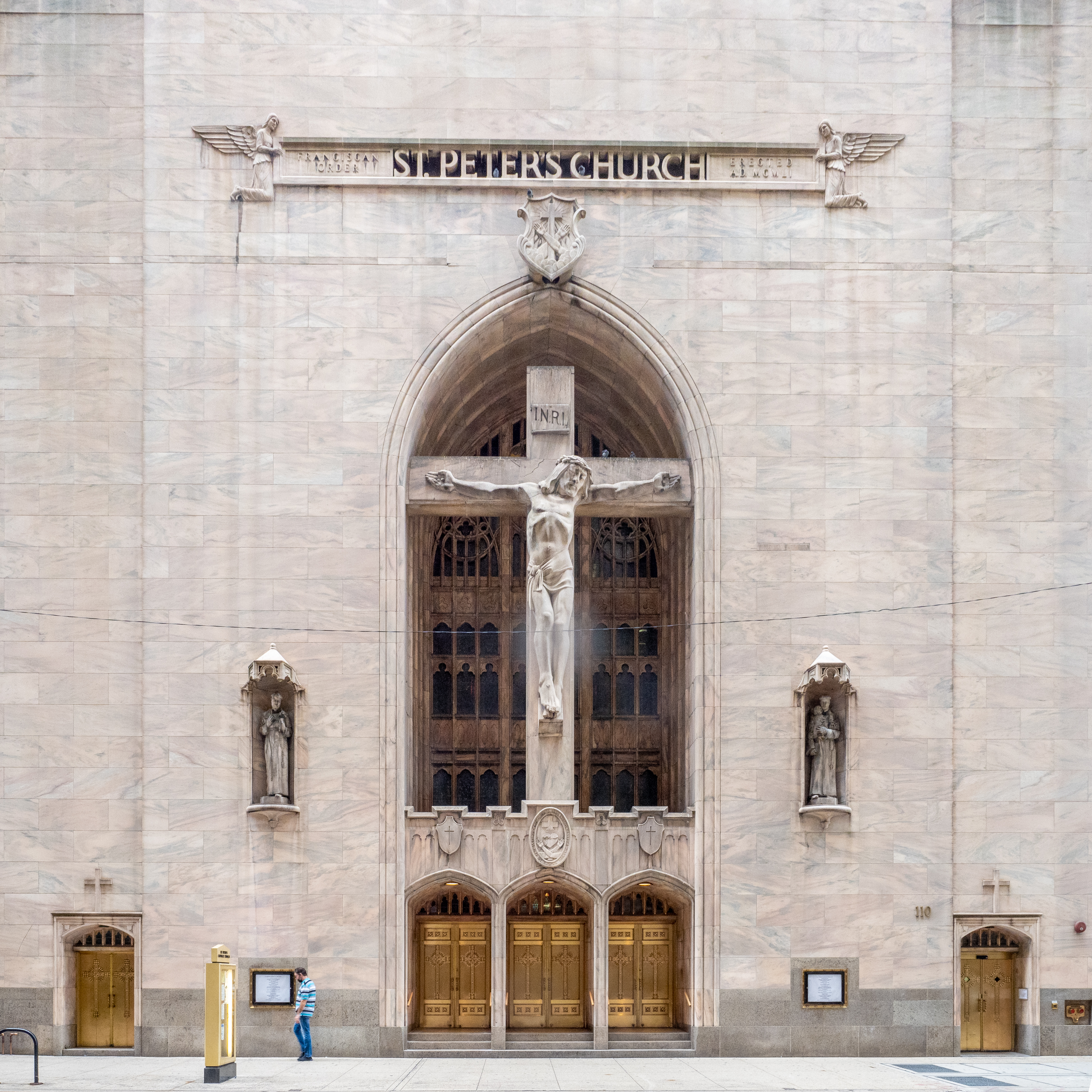
- Church façade as seen from Madison Street, 2021

General information
- Location: Chicago Loop, 110 W. Madison St, Chicago, IL 60602
- Coordinates: 41°52′56.6″N 87°37′53.1″W
- Opened: 1953; 73 years ago

Design and construction
- Architect: Vitzthum & Burns

Website
- www.stpetersloop.org

St. Peter's in the Loop, on Madison between LaSalle and Clark in Chicago, Illinois, was built in 1953. It was designed by architects Vitzthum & Burns.

The St. Peter's church was founded in 1846. Its second building was constructed in 1865. Franciscan friars took over the parish in 1875.

The current building's front facade features a crucifix titled "Christ of the Loop", designed by Latvian sculptor Arvid Strauss, executed by Chicago artist J. Watts. It is 18 feet (5.5 m) tall.
