= Karl M. Vitzthum =

German-born American architect (1880–1967)

- Born: 1880; Tutzing
- Died: 1967 (aged 86–87)
- Occupation: Architect

Karl Martin Vitzthum (1880–1967) was an American architect.

He was born in Tutzing, near Munich, in Germany and attended Munich's Royal School of Architecture (Technical University of Munich or Ludwig-Maximilians-Universität München (LMU)?). He came to the U.S. in 1902 and to Chicago in 1914. He worked at Burnham & Co., at that firm's successor Graham, Anderson, Probst & White, and at Jarvis Hunt. He also worked with Fredrick J. Teich before partnering with John J. Burns (1886-1956) in 1919 in firm Karl M. Vitzthum & Co. Burns was the junior partner. At some point Vitzthum & Burns became the firm name. After Burns died the firm became Vitzthum & Kill, and specialized in churches, schools, high-rise residential, and penal institutions.

He designed more than 50 bank buildings.

He self-reportedly proposed that Comiskey Park be built with cantilevering, avoiding use of posts and allowing unobstructed views, but Comiskey balked at the extra cost.

He served on the Chicago Zoning Board of Appeals from 1958 until his death in 1967.

Several of his works are listed on the National Register of Historic Places (NRHP).

== Works ==
Works by Vitzthum or the firms include:

- All American Bank Building (1924), South Bend, Indiana, (Vitzthum & Burns), NRHP-listed
- Old Republic Building (1925), Chicago (Vitzthum & Burns)
- Lerner Theatre (1924), 410 S. Main st., Elkhart, Indiana
- Home Bank and Trust Company (1926), 1200 N. Ashland Ave., Chicago, NRHP-listed
- Granada Theater (1927) South Bend, Indiana
- State Bank of Hammond Building (1927), 5444-5446 Calumet Ave., Hammond, Indiana, NRHP-listed
- Steuben Club Building (1929), later known as Randolph Tower, 188 West Randolph Street, Chicago (K.M. Vitzthum & Co.), NRHP-listed
- One LaSalle Street Building (1930 or 1939?), also known as One North LaSalle Building, at 1 N LaSalle St., Chicago, (Vitzthum & Burns), NRHP-listed
- Sheboygan County Courthouse (1933–34), 615 N. 6th St., Sheboygan, Wisconsin, (with W.C. Weeks, of Sheboygan), NRHP-listed
- St. Peter's in the Loop (1953), (Vitzthum & Burns)
