= Randolph Tower =

Building in Chicago, Illinois, US

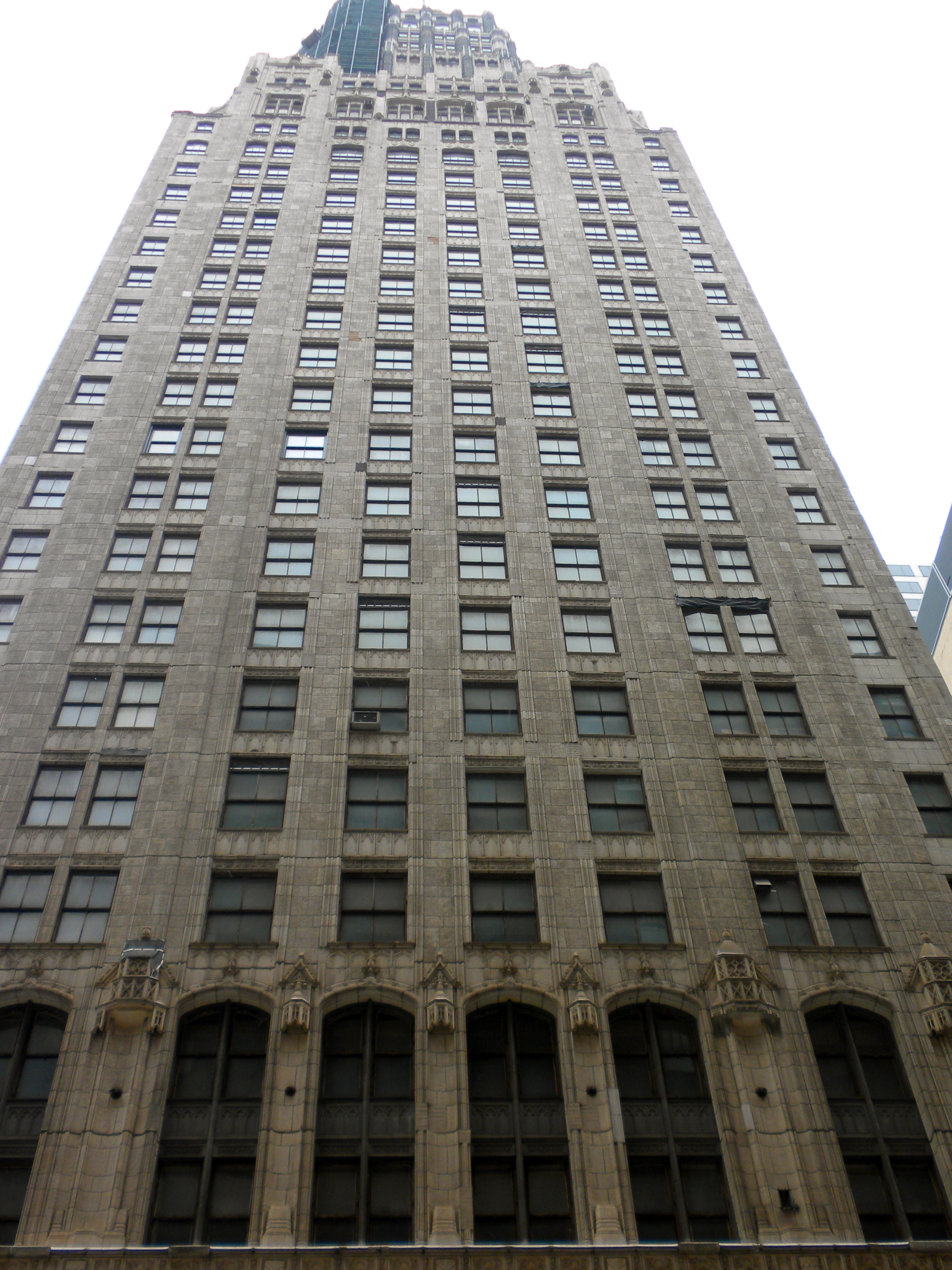
- Interactive map of the Randolph Tower area
- Former names: Steuben Club Building

General information
- Architectural style: Gothic Revival
- Location: 188 W. Randolph St, Chicago, Illinois, United States
- Opened: 1929

Height
- Height: 463 feet (141 m)

Technical details
- Floor count: 45

Design and construction
- Architect: Karl M. Vitzthum

- Steuben Club, The
- U.S. National Register of Historic Places
- Location within Chicago metropolitan area Location within Illinois Location within the United States
- Location: 188 W. Randolph St., Chicago, Illinois
- Coordinates: 41°53′4″N 87°38′1″W
- Area: 0.3 acres (0.12 ha)
- Built: 1929
- Architect: Vitzhum, K.M. & Co.
- Architectural style: Gothic Revival
- NRHP reference No.: 07000457
- Added to NRHP: May 22, 2007

Randolph Tower, formerly known as the Steuben Club Building, is a historic Gothic Revival skyscraper in Downtown Chicago, Illinois. The building was constructed in 1929 and designed by architect Karl M. Vitzthum, who designed another Chicago landmark, the historic One North LaSalle Building.

Randolph Tower was built for the Steuben Club of Chicago to promote German-American heritage. After the first World War, American citizens of German descent sought to found clubs to serve as a testimonial of their loyalty to the ideals of American citizenship. The first 25 floors were built for retail and offices and the club was located at the top floors. Several of the tenants were also club members.

Randolph Tower is recognizable for its terra-cotta clad exterior and was depicted in the 2009 film Public Enemies as a hangout for the main character, John Dillinger, who dated one of the coat-check girls. The city of Chicago designated the structure a landmark on July 26, 2006. On May 22, 2007, the building was officially listed on the National Register of Historic Places listings in Central Chicago. Randolph Tower was added to the National Register of Historic Places on May 22, 2007. In 2011, the building began receiving an exterior renovation and remodeling of the interior by Randolph Tower Development Company. It is now used as an apartment building with 312 apartments. The renovation was completed in 2012.
