= WMOR-FM =

- Morehead, Kentucky; United States
- Frequency: 106.1 MHz (HD Radio)
- Branding: Mix 106

Programming
- Format: Adult hits

Ownership
- Owner: Morgan County Industries, Inc.
- Sister stations: WLKS-FM; WCBJ; WRLV-FM

History
- First air date: 1965
- Former call signs: WMOR-FM (1965–2000); WQXX (2000–2012)

Technical information
- Licensing authority: FCC
- Facility ID: 73279
- Class: C3
- ERP: 19,500 watts
- HAAT: 114 meters (374 ft)
- Transmitter coordinates: 38°10′56″N 83°26′56″W

Links
- Public license information: Public file; LMS

WMOR-FM (106.1 FM) is a radio station broadcasting an adult hits format. The station is licensed to Morehead, Kentucky, United States. It is owned by Morgan County Industries, Inc.
