= Roanoke Building =

Office skyscraper in Chicago, Illinois

- Lumber Exchange Building and Tower Addition
- U.S. National Register of Historic Places
- Chicago Landmark
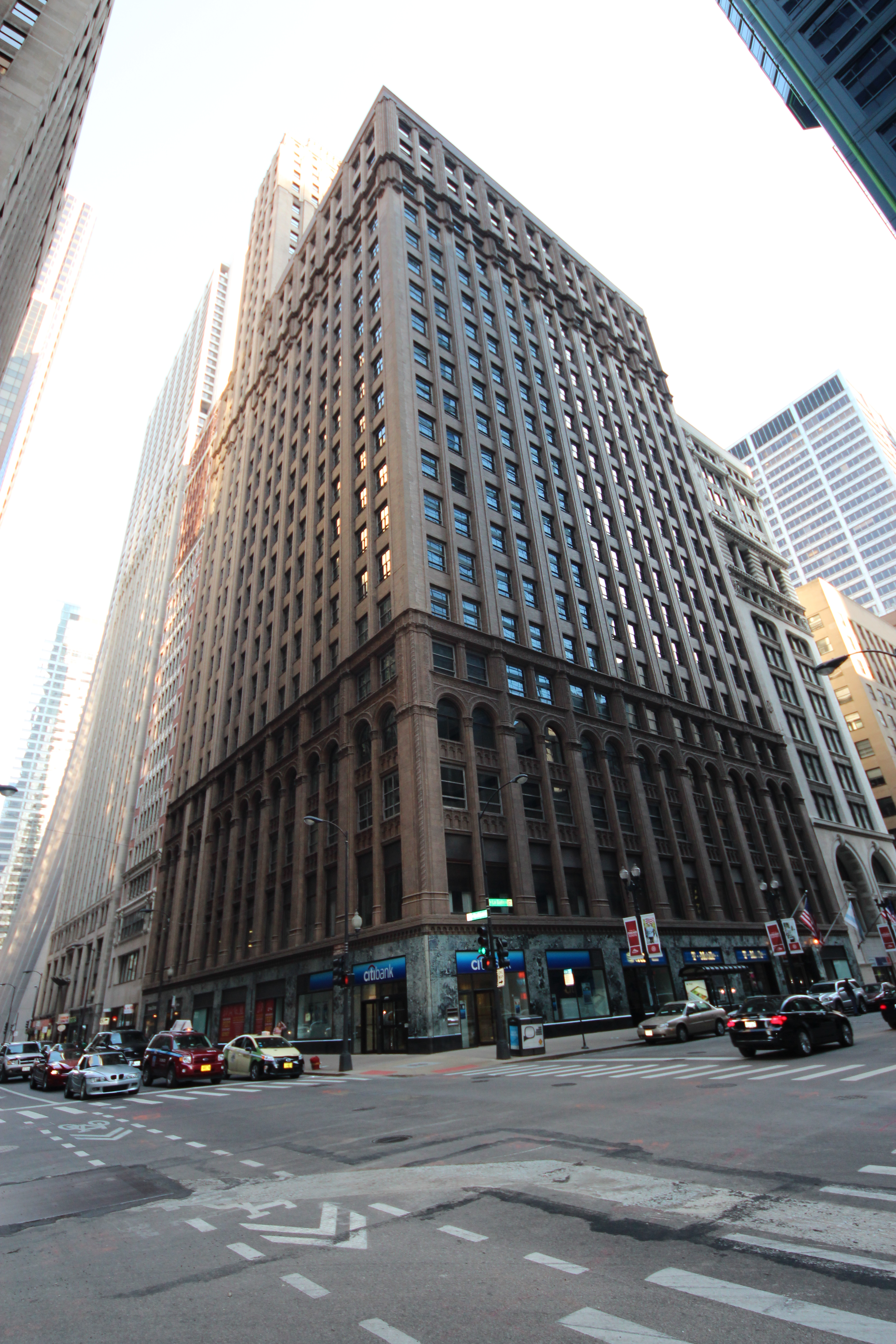
- Roanoke Building from west along Madison

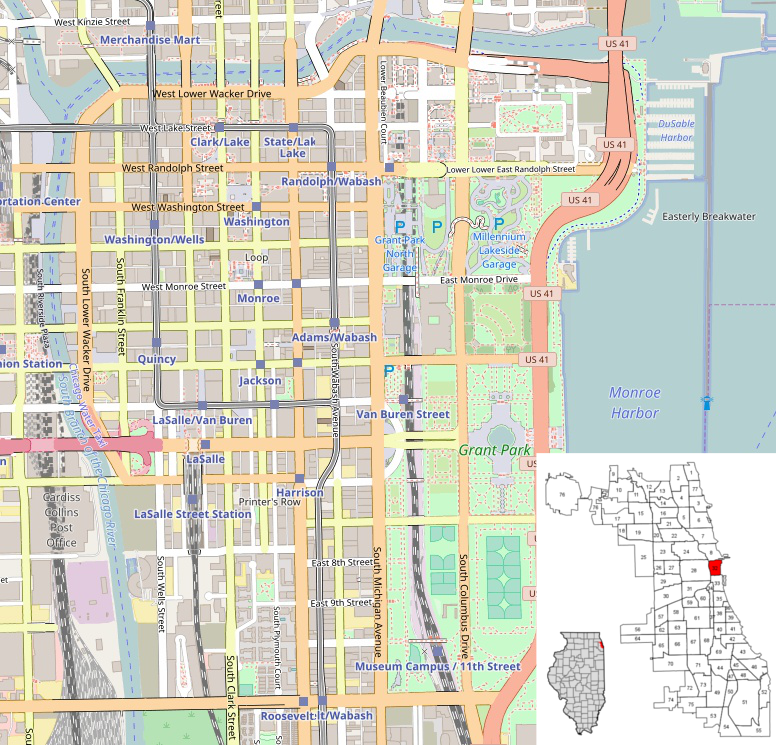
- Location within Chicago Loop
- Location: 11 South LaSalle Street; Chicago, Illinois
- Coordinates: 41°52′53.7″N 87°37′56.4″W
- Area: less than one acre
- Built: 1915
- Architect: Holabird & Roche
- Architectural style: Portuguese Gothic Revival
- NRHP reference No.: 07001238

Significant dates
- Added to NRHP: December 6, 2007
- Designated CHICL: December 12, 2007

11 South LaSalle Street Building or Eleven South LaSalle Street Building (formerly Roanoke Building and Tower and originally Lumber Exchange Building and Tower Addition or simply the Roanoke Building and Lumber Exchange Building) is a Chicago Landmark building that is listed on the National Register of Historic Places and that is located at 11 South LaSalle Street in the Loop community area of Chicago, Illinois, United States. This address is located on the southeast corner of LaSalle and Madison Street in Cook County, Illinois, across the Madison Street from the One North LaSalle Building. The building sits on a site of a former Roanoke building (once known as Major Block 2) that once served as a National Weather Service Weather Forecast official climate site and replaced Major Block 1 after the Great Chicago Fire. The current building has incorporated the frontage of other buildings east of the original site of Major Block 1.

The building was listed on the National Register of Historic Places (under the name Lumber Exchange Building and Tower Addition) on December 6, 2007, and named a Chicago Landmark on December 12, 2007. It incorporates the lands of the former DeSoto Building and former Farwell Hall. The building was renovated to become the world's largest Residence Inn in 2015.

== Original Roanoke Building ==
A four-story Major Block 1 building, designed by T. V. Widskier, sat on this location until the Great Chicago Fire. After the fire, this was replaced with the Major Block 2, which eventually became known as the Roanoke Building. Major Block 2 stood from 1872 to 1912 as a seven-story building on spread foundations. It was designed by Dixon & Hamilton and had a length of 136 feet (41.5 m) along South LaSalle Street and a width of 66 feet (20.1 m) along West Madison Street. A commonly published illustration of this building shows it as a five-story building. From June 8, 1873, to January 1, 1887, the original Roanoke building served as the Chicago location for the National Weather Service Weather Forecast official climate site. The building is mentioned in Saul Bellow's More Die of Heartbreak but there it is referred to as a wealthy residence building and not as an office building.

== Current Roanoke Building ==
=== The original current building ===
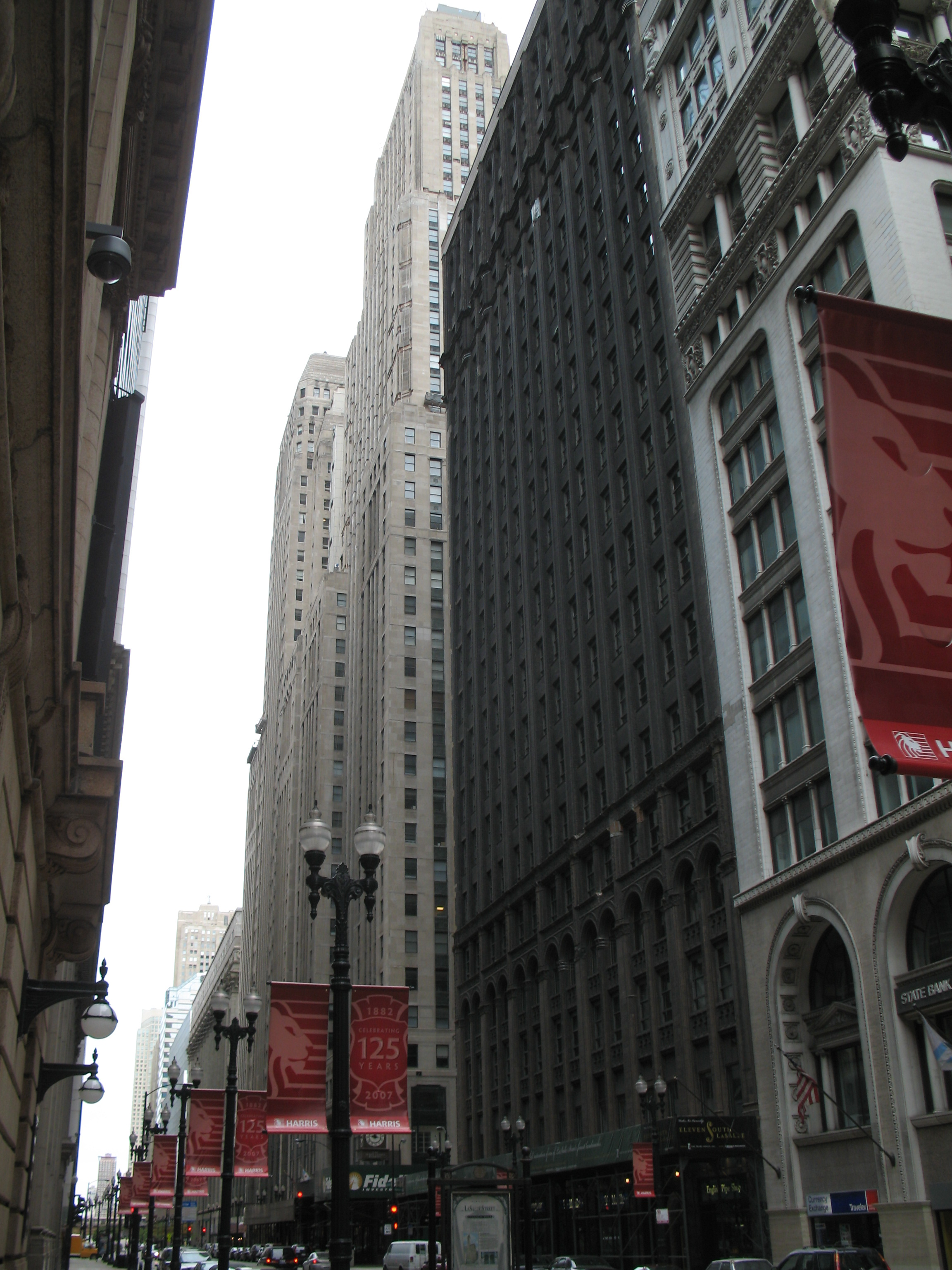
Roanoke Building (dark) in front of One North LaSalle (light grey) on right from South on LaSalle Street

The current building was designed in three phases: in 1915 Holabird & Roche's design for the first 16 floors was built, and five floors were added in 1922. It was built originally as the sixteen-story high Lumber Exchange Building and later renamed as the 11 South LaSalle Street Building. The Holabird & Roche design had three basements and rock caissons. The original 16-floor building was a late Chicago school commercial building that incorporated arches at both the fourth and the top floor, but when the top five floors were added in 1922 under the original cornice, the top rank of arches disappeared. The building uses dark terra cotta with italianate designs. The vaulted ceiling and marble wall lobby contribute to what is described as a classical entrance and lobby. The Palladian entrance uses contrasting variegated white and black marble.

=== Tower addition ===
In 1925, the building was built to its current 35 story height by the addition of an adjacent tower to the east of the Madison street frontage. The entire building contains 330,000 square feet (31,000 m^{2}). The 36-story tower was added east of the original structure on the site of the former DeSoto Building at 125-129 West Madison. The tower was an early example of the use of setbacks and it uses ranks of paired windows. When the Tower was built, four bronze bells were cast by the Meneely Bell Company (the second Meneely Bell Foundry) and installed as a clock-chime. They were set to chime an original composition called "Samheim", which is Norse for "Tomorrow", every quarter-hour. The largest of these bells weighs 7,201 pounds (3,266 kg; 514.4 st) and is inscribed with the name "Leander" in honor of Leander McCormick. The current Roanoke building is the city's only example of a building in the style of Portuguese Gothic architecture. According to the press release from the city announcing the landmark promotion, the building's terra cotta ornamentation is derived from Portuguese Gothic precedents. The building was modernized in the 1950s and went through a postmodern renovation in 1984 to evoke the original ornamentation. The building has the same frontage as the original Roanoke building plus that of the former Farewell Hall (built by William W. Boyington at 131-3 West Madison Street).

From 1920 until 1969 the building hosted the offices of the law firm Sidley & Austin. Today the building is leased by small service industry firms, such as second-floor tenant Thomas P. Gohagan & Co., which arranges travel trips and tours for non-profit organizations.

The building is undergoing renovation to the lobby, the façade, the elevators and the exterior lighting. The recent National Register listing has made the renovation feasible by making the building eligible for federal tax credits and reduced property taxes. The building qualified for the landmark Class L tax status, which makes it eligible for twelve years of reduced property taxes and other economic incentives for repair and rehab of historic buildings In order to perform the renovation the owners took out a $43.3 million loan against the property according to Form 8-K filings with the U.S. Securities and Exchange Commission. Its National Registered Historic Places announcement listed it under the name "Lumber Exchange Building and Tower Addition" although its Chicago Landmark listing is under the name "Roanoke Building and Tower."

=== 2015 Remodel ===
In October 2006, Michael Reschke bought the Roanoke building and he refinanced it in 2007. In 2009, Reschke announced plans to convert the building into a high-end hotel. In April 2012, Michael Silberberg-led Berkley Properties LLC appeared to have bought the Roanoke Building from KBS Capital Advisors LLC with plans to convert the building into a hotel. However, financing difficulties caused the plans to be caught up in legal proceedings within a month. By January 2014, Reschke had prevailed in a legal battle and secured financing for a $68 million construction loan to convert the building into a Residence Inn. In late 2014, the city approved a $13.8 million, 12-year property tax incentive for rehabilitating historic elements of the building, adding a green roof, and converting the building to a Residence Inn. On September 21, 2015, the building opened for business as the largest Residence Inn in the world with 380 rooms and 7500 square feet of meeting space after $136 million in renovations over two years. On November 10, 2015, Residence Inn celebrated its 40th anniversary during the 100th year of the building's existence at this location, which was its 700th location.
