= One North LaSalle =

Office building in Chicago, Illinois

- One LaSalle Street Building
- U.S. National Register of Historic Places
- Chicago Landmark
- Location within Chicago metropolitan area Location within Illinois Location within the United States
- Location: 1 N. LaSalle Street; Chicago, Illinois
- Coordinates: 41°52′55.37″N 87°37′55.68″W
- Built: 1930
- Architects: Vitzthum, Karl Martin; Burns, John J.
- Architectural style: Skyscraper, Art Deco
- NRHP reference No.: 99001378

Significant dates
- Added to NRHP: November 22, 1999
- Designated CHICL: April 16, 1996

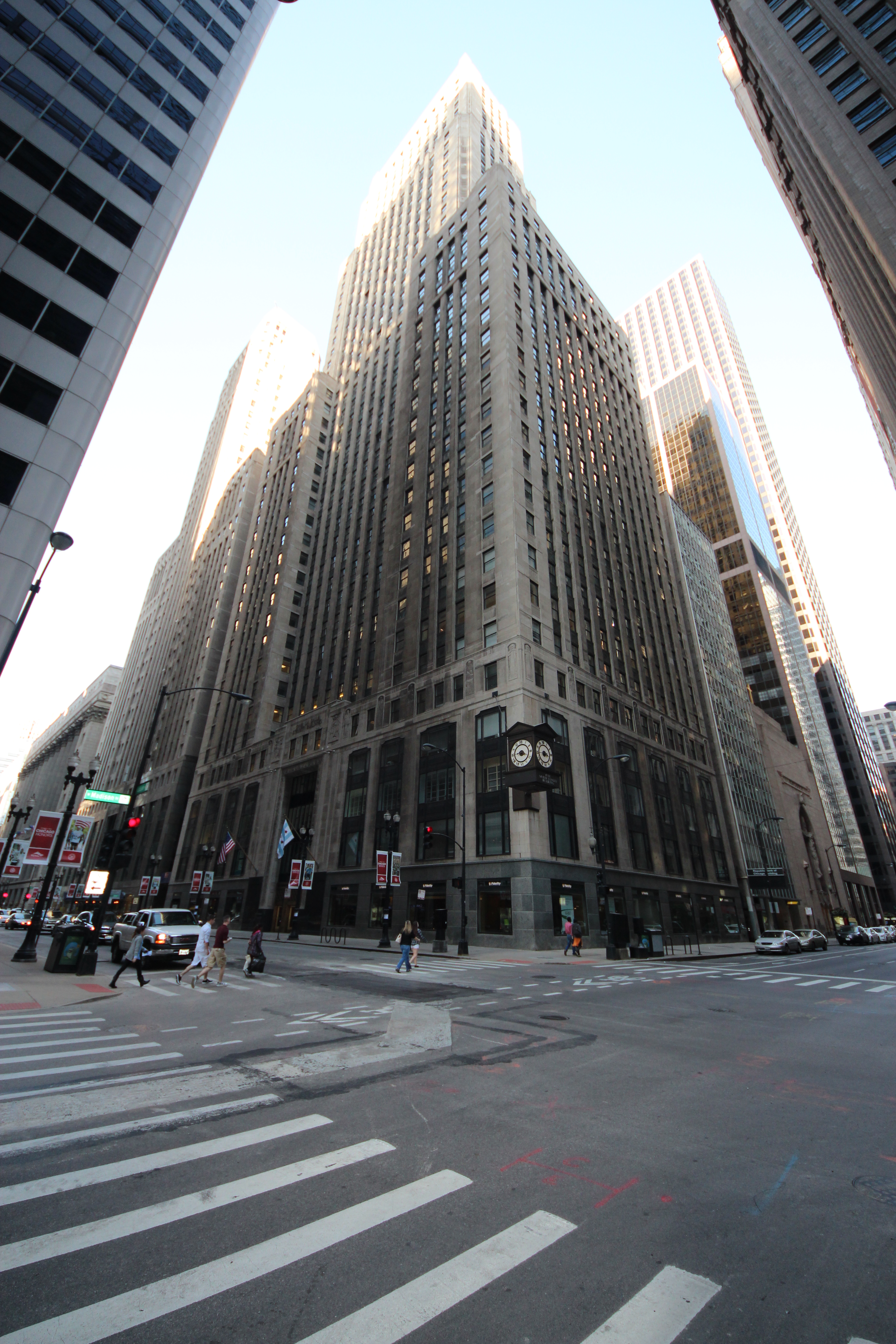
Northeastward view of One North LaSalle Building, the light grey building just beyond the Roanoke Building, from LaSalle Street.

The One North LaSalle Building or One LaSalle Street Building is a building in the LaSalle Street corridor in the Loop community area of Chicago managed by One North Realty LLC. It was for some time one of Chicago's tallest buildings. Built in 1930 by architects Vitzthum & Burns, it replaces the Tacoma Building by Holabird & Roche. The building is located across Madison Street from Roanoke Building.

One North LaSalle was designated a Chicago Landmark on April 16, 1996, and added to the National Register of Historic Places on November 22, 1999. Its 5th floor relief panels depict the explorations of René-Robert Cavelier, Sieur de La Salle.

== Height and Ranking ==
The Chicago Board of Trade Building was the tallest building in Chicago for some 35 years by conventional definitions. At 530 feet (160 m) and 48 stories, One North LaSalle was the fourth tallest building (fifth tallest after the completion of the LaSalle National Bank Building) structure for approximately the same period. Other sources, however, claim this building was the tallest structure for approximately the same period defined by excluding items on top of the main building such as the Board of Trade Building's statue and pyramidal top, the steeple of the Chicago Temple Building, the pyramidal top of the Pittsfield Building, and the mansard roof of the Civic Opera House. The height differences are easily seen in scale depictions.
