= Universal's Endless Summer Resort =

Resort located at Universal Orlando in Orlando, Florida

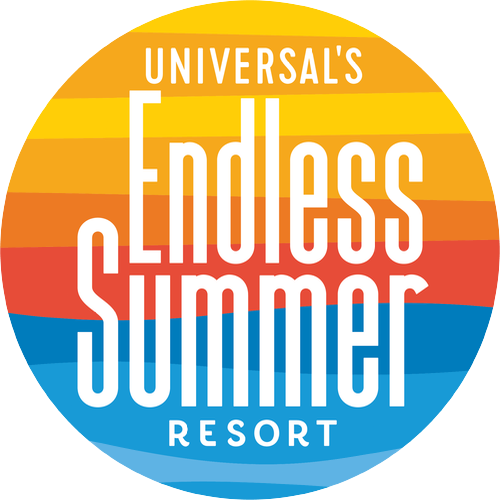

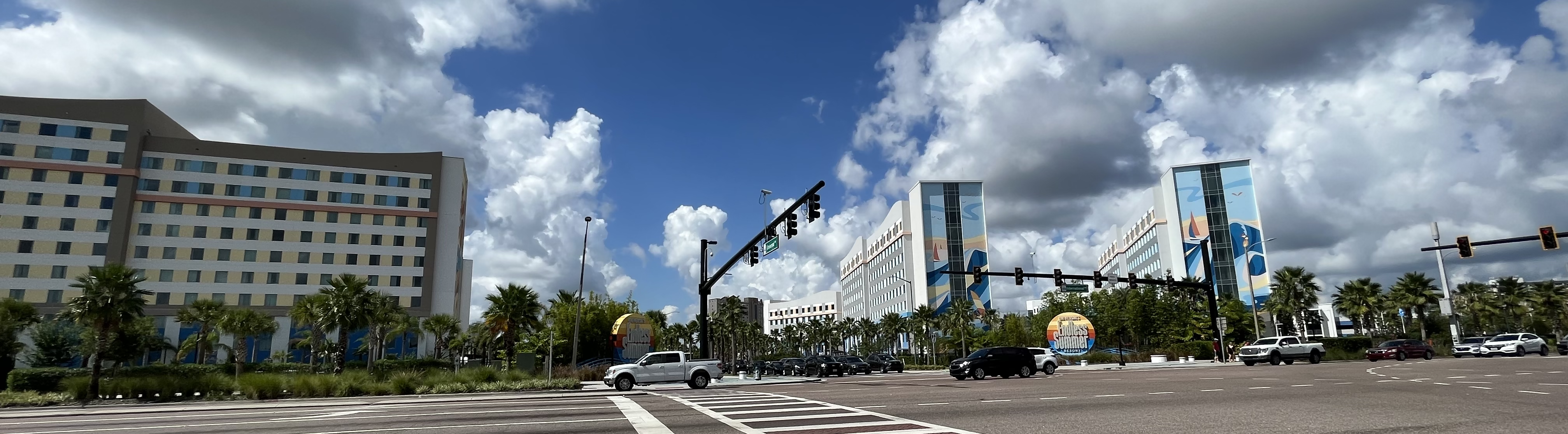
- Universal's Endless Summer Resort (L to R): Dockside Inn and Suites, Surfside Inn and Suites

General information
- Location: Universal Orlando Resort; Orlando, Florida, U.S., 7000 Universal Boulevard
- Coordinates: 28.4609°N 81.4640°W
- Opened: June 27, 2019 (Surfside Inn and Suites); December 15, 2020 (Dockside Inn and Suites)
- Owner: Loews Hotels & Co.; Universal Destinations & Experiences
- Operator: Loews Hotels; Universal Orlando

Other information
- Number of rooms: 750 (Surfside Inn and Suites); 2,050 (Dockside Inn and Suites)

Website
- Official website

Universal's Endless Summer Resort - Surfside Inn and Suites and Dockside Inn and Suites are a pair of hotels located in Universal Orlando in Orlando, Florida forming a single resort. The resorts are built on the former site of Wet 'n Wild Orlando, which had closed in 2016. The hotels were built as value-level hotels for Universal Orlando.

The resort has two themes, with the Surfside hotel being themed to a surfing lifestyle and the Dockside hotel being themed to a coastal retreat. Surfside Inn and Suites opened first on June 27, 2019, and Dockside Inn and Suites opened on December 15, 2020 following a delay due to the COVID-19 pandemic.

== History ==
After the permanent closure of Wet 'n Wild Orlando in 2016 due to focus on Volcano Bay, demolition for the property began in early 2017. On November 6, 2017, renderings for new unnamed hotel resorts were announced by Universal Orlando. Naming for the two hotels were revealed on April 5, 2018 as Universal's Endless Summer Resort, both designated as value hotels. Surfside Inn and Suites, which was built directly on the old Wet 'n Wild water park, was planned to open in summer of 2019 while Dockside Inn and Suites was expected to open in 2020.

By early 2019, Surfside Inn and Suites was preparing for opening while Dockside Inn and Suites was still under construction. On March 20, 2019, the grand opening for Surfside Inn and Suites was planned for June 27, 2019. The Surfside hotel officially opened on June 27, 2019. On November 12, 2019, the Dockside hotel was expected to open on March 17, 2020; this was delayed due to the COVID-19 pandemic. The Surfside hotel closed due to the pandemic as well, but had reopened in June 2020. Dockside Inn and Suites officially opened on December 15, 2020.

== Theme ==
The theme for Universal's Endless Summer Resort - Surfside Inn and Suites is a surfing lifestyle. The lobby features surfboards throughout the lobby, and in the resort's rooms, there is surf themed decor. The theme for Universal's Endless Summer Resort - Dockside Inn and suites is themed as a coastal retreat.

== Dining ==
Surfside Inn and Suites features one food court named Beach Break Cafe with one pool bar named the Sand Bar. Dockside Inn and Suites has a food court named Pier 8 Market with two pool bars, Wave Makers and The Oasis, along with a bar named Sunset Lounge. Both hotels include a Starbucks.
