= Wet 'n Wild (brand) =

Brand

- Type: Private
- Industry: Amusement park operator
- Founded: 1977; 49 years ago Orlando, Florida, U.S.
- Founder: George Millay
- Headquarters: Greensboro, North Carolina, U.S.
- Owner: Palace Entertainment

Wet ‘n Wild is a name used by various water parks operating in the United States, Brazil, and formerly Mexico; these parks were previously part of a water park chain owned by SeaWorld creator George Millay. This group of parks is not to be confused with the Wet'n'Wild brand owned by Village Roadshow Theme Parks and CNL Lifestyle Properties, or the stand-alone water park Wet N' Wild Waterworld in Anthony, Texas.

== History ==
The name was first used for a water park when SeaWorld founder George Millay opened his first water park Wet 'n Wild Orlando in Orlando, Florida in 1977. Wet 'n Wild in Orlando, however, closed permanently on December 31, 2016, and was replaced by Volcano Bay. Millay went on to open six more water parks under the same name in the United States, Brazil and Mexico. In 1997 and 1998, Millay sold the water parks to various owners, including Universal Destinations & Experiences, Palace Entertainment, and multiple private companies, for a total of $77 million.

== Locations ==
Locations of Wet 'n Wild parks
- Wet 'n Wild Emerald Pointe – operated by Lucky Strike Entertainment in Greensboro, North Carolina
- Wet 'n Wild São Paulo – a water park in Brazil. The $42 million park opened in October 1998, and spanned 29 acres (12 ha)

=== Previous locations ===
- Wet 'n Wild Orlando – operated by Universal Destinations & Experiences in Orlando, Florida, closed December 31, 2016. It has been replaced by the new Volcano Bay waterpark that opened in 2017.
- Arlington, Texas – rebranded as Six Flags Hurricane Harbor Arlington when purchased by Six Flags in 1997. Located across Interstate 30 from Six Flags Over Texas.
- Garland, Texas – formerly a Herschend Family Entertainment "White Water" park. The site is now occupied by a CarMax dealership.
- Wet 'n Wild Las Vegas, operated from 1985 to 2004 – demolished for planned developments, including NBA-ready arena, which never materialized and now vacant land; not to be confused with the present-day Wet'n'Wild Las Vegas.
- Salvador, Bahia – opened in 1996 as the first international park. It cost $28 million and spanned 18 acres (7.3 ha), however the park has gone bankrupt.
- Cancun, Mexico – opened in June 1997. At opening, the park spanned 17 acres (6.9 ha) It was part of the multi-park VenturaPark from 2017 until the indefinite closure of that complex on January 28, 2025.
- Rio de Janeiro, Brazil – opened in October 1999. Attracted over 300 thousand visitors in its first year but ended up closing in 2004 due to small financial gains.

=== Cancelled locations ===
- Brasília – $32 million, 42-acre (17 ha) originally targeted to open in late 1998, but during construction, a system of residential water pipes was found under the proposed park's terrain, which led to the cancellation of the project.

== See also ==
- List of water parks
