= Universal Orlando =

Resort complex in Orange County, Florida, U.S.

Coordinates: 28°28′25″N 81°28′00″W

Universal Orlando Resort

- The Universal Globe, with CityWalk and Islands of Adventure visible in the background, as seen at sunset. (August 2021)
- Formerly: Universal Studios Escape (1998–2000)
- Type: Division
- Industry: Hospitality; Entertainment
- Founded: June 7, 1990; 36 years ago
- Founders: MCA Universal (50%); The Rank Organisation (50%)
- Headquarters: Orlando, Florida, U.S.
- Key people: Karen Irwin (president)
- Products: Three theme parks; One water park; 11 resort hotels; One entertainment district
- Services: Hotels; Entertainment
- Owner: Universal City Development Partners, LTD
- Number of employees: 28,000 (2024)
- Parent: Universal Destinations & Experiences
- Website: www.universalorlando.com

Universal Orlando Resort, commonly shortened to Universal Orlando, is an entertainment resort complex located in Orlando, Florida, United States. It is composed of three theme parks, one water park, and 11 resort hotels. Spanning 1,291 acres (522 ha), the resort is the flagship of the Universal Destinations & Experiences theme park chain.

Following the success of Universal Studios Florida, which opened in June 1990, MCA Universal – and later Seagram – shifted into transforming the area into a large resort, with the intention of competing with Walt Disney World. The first major expansion occurred in 1999 with the opening of a second theme park, Universal Islands of Adventure, along with a shopping promenade and nightlife district called Universal CityWalk. Both additions helped to form the new resort, which was briefly dubbed Universal Studios Escape. The resort expanded further in 2017 with the addition of Universal Volcano Bay, a 30-acre (12 ha) water theme park, and again in 2025 with a fourth theme park, Universal Epic Universe.

Notable additions over the years include multiple hotels as well as The Wizarding World of Harry Potter themed areas, which spans both theme parks and significantly boosted attendance at the entire resort. The resort complex also hosts well-known annual events, such as Universal's Halloween Horror Nights, along with a variety of live entertainment and shows. The resort's hotels are managed by Loews Hotels & Resorts, including the Hard Rock Hotel Orlando, which is owned in a joint venture partnership made up of Hard Rock International, Lowes Hotels & Resorts, and Universal Destination & Experiences.

Universal Orlando ranks as one of the most visited resorts in the world with an annual attendance of 21 million as of 2017. Guests staying at the resort's hotels receive special perks such as early admission into the theme parks, and in some cases, benefits such as free Universal Express Pass, which gives access to shorter lines at major attractions. The resort also features an organized transportation system, including water taxis, pathways, buses, and moving walkways that connect many of the area's hotels and theme parks.

== History ==
=== Background ===
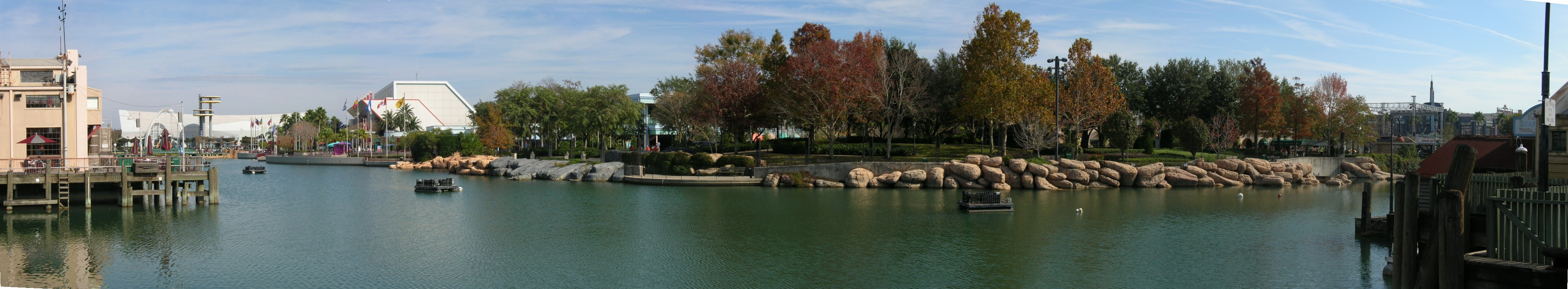
Panoramic view of Universal Studios Florida's lagoon (December 2005)

The original portion of the resort, Universal Studios Florida, opened on June 7, 1990, as a theme park that let visitors "Ride the Movies". The park is composed of themed areas, rides, and attractions based on the film industry. Visitors also get to experience themed dining, shopping, and a variety of special events throughout the year.

The themes of Universal Studios Florida are targeted at making guests feel like they are on movie sets with rides, shows and attractions inspired by popular film, television, and music productions, such as The Simpsons Ride, Fast & Furious: Hollywood Drift, and Despicable Me Minion Mayhem as of 2026.

=== 1993–2000: Expanding from one park to a resort ===
Loews Portofino Bay Hotel (November 2014)

Universal Entertainment, which was owned by MCA Inc. at the time, formed a 50/50 joint venture with British conglomerate The Rank Organisation, (Note: Later The Rank Group plc.) and announced on September 16, 1993, that Universal Studios Florida would undergo a multibillion-dollar expansion to transform it into a full-scale resort initially known as Universal City, Florida, designed to compete with Walt Disney World Resort. A second park would be constructed, heavily themed around Jurassic Park, and director Steven Spielberg signed on as a creative consultant for the new dinosaur-themed park and attractions. 5,000 construction jobs, and 14,000 permanent jobs were estimated to be created.

Five hotels, a nighttime entertainment district that would initially be called the E-Zone before being renamed to Universal CityWalk would be added, alongside additional sound stages and recreational facilities would be added. In late 1995, construction began with the demolition of the original open parking lot for Universal Studios Florida. Universal partnered with Loews Hotels & Co., a subsidiary of Loews Corporation, in early May 1996 to develop a 750-room Portofino Bay resort. In 1997, Universal, which was now owned by Seagram Company at the time, publicly announced final plans for the $2.5 billion expansion, which would now be known as the Universal Studios Escape resort. CityWalk would span 30 acres (12 ha). The Jurassic Park-themed attraction was renamed Universal Islands of Adventure. The Preview Center opened in the New York area, replacing The Screen Test Home Video Adventure, giving guests a preview of the upcoming Islands of Adventure park, as well as the resort expansion.

In March 1998, Universal Studios Escape had its grand opening celebration. Universal acquired Wet 'n Wild Orlando in October of that year. In October 1998, the Wet 'n Wild Orlando water park was acquired by Universal Parks & Resorts, (Note: Former name of Universal Destinations & Experiences.) adding it to the planned resort. Universal CityWalk Orlando opened in early February 1999, featuring Jimmy Buffett's Margaritaville and the world's largest Hard Rock Cafe. Islands of Adventure would open next door to Universal Studios Florida on May 28, 1999, after a two-month-long soft opening. Loews Portofino Bay Hotel would open on September 10, 1999, as the resort's first on-site hotel.

On July 9, 2000, Universal Studios Escape was renamed Universal Orlando Resort to stop name confusion, as guests mistakenly thought Islands of Adventure was just a new themed land or marketing slogan inside the original Universal Studios Florida, rather than being a separate theme park. This misconception led to lower-than-expected early attendance numbers following the completion of the expansion. That year, The Rank Group sold its shares to Blackstone Capital Partners for $275 million.

=== 2001–present: Further resort expansion ===
A 650-room Hard Rock Hotel, which was the resort's second on-site hotel and Hard Rock's third hotel in the world, (Note: Previous two: Hard Rock Hotel and Casino (Las Vegas), Hard Rock Hotel Bali) had a soft opening on January 19, 2001, which would be followed by a grand opening at around late February of that year. On June 19, 2002, the 1,000-room Loews Royal Pacific Resort opened as Universal Orlando's third on-site hotel.

On May 31, 2007, Universal, in partnership with Warner Bros. Entertainment, announced that The Wizarding World of Harry Potter – Hogsmeade would be built at Islands of Adventure. The attraction opened on June 18, 2010. Blackstone Capital sold its interest to NBCUniversal for $3.165 billion in June 2011, giving the latter full ownership of the resort. On December 2, 2011, Universal announced that Jaws: The Ride – along with the entire Amity area of Universal Studios Florida – would close permanently on January 2, 2012, to "make room for an exciting, NEW, experience", which would be the second phase of The Wizarding World of Harry Potter - Diagon Alley. Phase I of Universal's Cabana Bay Beach Resort opened on March 31, 2014, with the hotel planning to feature 1,800 rooms with retro 1950s and 60s aesthetics. Phase II would open on June 16, 2014. Diagon Alley officially opened to the public on July 8, 2014.

Loews Sapphire Falls Resort entrance (January 2025)

Lobby of the Loews Sapphire Falls Resort (January 2025)

Universal Orlando's fifth hotel, Loews Sapphire Falls Resort, opened on July 14, 2016, with 1,000 guest rooms and 77 to 83 suites, bringing Universal Orlando's total on-site hotel room count to 5,200 at the time. Wet 'n Wild would close permanently on December 31, 2016, and would be replaced with a new water park called Universal Volcano Bay, which opened on May 25, 2017. It was announced on March 21, 2017, that a portion of the land once occupied by Wet 'n Wild would be transformed into what would become the property's seventh and eighth hotels. In early November of that year the plans were altered to split the property into two hotels that were part of one resort.

In August 2018, the 600-room and suite Universal's Aventura Hotel, which was the resort's sixth hotel, opened. Universal unveiled the specific plans for the two hotels in mid-November 2018, detailing that a 750-room hotel with two suites would be added, known as Universal's Endless Summer Resort – Surfside Inn and Suites. The opening date for the hotel was in the summer of 2019. The Dockside Inn and Suites, also part of Universal's Endless Summer Resort, opened on December 15, 2020, after a delay due to the COVID-19 pandemic.

On August 1, 2019, NBCUniversal announced that it would be building a fourth theme park called Universal Epic Universe. When announcing the project, Universal stated that the project would create 14,000 jobs. Brian Roberts, the CEO of Comcast, called Epic Universe "the largest investment we've ever made in a park". The Universal Epic Universe Preview Center opened in June 2024, providing a scale model of the new park, as well as selling merchandise of the four lands that are part of it. Epic Universe opened on May 22, 2025, featuring three hotels: Universal Stella Nova Resort and Universal Terra Luna Resort, with 750 rooms, and the 500-room Universal Helios Grand Hotel. It introduced five immersive worlds to Universal Orlando Resort being, Celestial Park, How To Train Your Dragon: Isle Of Berk, Super Nintendo World, Dark Universe, and the Wizarding World Of Harry Potter: Ministry Of Magic.

Universal Parks & Resorts announced the closure of the resort effective March 15, 2020, due to the rapid spread of the COVID-19 pandemic, initially until the end of the month. In April 2020, NBCUniversal announced the park's opening would be delayed until 2024 due to the pandemic. In July 2020, NBCUniversal announced that they would be pausing development on the new theme park "until the future becomes more certain". Work on Epic Universe resumed in May 2021.

== Theme parks ==
=== Universal Studios Florida ===
Universal Studios Florida features eight themed areas all situated around a large lagoon. The eight surrounding themed areas, clockwise from the entrance, are Minion Land on Illumination Ave, New York, San Francisco, The Wizarding World of Harry Potter – Diagon Alley / London, World Expo, Springfield, DreamWorks Land, and Hollywood. Each area features a combination of rides, shows, attractions, character appearances, dining outlets, and retail outlets.

Universal Studios Florida features several seasonal events throughout the year, some of which are included in daily park admission, while others are separately-ticketed events. These events include Universal's Halloween Horror Nights, which takes place annually in late September, October, and early November.

In 2025, Universal Studios Florida had an annual attendance of 9,300,000 and was ranked as the 13th most visited theme park in the world.

=== Universal Islands of Adventure ===
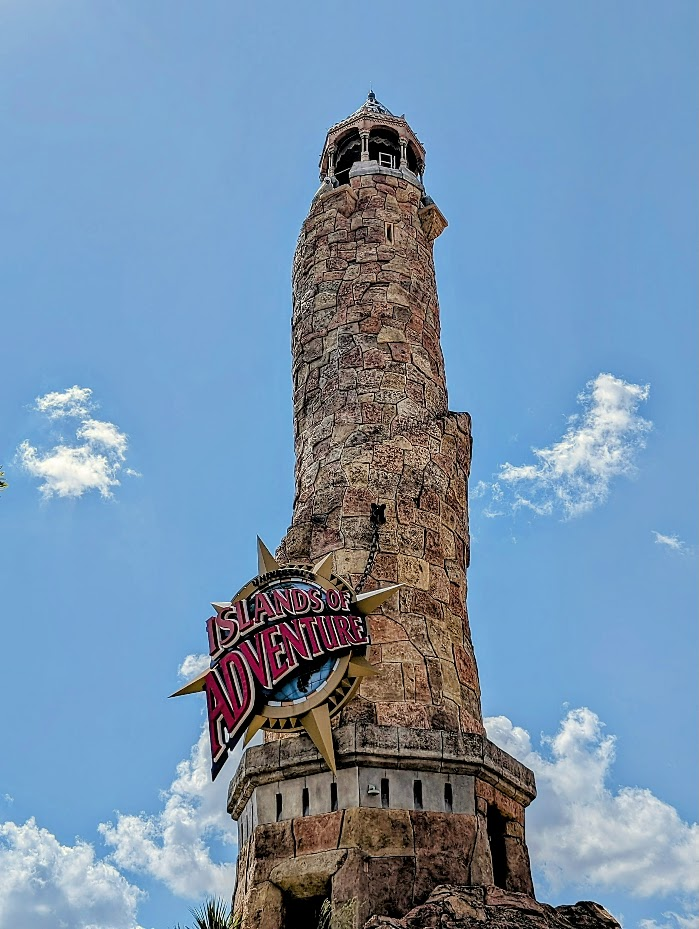
The Pharos Lighthouse, the entrance to Islands of Adventure. (September 2024)

Universal Islands of Adventure is composed of eight distinct "islands" that are themed to various forms of literature, adventure genres, cartoons and comics, and mythical fantasies. Visitors start off in the Port of Entry and make their way through the various islands – Marvel Super Hero Island, Toon Lagoon, Skull Island, Jurassic Park, The Wizarding World of Harry Potter - Hogsmeade, the Lost Continent, and Seuss Landing. The Wizarding World of Harry Potter, based on the popular Harry Potter franchise, as well as Skull Island, based on the 2005 King Kong film, are the only islands that were added after the park opened. Hogsmeade opened to the public on June 18, 2010, and Skull Island opened to the public on July 13, 2016.

=== Universal Volcano Bay ===
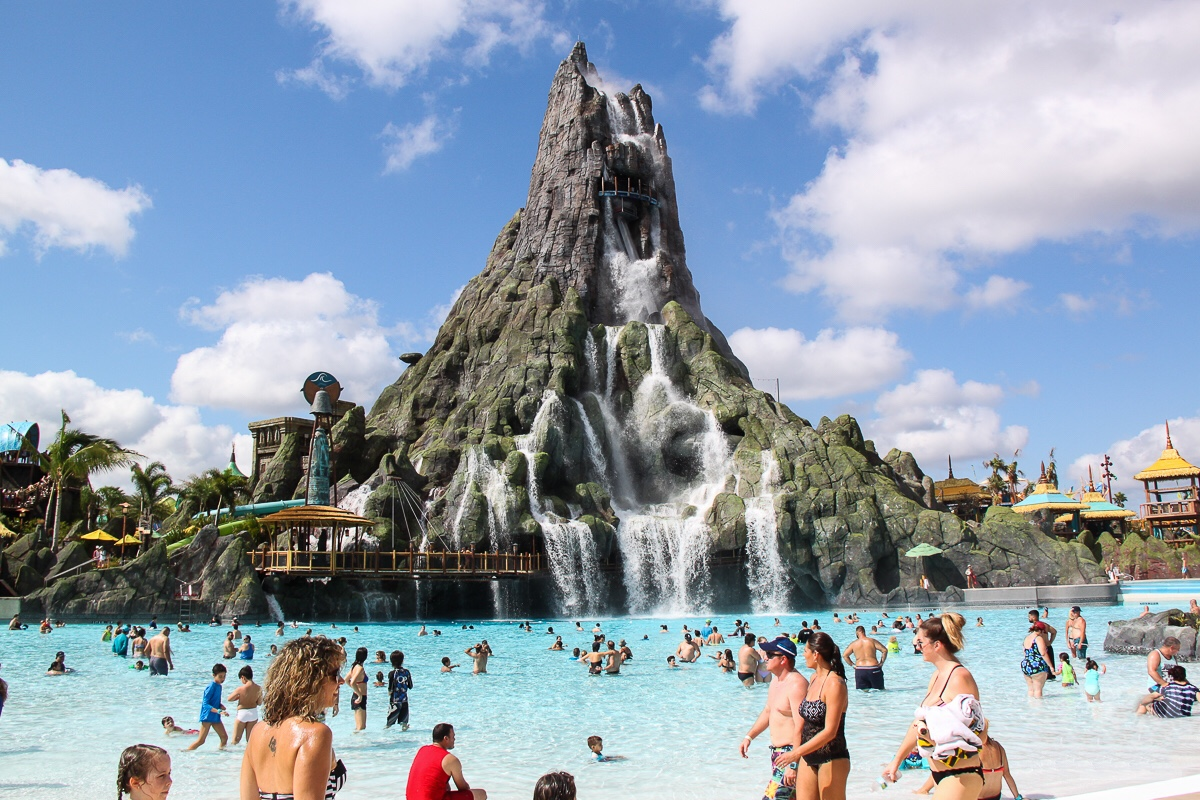
The Krakatau volcano is the icon of Volcano Bay. (September 2017)

Universal Volcano Bay is a 27-acre (11 ha) water theme park, replacing Wet 'n Wild. Wet 'n Wild was founded in 1977 by SeaWorld founder George Millay as one of the first major water parks.

There were eighteen water slides and attractions at the water park. Popular attractions included the Storm, Bomb Bay, Disco H2O, Mach 5, and the Surge. Wet 'n Wild was located at the intersection of International Drive and Universal Boulevard, about half a mile south of the Universal Orlando parking garage.

=== Universal Epic Universe ===
Universal Epic Universe is located a few miles south of the existing resort within a larger 750-acre (300 ha) site. There are five lands including a central hub, Celestial Park, and four other areas themed to How to Train Your Dragon, Wizarding Paris from the Fantastic Beasts franchise, Universal Monsters and Super Nintendo World. Stella Nova and Terra Luna are space themed hotels and are walking distance from the park, while the Helios Grand Hotel is a hotel themed to the god Helios and has direct access to the park. The complex also includes dining and retail facilities.

== Universal CityWalk ==
Concourse of the complex (November 2014)

Universal CityWalk serves as the resort's nightlife and entertainment district, functioning as the main pedestrian entrance to Universal Studios Florida and Islands of Adventure, connecting the parks to the resort's parking garages and transportation hub.

The center is anchored by the Universal Studios Store, offering merchandise from the three parks, as well as Bubba Gump Shrimp Co., a 20-screen Cinemark Theatres, and several other restaurants and nightclubs.

In 2026, Universal Orlando Resort has announced several changes coming to CityWalk, including the return of Universal Legacy Store and closure of the BK Whopper Bar.

== Resort hotels ==
Universal Orlando features 11 official hotels, totaling up to 11,000 rooms. They are organized into three categories: Signature Collection, Prime Value Hotels, and Value Inn and Suites. The hotels are located across three areas: adjacent to Universal CityWalk, near Epic Universe, and along the International Drive corridor.

Name	Opening date	Theme	Number of rooms	Resort area
Signature Collection				
Loews Portofino Bay Hotel at Universal Orlando	September 10, 1999	Italian seaside village	750	CityWalk
Hard Rock Hotel at Universal Orlando	January 19, 2001	Rock and roll; California mission design	650	CityWalk
Loews Royal Pacific Resort at Universal Orlando	June 19, 2002	The enchanted isles of the South Seas	1,000	CityWalk
Loews Sapphire Falls Resort at Universal Orlando	July 7, 2016	Leisurely estate in the heart of the tropics	1,000	CityWalk
Universal Helios Grand Hotel	May 22, 2025	Elegant Mediterranean-inspired feel	500	Epic Universe
Prime Value Hotels				
Universal's Aventura Hotel	August 16, 2018	Modern aesthetic	600	CityWalk
Universal Stella Nova Resort	January 21, 2025	Infinite universe	750	Epic Universe
Universal Terra Luna Resort	March 25, 2025	Terrestrial exploration	750	Epic Universe
Value Inns and Suites				
Universal's Cabana Bay Beach Resort	March 31, 2014	Classic Florida beach resorts of the 1950s and 60s	2,200	CityWalk
Universal's Endless Summer Resort - Surfside Inn and Suites	June 27, 2019	Surfing lifestyle	750	International Drive
Universal's Endless Summer Resort - Dockside Inn and Suites	December 15, 2020	Coastal retreat	2,050	International Drive

Hard Rock Hotel at sunset (February 2005)

Hard Rock Hotel at Universal Orlando was developed as a joint venture between Universal, Loews Hotels & Co., and the Rank Group, featuring a 12,000-square-foot (1,100 m^{2}) pool, and a massive front fountain showcasing 42 bronze guitars in a double helix, and over $1 million worth of music memorabilia. The hotel was designed by Hill Glazier Architects. In 2007, Hard Rock International was acquired by the Seminole Tribe of Florida, which included a stake in the hotel joint venture.

The Cabana Bay Beach Resort's first phase opened with the Jack LaLanne Physical Fitness Studio, a 10,000-square-foot (930 m^{2}) pool, the North Courtyard, a bowling alley known as Galaxy Studio, and Bayliner Diner. Its second phase debuted with The Hideaway Bar & Grill, and the Lazy River Courtyard.

The Loews Sapphire Falls Resort featured a 16,000-square-foot (1,500 m^{2}) pool, a 100 feet (1,200 in) water slide, a children's water play area, and hot tub when it opened, with restaurants StrongWater Tavern, Drhum Club Kantine, New Dutch Trading Co., and the Amatista Cookhouse.

== Events ==
=== Universal's Halloween Horror Nights ===
On select nights in September through early November, Universal Studios Florida is transformed for the annual Halloween event, Halloween Horror Nights, or commonly shortened to HHN. It is one of the largest Halloween events in the U.S.

=== Rock the Universe ===
Rock the Universe is an annual Christian rock music festival that is located within Universal Studios Florida. It began in 1998 and has been running ever since. The event typically occurs in early September and lasts for two days. In 2019, Rock the Universe took place in early February for the first time ever. Many Christian rock artists play throughout the event both nights.

=== Grad Bash and Gradventure ===
Grad Bash and Gradventure are two separate events held in April and May at the parks. Grad Bash is an event for graduating high school senior classes who can gather for an exclusive, all-night party at Universal Studios Florida and Islands of Adventure. It allows attendees to ride all attractions at both parks. This event also features live performances by some of the most popular artists, dance parties with DJs, and pre-parties at the Universal Music Plaza Stage in the Production Central section of Universal Studios Florida. Gradventure is very similar but is promoted for graduating middle school students. Both events are sponsored by Coca-Cola.

=== Universal's Holiday Parade featuring Macy's ===
Macy's Holiday Parade brings authentic balloons that are based on attractions in the parks in an event that lasts in November and December, highlighting the Christmas celebrations within Universal Studios Florida.

=== Mardi Gras ===
From February through April, a parade and concert series inspired by New Orleans' Mardi Gras party, is held within Universal Studios Florida. The event features merchandise especially for the celebration and is held usually on Friday and Saturday nights. Every event night guests will hear some of Louisiana's bands performing blues and zydeco.

== Attendance ==
Year	Universal Studios Florida	Islands of Adventure	Epic Universe	Total (theme parks)	Volcano Bay	Ref
2006	6,000,000	5,300,000		11,300,000		
2007	6,200,000	5,430,000		11,630,000		
2008	6,231,000	5,297,000		11,528,000		
2009	5,530,000	4,627,000		10,157,000		
2010	5,949,000	5,925,000		11,874,000		
2011	6,044,000	7,674,000		13,718,000		
2012	6,195,000	7,981,000		14,176,000		
2013	7,062,000	8,141,000		15,203,000		
2014	8,263,000	8,141,000		16,444,000		
2015	9,585,000	8,792,000		18,377,000		
2016	9,998,000	9,962,000		19,960,000		
2017	10,198,000	9,549,000		19,747,000	1,500,000	
2018	10,708,000	9,788,000		20,496,000	1,725,000	
2019	10,922,000	10,375,000		21,297,000	1,811,000	
2020	4,096,000	4,005,000		8,101,000	551,000	
2021	8,987,000	9,077,000		18,064,000	1,691,000	
2022	10,750,000	11,025,000		21,775,000	1,850,000	
2023	9,750,000	10,000,000		19,750,000	1,800,000	
2024	9,500,000	9,450,000		18,950,000	1,650,000	
2025	9,300,000	9,200,000	4,000,000	22,500,000	1,600,000	

Note: Total attendance includes Universal Studios Florida, Islands of Adventure, and Epic Universe (beginning in 2025). Volcano Bay is excluded from the total.

== Transportation ==
Universal Orlando Resort operates a transportation network consisting of shuttle buses, water taxis, and pedestrian pathways connecting its theme parks, hotels, and Universal CityWalk. Water taxis connect select resort hotels to CityWalk, while shuttle buses connect the resort's hotels and theme parks, including Universal Epic Universe, which is located south of and separate from the original resort complex. Pedestrian pathways also connect the hotels to different parts of the resort.

The resort's transportation services also include the Universal SuperStar Shuttle, a paid airport transfer service connecting Orlando International Airport with several Universal Orlando hotels.

In February 2026, the Shingle Creek Transit and Utility Community Development District selected The Boring Company to begin negotiations for a proposed underground transportation system connecting CityWalk with Epic Universe. As of November 2026, no construction timeline has been announced.

== Gallery ==
Theme parks inside Universal Orlando: Islands of Adventure (green), Universal Studios Florida (orange), Volcano Bay (red), Epic Universe (magenta)

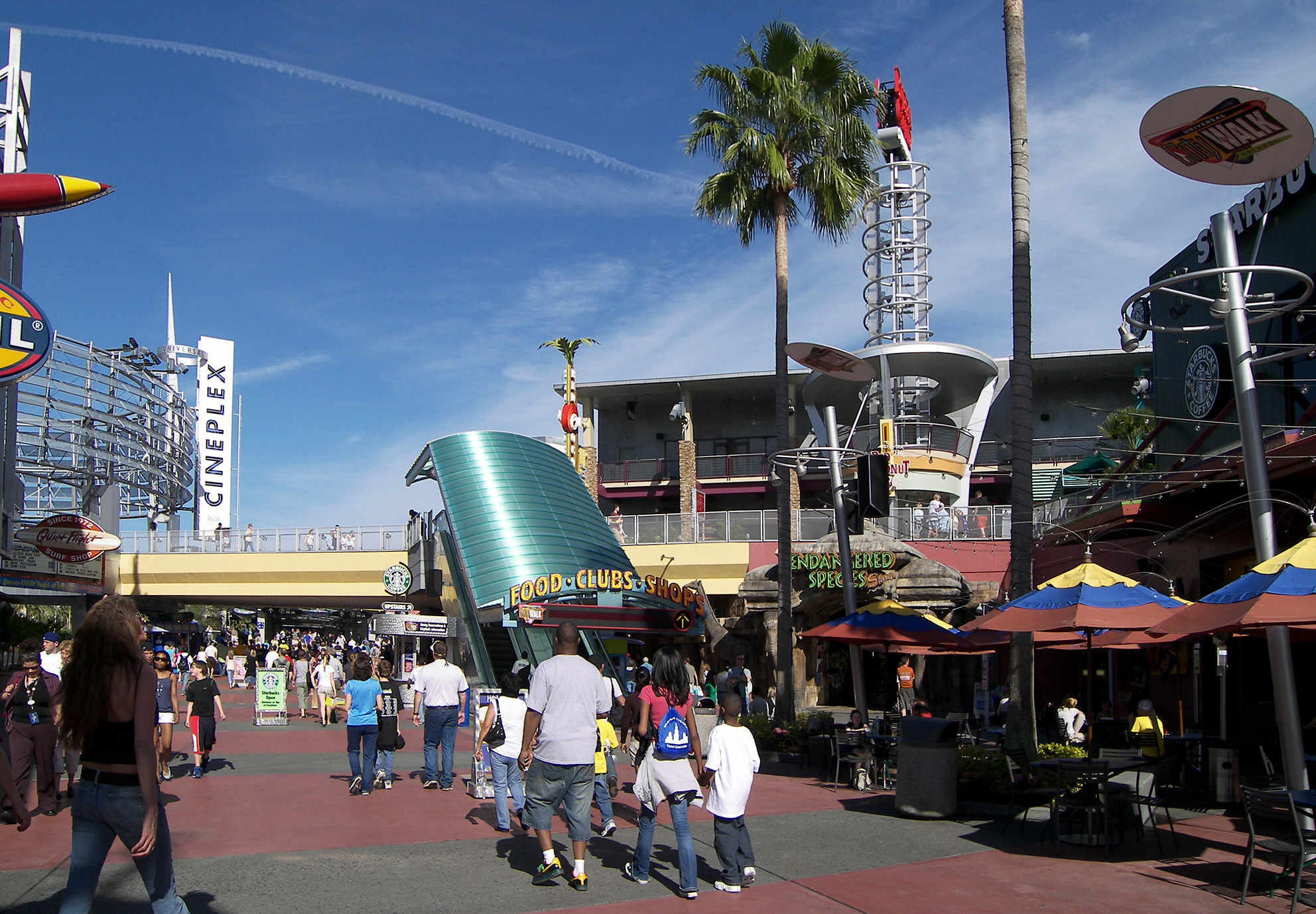
Universal CityWalk in March 2008

Pool at the Loews Royal Pacific Resort (September 2025)

Bubba Gump (September 2025)

Jimmy Buffett's Margaritaville entrance (July 2016)

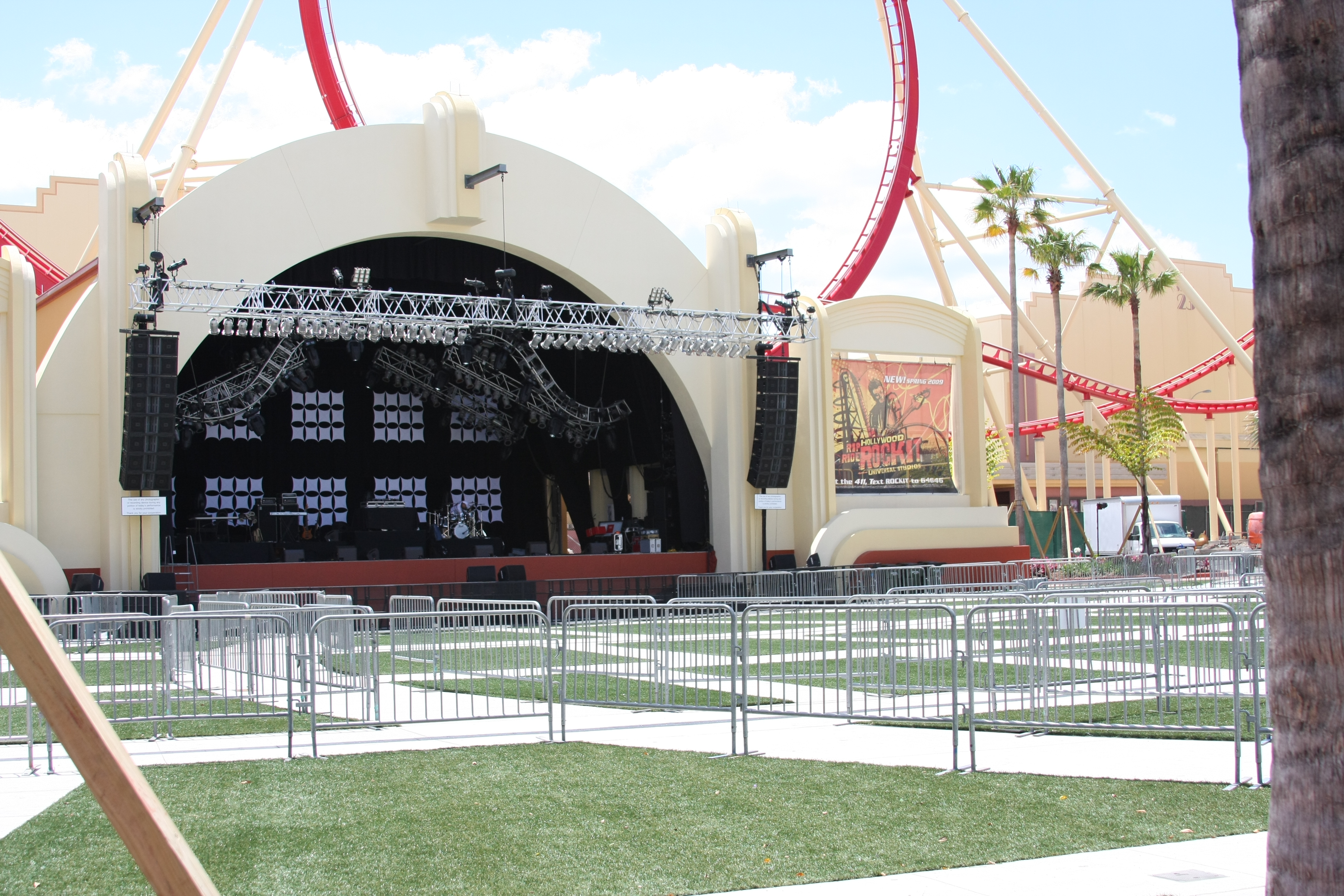
Universal Music Plaza Stage (April 2009)

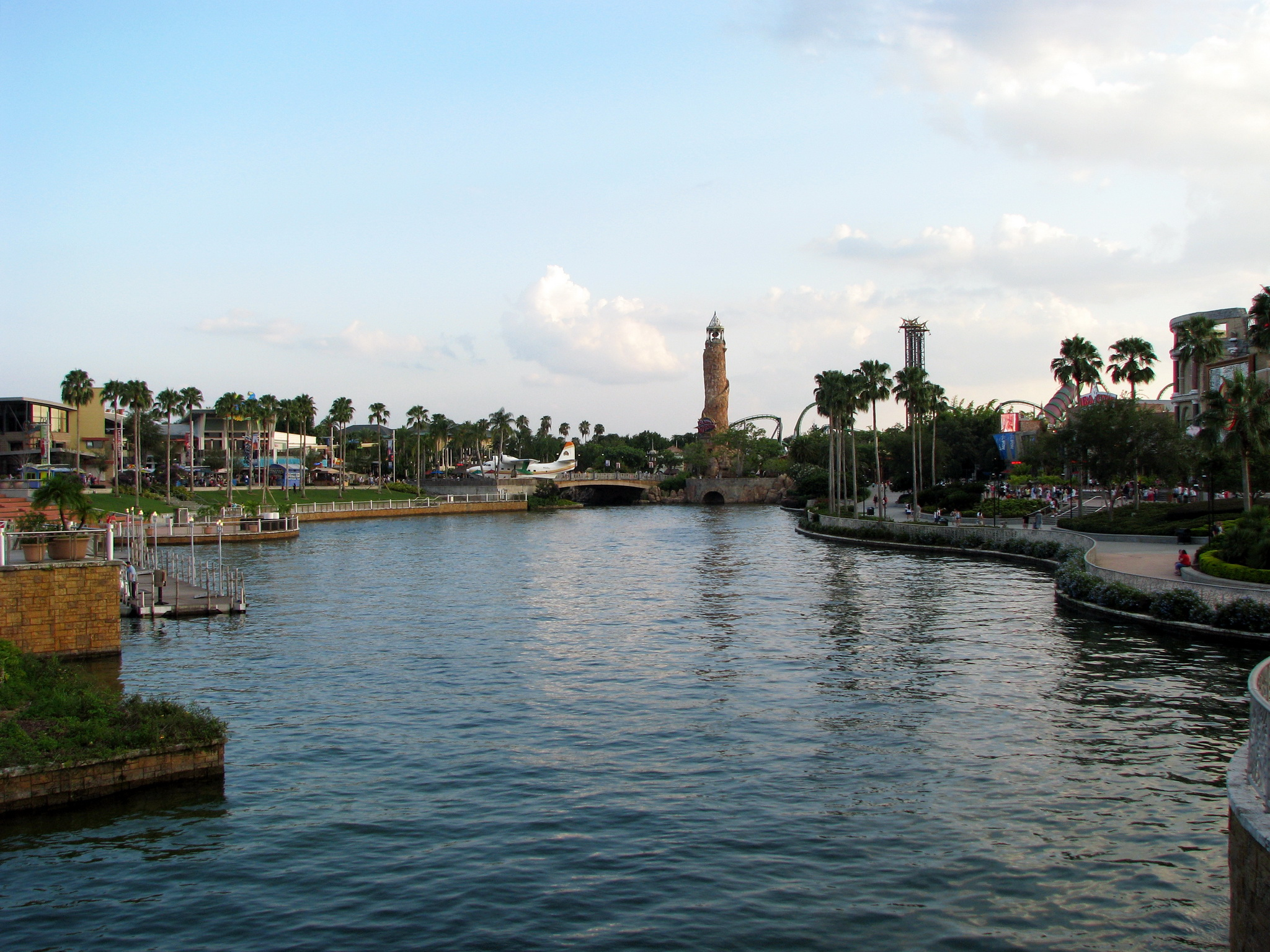
Waterway in CityWalk, at the center of Universal Orlando (August 2013)

AMC Universal Cineplex 20 (March 2014)

NASCAR Cafe (June 2005)

== See also ==
- Florida tourism industry
- Incidents at Universal Orlando
- Legoland Florida
