= Loews Hotel Tower =

Skyscraper in Chicago, Illinois

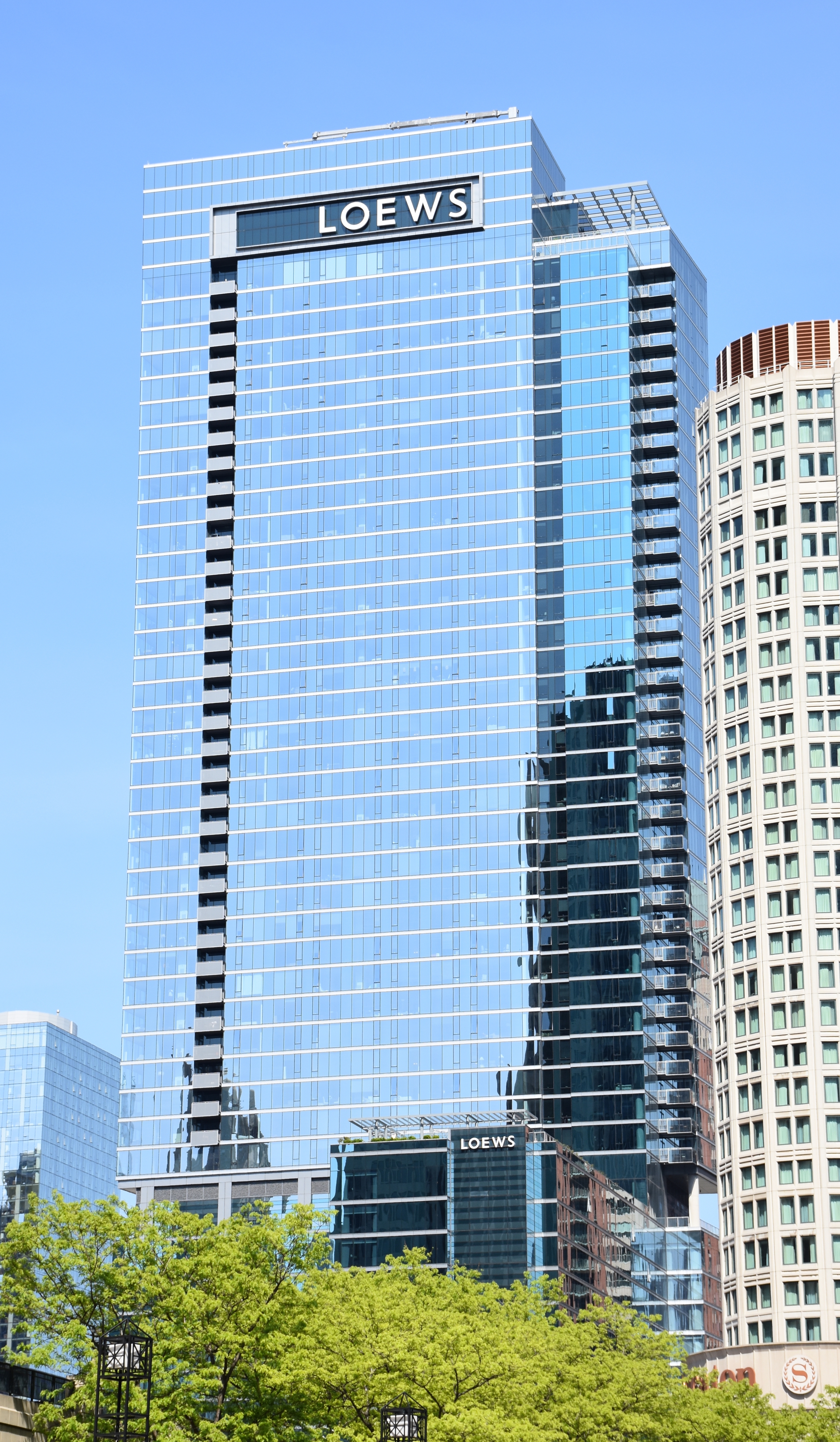
- Photo taken May 22, 2016.
- Interactive map of the Loews Hotel Tower area
- Hotel chain: Loews Hotels

General information
- Status: Completed
- Type: Hotel, residential
- Location: 455 North Park Drive, Chicago, Illinois
- Coordinates: 41.8898851°N 87.6194258°W
- Construction started: 2012
- Completed: 2015
- Owner: DRW Holdings

Height
- Roof: 569 ft (173.4 m)

Technical details
- Floor count: 54
- Floor area: 86,121 m^{2} (927,000 sq ft)

Design and construction
- Architect: Solomon Cordwell Buenz
- Developer: DRW Holdings
- Structural engineer: Magnusson Klemencic Associates
- Main contractor: Lend Lease

Other information
- Number of rooms: 400

Website
- www.loewshotels.com/chicago-downtown

455 North Park Drive or Loews Hotel Tower, also known as Loews North Park Drive, is a 54-story 569 ft (173.4 m) tall skyscraper located at 455 North Park Drive in Chicago, Illinois that is owned by Loews Hotels. The 52-floor building has 86,121 m^{2} (927,000 sq ft) of floor space. It has 400 hotel rooms, 398 rental apartments, and assorted ballrooms, bars, restaurants and parking spaces. All apartments were sold for $240.4 million. It is based on an L-shaped twelve-storey podium. It was the tallest building built in the city in 2015.

It was designed by Chicago architects Solomon Cordwell Buenz and developed by the DRW Trading Group of Chicago. The construction cost was about $200 million.

== See also ==
- List of tallest buildings in Chicago
