= Wet 'n Wild Emerald Pointe =

Water park in North Carolina, United States

- Interactive map of Wet 'n Wild Emerald Pointe
- Location: Greensboro, North Carolina, United States
- Coordinates: 36°0′27″N 79°50′25″W
- Owner: Lucky Strike Entertainment
- Opened: September 1983; 42 years ago
- Previous names: Aqua Gardens; Water Country USA; Emerald Pointe
- Operating season: Memorial Day – Labor Day
- Status: Operating
- Visitors per annum: 406,000
- Area: 40 acres (160,000 m^{2})
- Pools: 5 pools
- Water slides: 15 water slides
- Children's areas: 2 children's areas
- Website: www.emeraldpointe.com

Wet 'n Wild Emerald Pointe (often simply referred to as Wet 'n Wild or Emerald Pointe) is a water park located in Greensboro, North Carolina, United States, and part of the Wet 'n Wild brand of parks.

There are 40 rides and attractions, including 5 pools, 2 children's areas, and one of the largest wave pools in the country. The Themed Entertainment Association has ranked the park 20th in North America in terms of attendance, of which they had 407,000 visitors as of 2015.

A major regional competitor is Carowinds' Carolina Harbor in Charlotte, North Carolina.

== History ==
Originally named Aqua Gardens, the park opened in 1984 after a preview run in September 1983. Aqua Gardens was originally supposed to have an indoor mall, but due to financial problems, the mall was never built. From 1985 to 1986, it used the name Water Country USA.

In 1986, it was purchased by a local company and renamed Emerald Pointe. In March 1999 Ogden Corp purchased the property, along with Raging Waters and Wet 'n Wild's assets, and renamed the park Wet 'n Wild Emerald Pointe.

In 2019, the newest attraction "Bombs Away" was revealed at the end of the season to the public and was originally slated to open for the 2020 season. Due to the Covid-19 Pandemic, it has been delayed to open for the 2022 Season.

In July 2025, the same year it was sold to Herschend Family Entertainment, the park was again sold to Lucky Strike Entertainment.

== Rides and attractions ==
=== Current attractions ===
Name	Opened	Manufacturer	Type
Bermuda Triangle (formerly Serpentine Slides)	2023 (1995/1996)	iSlide	Enclosed body slide
Bombs Away	2022	Proslide	Free fall and enclosed body slide
Riptide Racer	2015	Fibrart	Four racing mat slides
Dr. Von Dark's Tunnel of Terror	2009	ProSlide	Enclosed funnel tube slide
Dragon's Den	2005	Proslide	"Toilet Bowl" open tube slide
Tropical Drop	2004	Proslide	Small body slide
The Edge	2004	Water Fun	Half-pipe water slide
Double Barrel Blast	1996	Proslide	Two short freefall body slides
Shipwreck Cove	1984		Large pool
Lazee River	1986		Lazy river
Leisure Lagoon	1984		Small pool
Raging Rapids	1986		Inline tube slide
Runaway Raft Ride	1997	Proslide	Inline tube slide
Splash Island	2000	ADG	Children's area
Scooter Run	2000	Proslide	Small inline tube slide
Happy Harbor	1994		Children's area
Cyclone Zone	1995		Toroid-shaped pool
Daredevil Drop	1998	Proslide	Freefall body slide
Thunder Bay Wave Pool	1986		Wave pool
Twin Twisters	2000	Proslide	Two enclosed body slides
Soak Zone	2013		Children's area

=== Former attractions ===
Name	Opened	Closed	Manufacturer	Type
Bonzai Pipeline/Speed Slides	1984	2014		Two freefall tube slides
White Water Run	1984	2008		Three inline tube slides, Twister, Dragon’s Tail, and Easy Rider.
Skycoaster	1994	2008		Skycoaster
Pirate's Plunge	1984	2001		Pulley ride
Hydra Fighter II	2001	2003	Caprio	Water roller coaster

== See also ==
- Wet 'n Wild (brand)
