= Loews Hotels =

American luxury hospitality company

- Type: Subsidiary
- Industry: Hospitality
- Founded: 1960; 66 years ago
- Headquarters: 667 Madison Avenue; New York, United States
- Parent: Loews Corporation
- Website: www.loewshotels.com

Loews Hotels is an American luxury hospitality company that owns or operates 26 hotels in the United States and Canada. Headquartered in New York City, Loews Hotels is a wholly owned subsidiary of Loews Corporation.

The company was originally co-owned by billionaire Preston Robert Tisch. In 1989, his 36-year-old son Jonathan Tisch was appointed CEO. The following year, the younger Tisch created the "Good Neighbor Policy" to donate left-over food, hotel furniture, and dry goods to local communities. In 1996, the company received a President's Volunteer Service Award.

In 2009, Jonathan Tisch was the chairman. Alex Tisch, the company's former president, took over as CEO in 2023.

== Properties ==
=== United States ===
- Loews Ventana Canyon Resort, Tucson, Arizona
- Loews Coronado Bay Resort, Coronado, California
- Loews Hollywood Hotel, Hollywood, California - formerly Renaissance Hollywood Hotel, before that Holiday Inn Hollywood
- Loews Coral Gables Hotel, Coral Gables, Florida
- Loews Miami Beach Hotel, Miami Beach, Florida
- Loews Portofino Bay Hotel at Universal Orlando Resort, Orlando, Florida
- Hard Rock Hotel at Universal Orlando Resort, Orlando, Florida
- Loews Royal Pacific Resort at Universal Orlando Resort, Orlando, Florida
- Loews Sapphire Falls Resort at Universal Orlando Resort, Orlando, Florida
- Universal Cabana Bay Beach Resort at Universal Orlando Resort, Orlando, Florida
- Universal Aventura Hotel at Universal Orlando Resort, Orlando, Florida
- Universal's Endless Summer Resort - Surfside Inn and Suites at Universal Orlando Resort, Orlando, Florida
- Universal's Endless Summer Resort - Dockside Inn and Suites at Universal Orlando Resort, Orlando, Florida
- Universal Helios Grand Hotel at Universal Orlando Resort, Orlando, Florida
- Universal Stella Nova Resort at Universal Orlando Resort, Orlando, Florida
- Universal Terra Luna Resort at Universal Orlando Resort, Orlando, Florida
- Loews Atlanta Hotel, Atlanta, Georgia
- Loews Chicago Hotel, Chicago, Illinois
- Loews Chicago O'Hare, Rosemont, Illinois
- Loews New Orleans Hotel, New Orleans, Louisiana
- Loews Kansas City Hotel, Kansas City, Missouri
- Live! by Loews, St. Louis, Missouri
- Loews Regency New York, New York, New York
- Loews Philadelphia Hotel, Philadelphia, Pennsylvania
- Loews Nashville Hotel at Vanderbilt Plaza, Nashville, Tennessee
- Loews Arlington Hotel, Arlington, Texas
- Live! by Loews, Arlington, Texas

=== Canada ===
- Bisha Hotel, Toronto, Ontario

== Future properties ==
- The Americana by Loews, Arlington, Texas

== Former properties ==
=== United States ===
- Loews Paradise Valley Resort, Scottsdale, Arizona - now DoubleTree Resort by Hilton Hotel Paradise Valley - Scottsdale
- Hotel Mark Hopkins, San Francisco, California
- Loews Regency San Francisco, San Francisco, California, 2015-2019 - now Four Seasons Hotel San Francisco at Embarcadero
- Loews Santa Monica Beach Hotel, Santa Monica, California - now Regent Santa Monica Beach
- Loews Giorgio Hotel (later Loews Denver Hotel), Glendale, Colorado, 1989-2013 - now Hyatt Place Denver/Cherry Creek
- The Madison, A Loews Hotel (later Loews Madison Hotel), Washington, D.C., 2006-2011 and 2013-2017 - now The Madison Washington DC, a Hilton Hotel
- Loews L'Enfant Plaza Hotel, Washington, D.C., 1973-2013, now Hilton Washington DC National Mall The Wharf
- Americana of Bal Harbour, Bal Harbour, Florida - demolished
- Loews Don CeSar Hotel, St. Pete Beach, Florida, 2003 to 2017 - now The Don CeSar
- The Hotels Ambassador, Chicago, Illinois - The Ambassador East is now Ambassador Chicago Hotel, The Ambassador West is now The Ambassador Condominiums
- Loews Annapolis Hotel, Annapolis, Maryland, until 2018 - now Graduate Annapolis
- Loews Boston Hotel, Boston, Massachusetts - now Hotel AKA Back Bay
- Loews Minneapolis Hotel, Minneapolis, Minnesota, 2014 to 2024 - now The Lofton Hotel Minneapolis, Tapestry Collection by Hilton
- Loews Lake Las Vegas Resort, Henderson, Nevada, 2006 to 2012 - now Westin Lake Las Vegas
- The Traymore, Atlantic City, New Jersey - demolished
- Loews Glenpointe Hotel, Teaneck, New Jersey - now Teaneck Marriott at Glenpointe
- Loew's Midtown Motor Inn / Ramada Inn, New York, New York - now Kimpton Hotel Theta New York (formerly Hilton Garden Inn Times Square, before that Days Inn)
- City Squire Motor Inn, New York, New York - now The Manhattan at Times Square Hotel
- Howard Johnson's Motor Lodge, New York, New York - now Hampton Inn Manhattan-Times Square North
- Loews Summit Hotel, New York, New York - now FOUND Study Midtown East Residences
- The Drake, New York, New York - demolished
- The Warwick, New York, New York - now Warwick New York Hotel
- Americana of New York, New York, New York - now Sheraton New York Times Square Hotel
- Loews Anatole Hotel, Dallas, Texas, 1979 to 1995 - now Hilton Anatole
- Loews Hotel 1000 Seattle, Seattle, Washington - now Hotel 1000, LXR Hotels & Resorts

=== Canada ===
- Loews Westbury Hotel, Toronto, Ontario, Canada - now Courtyard by Marriott Toronto Downtown
- Hôtel Loews La Cité, Montreal, Quebec, Canada - now New Residence Hall, McGill University
- Hôtel Loews Vogue, Montreal, Quebec, Canada - now Vogue Hotel Montreal Downtown, Curio Collection by Hilton
- Loews Le Concorde, Quebec City, Quebec, Canada, 1970-2014 - now Hôtel Le Concorde Québec

=== Caribbean ===
- Loews Paradise Island Hotel & Villas, Paradise Island, Bahamas - now Atlantis Paradise Island
- Loews Harbour Cove, Paradise Island, Bahamas - now Warwick Paradise Island
- Loews Bermuda Beach Resort, St. George's, Bermuda - demolished 2008
- Loews Dominicana, Santo Domingo, Dominican Republic - now Dominican Fiesta Hotel Santo Domingo
- Americana of San Juan, San Juan, Puerto Rico - now Royal Sonesta San Juan

=== Europe ===
- Loews Biarritz Le Miramar, Biarritz, France - now Sofitel Biarritz Le Miramar Thalassa
- Loews La Napoule Hotel & Casino, Mandelieu-la-Napoule, France - now Pullman Cannes Mandelieu Royal Casino Hotel
- Loews Athens, Athens, Greece
- Loews Monte Carlo, Monte Carlo, Monaco, 1975-1998 - now Fairmont Monte Carlo
- Loews Marbella Beach, Marbella, Spain
- Loews Marbella Golf, Marbella, Spain
- Loews Frankfurt Hotel, Frankfurt, West Germany - now Frankfurt Marriott Hotel
- Loews Hamburg Plaza Hotel, Hamburg, West Germany - now Radisson Blu Hotel Hamburg
- Loews Churchill Hotel, London, UK - now Hyatt Regency London - The Churchill
- The Montcalm Hotel, London, UK
