= Wet 'n Wild Orlando =

Former water park in Orlando

- Interactive map of Wet 'n Wild Orlando
- Slogan: "The Recognized Name in Family Water Fun!"
- Location: Universal Orlando Resort, Orlando, Florida, United States
- Coordinates: 28.460943°N 81.464841°W
- Owner: NBCUniversal (Comcast)
- Opened: March 13, 1977; 49 years ago
- Closed: January 1, 2017; 9 years ago
- Previous names: Wet n' Wild FunPark
- Operating season: Open all year long (water heated in winter)
- Status: Defunct[[]]
- Area: 30 acres (120,000 m^{2})
- Pools: A single pool
- Water slides: 17 water slides

Wet 'n Wild Orlando was the flagship water park of Wet 'n Wild owned by NBCUniversal, located on International Drive in Orlando, Florida. It was founded by SeaWorld creator George Millay and opened on March 13, 1977. It closed on January 1, 2017.

== History ==
=== Development and ownership ===
While developing SeaWorld, George Millay realized the need for a water park, later recalling "being in Florida, with all its heat and hot sun, you naturally think about cooling off in water". In the mid-1970s, he directed his time and money towards the project. The idea stemmed from the splash pad at Ontario Place in Canada and the wave pool at Point Mallard Park in Alabama. His desire was to combine these two elements and build upon it in order to achieve a good return on investment. Due to his prior success with SeaWorld, he was able to form a team of investors to fund the project.

The park opened in Orlando, Florida on March 13, 1977. Although it opened to rain and suffered a $600,000 loss in its first year of operation, Millay kept it open. He later claimed it "started making money the second year and never looked back". The success of the park spawned several other Wet 'n Wild-branded parks across the Americas.

In 1998, Millay sold off his interests in his parks. The Orlando location was purchased by Universal Studios Recreation Group, who continued to lease the land on which it is located. In mid-2013, Universal purchased the 50 acres (20 ha) of land for $30.9 million.

=== Expansion and later years ===
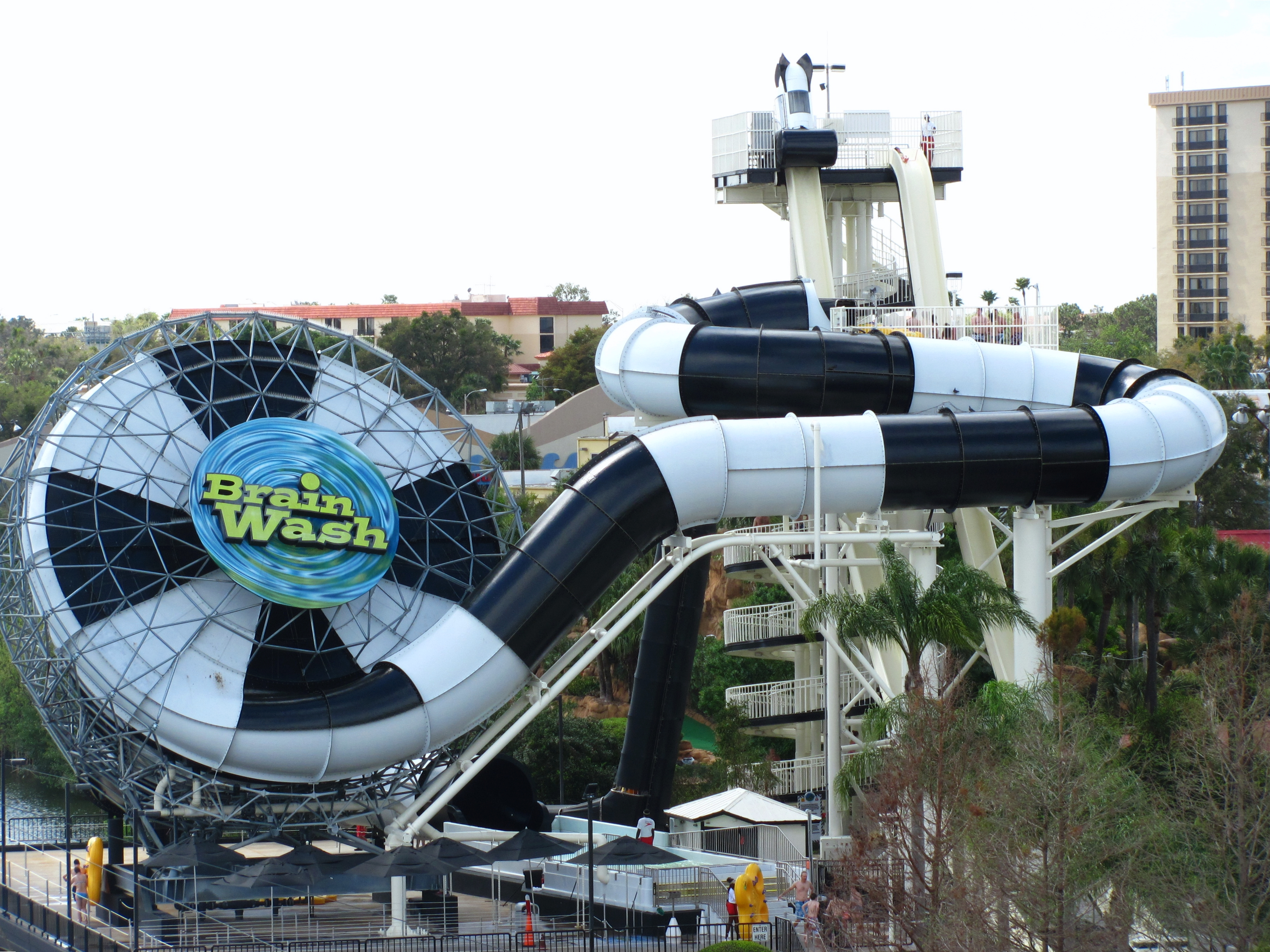
Brain Wash

In 1998, the Hydra Fighter was added to the park. Riders were able to control their suspended gondola through the use of high-powered water guns.

In 2000, the park renovated their Kids Park children's area. The original aviation theme was converted into a sandcastle theme. The renovation saw three ProSlide Technology "Kidz" slides added as well as a castle with a tipping bucket which dumped 250 US gallons (950 L; 210 imp gal) of water every three-and-a-half minutes. With the exception of the three slides, it was manufactured entirely by Integrity Attractions.

In 2001, the park began a multi-year expansion plan with Canadian manufacturer ProSlide Technology. It added The Storm, a pair of ProBowls, in 2001; The Blast, an inline tube slide, in 2003; Disco H2O, an enclosed Behemoth Bowl, in 2005; and Brain Wash, an enclosed Tornado, in 2008.

In 2011, the Kids Park was demolished and was replaced by Blastaway Beach, a larger children's water play area that opened in 2012, also themed around sandcastles.

In 2014, the Bubba Tub was removed and replaced with the Aqua Drag Racer, a four-lane race slide.

On June 17, 2015, it was confirmed that the park would close on December 31, 2016, to be replaced by a new water park, Universal Volcano Bay, which opened across the interstate I-4 adjacent to Universal's Cabana Bay Beach Resort on May 25, 2017. The park permanently closed on January 1, 2017, and was demolished in early 2017.

The former site of Wet N' Wild is currently occupied by Universal's Endless Summer Resort which opened in June 2019.

=== Attendance ===
The park was the most-attended water park in the United States until 1999, when Walt Disney World Resort's Typhoon Lagoon and Blizzard Beach surpassed it. At the time, it was averaging around 1.3 million visitors per year for several years.

== Attractions ==
=== Final attractions ===
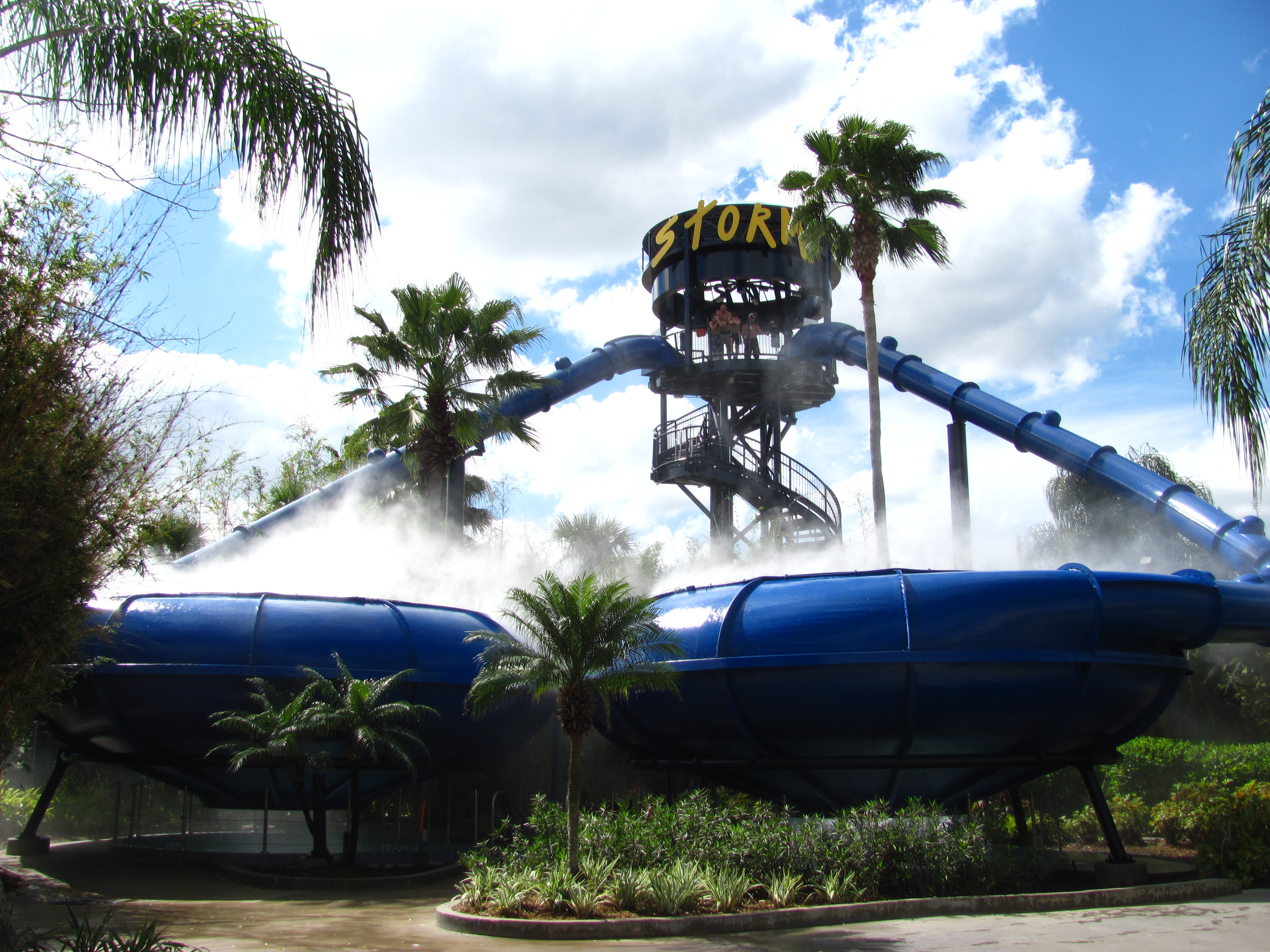
The Storm

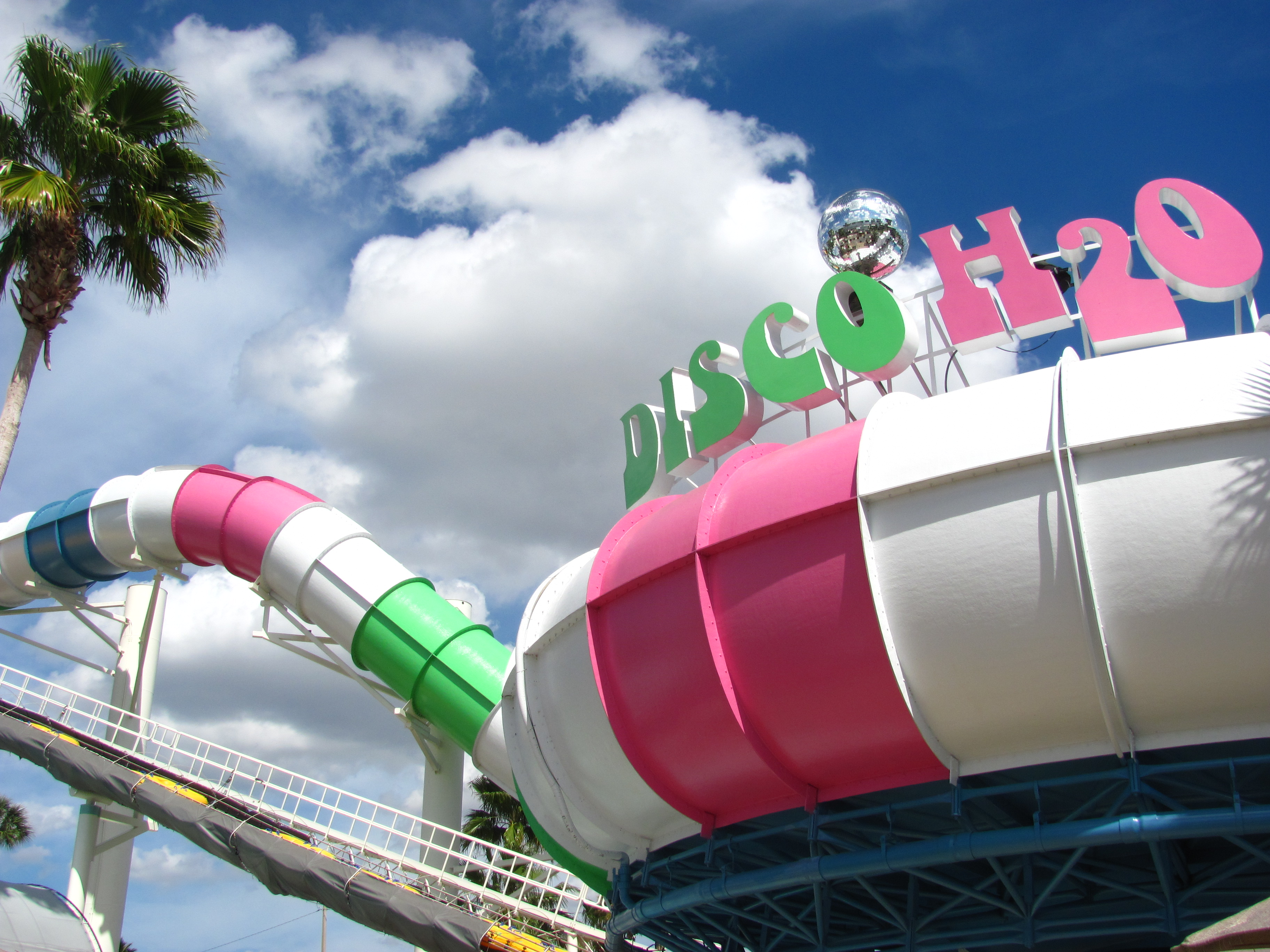
Disco H2O

| Name | Type | Manufacturer | Opened | Notes | Ref. |
|---|---|---|---|---|---|
| Aqua Drag Racer | Four racing mat slides | ProSlide | 2014 | Replaced the Bubba Tub. It only operated for two years when the park closed in 2016. | |
| Black Hole | Two enclosed inline tube slides | WhiteWater West | 1990 | Replaced the original Corkscrew | |
| Blastaway Beach | Children's area | ProSlide | 2012 | Replaced the Kids Park. | |
| The Blast | Inline tube slide | ProSlide | 2003 | Replaced Raging Rapids. | |
| The Bomb Bay | Freefall body slide | WhiteWater West (base slide)/Universal Creative (trapdoor) | 2001 | | |
| Brain Wash | Enclosed Tornado | ProSlide | 2008 | Replaced the Hydra Fighter and Hydra-Maniac/Blue Niagara. | |
| Der Stuka | Freefall body slide | WhiteWater West | 1984 | | |
| Disco H2O | Enclosed Behemoth Bowl | ProSlide | 2005 | | |
| The Flyer (originally Fuji Flyer) | Two inline tube slides | ProSlide | 1996 | Replaced the original Mach 5 Beta. | |
| Lazy River | Lazy river | Wet 'n Wild, Inc. | 1984 | | |
| Mach 5 | Three mat slides | Surf Coaster | 1986 | Formerly Mach 5 Alpha | |
| The Storm | ProBowls | ProSlide | 2001 | | |
| The Surge | Mammoth | ProSlide | 1994 | | |
| The Wake Zone | Water sports | Wet 'n Wild, Inc. | 1977 | | |
| Wave Pool Surf Lagoon | Wave pool | Wet 'n Wild, Inc. | 1977 | | |

=== Former attractions ===
| Name | Type | Manufacturer | Opened | Closed | Notes | Ref. |
|---|---|---|---|---|---|---|
| Banzai Boggan | Two sled slides | Bailey Rides, Inc. | 1977 | 1986 | Replaced by the Hydra Maniac | |
| Blue Niagara | Two enclosed corkscrew slides | Waterfun Products | 1988 | 2007 | Replaced by Brain Wash. | |
| Bubba Tub | Family Raft Slide | Waterworld Products | 1992 | 2014 | Replaced by the Aqua Drag Racer. | |
| Canadian Water Caper | Children's Area | Wet 'n Wild, Inc. | 1977 | 1992 | Replaced by the Kids's Park | |
| Corkscrew | Enclosed slide | Wet 'n Wild, Inc. | 1977 | 1990 | Replaced by The Black Hole | |
| Hydra Fighter | Suspended ride | Unknown | 1998 | 2007 | Replaced by Brain Wash. | |
| Hydra Maniac | Two enclosed slides | WhiteWater West | 1986 | 1994 | Replaced by the Surge | |
| Kamikaze | Freefall body slide | Wet 'n Wild, Inc. | 1979 | 1992 | Replaced by the Bubba Tub | |
| Kids Park | Children's area | Wet 'n Wild, Inc. | 1992 | 2000 | Replaced by the new one of the same name (now Blastaway Beach). | |
| Kids Park | Children's area | ProSlide, Integrity Attractions | 2000 | 2011 | Replaced the original one of the same name, closed and replaced by Blastaway Beach. | |
| Mach 5 Alpha | Two inline tube slides | Surf Coaster | 1986 | 1995 | Replaced by The Flyer. | |
| Raging Rapids | Inline tube slide | Wet 'n Wild, Inc. | 1982 | 2002 | Replaced by The Blast. | |
| Whitewater Slideways | Two open body slides | Wet 'n Wild, Inc. | 1977 | 1986 | Replaced by the Mach 5 | |

== In popular culture ==
The park was featured on Travel Channel's Extreme Waterparks and was also the setting for the music video for "Se a vida é", by the Pet Shop Boys.

The park was featured for Puerto Rican band Menudo for their video Nao Se Reprima in Portuguese.

== See also ==
- List of water parks
