= George Millay =

Founder of SeaWorld

- Millay in 1959
- Born: July 4, 1929; Mercy Hospital, San Diego, California, US
- Died: February 6, 2006 (aged 76); San Diego, California, US
- Education: UCLA
- Known for: Founder of SeaWorld and Wet 'n Wild Orlando, creator of the water park

George Millay (July 4, 1929 – February 6, 2006) was an American businessman and founder of SeaWorld and Wet 'n Wild water parks.

Millay was born July 4, 1929, at Mercy Hospital and grew up in Ocean Beach, San Francisco, and Hawaii. After serving three years in the Navy, he enrolled at UCLA. He graduated in 1955 and worked as a stockbroker.

In 1958, Millay and two partners who included David Tallichet, formed Speciality Restaurants Corporation, a destination-restaurant business. Their first location was a Polynesian-themed Reef in Long Beach. More than 100 restaurants across the U.S. followed, including the Proud Bird adjacent to Los Angeles International Airport, and 94th Aero Squadron near Van Nuys Airport.

After selling SRC to Tallichet, Millay envisioned creating an underwater zoo. Joining with two fraternity brothers and their former fraternity adviser, the group hoped to create an attraction to rival Marineland. SeaWorld opened in 1964 in San Diego, California. An orca named Shamu was added in 1965 and became one of its most successful attractions. Millay opened SeaWorld Ohio in 1970 and SeaWorld Orlando in 1973. He assisted in the development of Magic Mountain. In 1977, Millay developed the now-defunct Wet 'n Wild water park in Orlando, Florida.

== World Waterpark Association ==
Founded in 1982, World Waterpark Association was inspired by Millay‘s creativity and success. Based in Overland Park, Kansas, World Waterpark Association is led by a volunteer board of directors, a Governance Committee, and a paid staff of directors and managers. Annually, WWA hosts a conference and Trade Show to educate members and to showcase waterpark products and services. The organization publishes the trade publication World Waterpark Magazine.

By the time Millay sold his company in 1998, ten Wet 'n Wild parks were in operation. Millay was inducted into the International Association of Amusement Parks and Attractions (IAAPA) Hall of Fame in 1994. Ten years later, the World Waterpark Association gave him their first ever Lifetime Achievement Award and named him the official "Father of the Waterpark".

Millay died on February 6, 2006, at age 76 due to complications from lung cancer treatment in San Diego.
