= Universal Volcano Bay =

Amusement park in Orlando, Florida, United States

Volcano Bay

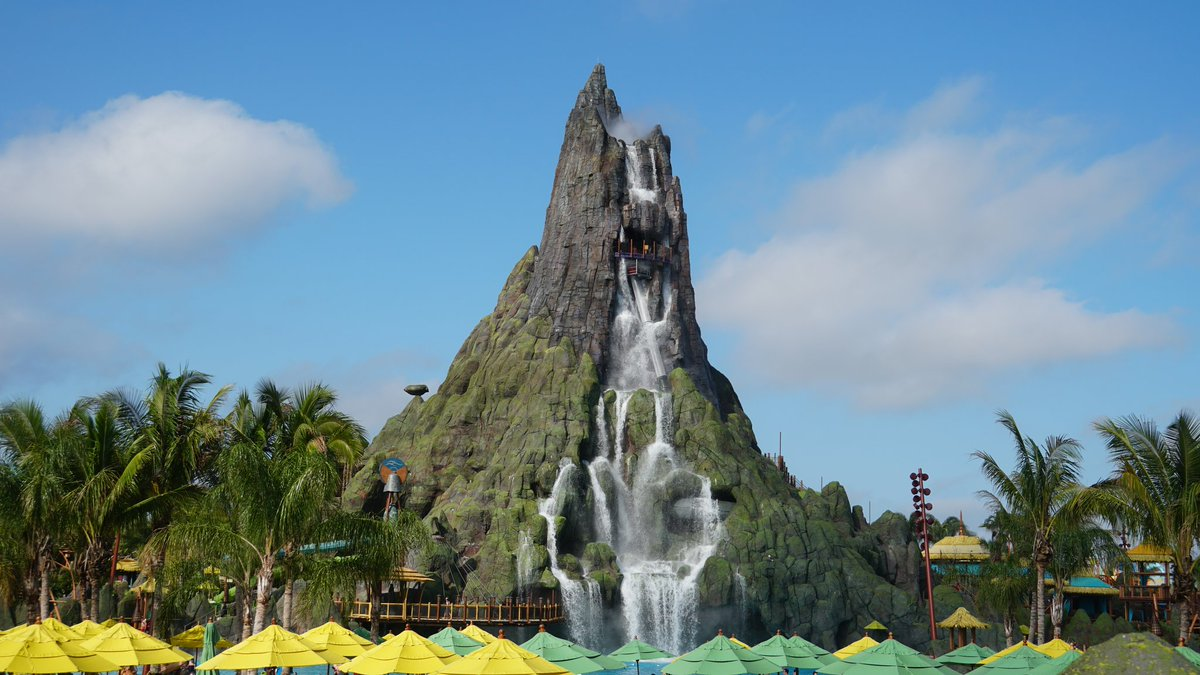
- Krakatau Volcano
- Interactive map of Volcano Bay
- Slogan: Water is life. Life is joy.
- Location: Universal Orlando Resort, Orlando, Florida, United States
- Coordinates: 28°27′41″N 81°28′23″W
- Theme: Polynesian culture
- Owner: NBCUniversal (Comcast)
- Operated by: Universal Destinations & Experiences
- Opened: May 25, 2017; 9 years ago
- Operating season: Open all year (water heated in winter)
- Status: Operating
- Area: 27 acres (11 ha)
- Website: Official website

Universal Volcano Bay, or simply Volcano Bay, is a tropical-themed water park at Universal Orlando Resort in Orlando, Florida. Owned by NBCUniversal (Comcast) and operated by Universal Destinations & Experiences, Volcano Bay replaced Wet 'n Wild as Universal Orlando Resort's only water park, the third theme park overall, and the first water park constructed by Universal Creative. The park opened on May 25, 2017.

At the center of the park is "Krakatau," a 200-foot-tall (61 m) volcano. Its slides include water coasters and capsule plunge slides. As the park's main icon, Krakatau is featured in the logo.

Volcano Bay was constructed on approximately 53 acres (21 ha) of the resort complex's overall property and cost an estimated US$600 million to build.

== History ==
In February 2015, Universal Orlando Resort officials submitted plans for a new water park attraction to be located on their property near the Cabana Bay Beach Resort. Construction was already underway when Universal Orlando Resort officially announced the project and its name on May 28, 2015. In June 2015, it was revealed that the park would replace the Universal-owned Wet 'n Wild water park, which closed on December 31, 2016.

Artist's concepts for the new water park included a wave pool, a thrill slide coming from the park's central volcano, and other water slides. A lazy river and rapids slide were also shown on the plans, although park officials stated they would reveal all of the park's planned attractions at a later date.

On June 21, 2016, Universal Orlando Resort officials revealed additional details on Volcano Bay, including its debut attractions and its planned opening date of June 1, 2017. On January 25, 2017, Universal Orlando Resort revealed that the Grand Opening of the park to the public would be on May 25, 2017.

Volcano Bay's first few months of operation were met with mixed reviews on social media sites such as Yelp and TripAdvisor, with visitors praising the park's appearance and theming, while criticizing the lines and the TapuTapu ride reservation system. Visitors complained about the long lines for the slides that could be reserved, which they say resulted in overcrowding in attractions that could not be reserved. However, other visitors noted that they had better experiences arriving well before opening or later in the day. A park spokesperson claimed that their internal surveys indicated guests were generally happy with the park.

On May 1, 2025, Universal Orlando Resort announced that the TapuTapu system and all of its functions will no longer be available starting on October 1, 2025, and that Volcano Bay would be closed for a five month extensive refurbishment starting in October 2026.

== Attractions ==
Volcano Bay's attractions are located in four themed areas, each inspired by various Polynesian islands and cultures. The centerpiece of the park is "Krakatau", (under the name of The Volcano), a 200-foot-tall (61 m) volcano that will have waterfalls during the day and lava flows at night created by the French company Aquatique Show.

=== The Volcano ===
The area located in the park's signature volcano also includes a first-of-its-kind slide attraction.

- Krakatau Aqua Coaster: A water coaster taking riders inside the heart of the Krakatau volcano, before plunging through a shimmering waterfall. It features linear induction motors to propel riders uphill.
- Ko’okiri Body Plunge: A near-vertical (70-degree drop) speed slide with a trap-door start, that passes through the Krakatau volcano, falling 125 feet (38 m) through one of the pool attractions at the base of the volcano. As the second tallest body slide in America. It is described by the park as a "world's-first" feature, and the first to travel through a pool full of guests. Along with the Kala and Tai Nui Serpentine Body Slides, the Ko'okiri Body Plunge is the second tallest drop capsule slide in the world. It is also the second tallest body slide in the world to send riders out of a drop capsule the entire height of the slide in one continuous descent.
- Kala and Tai Nui Serpentine Body Slides: A pair of high-speed twisting body slides with trap-door starts. Along with the Ko'okiri Body Plunge, Kala and Tai Nui Serpentine Body Slides are the second tallest drop capsule slides in the world at 125 feet, following Thrillagasgar and Junglejammer at 142 feet tall.
- Punga Racers: A four-lane racing body slides (formerly the attraction used mats).

=== Wave Village ===
Wave Village is designed for sunbathing and relaxation and includes one and two-story cabanas that can be rented by visitors.

- Waturi Beach: The park's main wave pool.
- The Reef: A calmer pool with fewer waves.
- Ohyah and Ohno Drop Slides: Body slides with tall drops into the splash pools.
- Puka Uli Lagoon: A pool intended for relaxation.

=== River Village ===
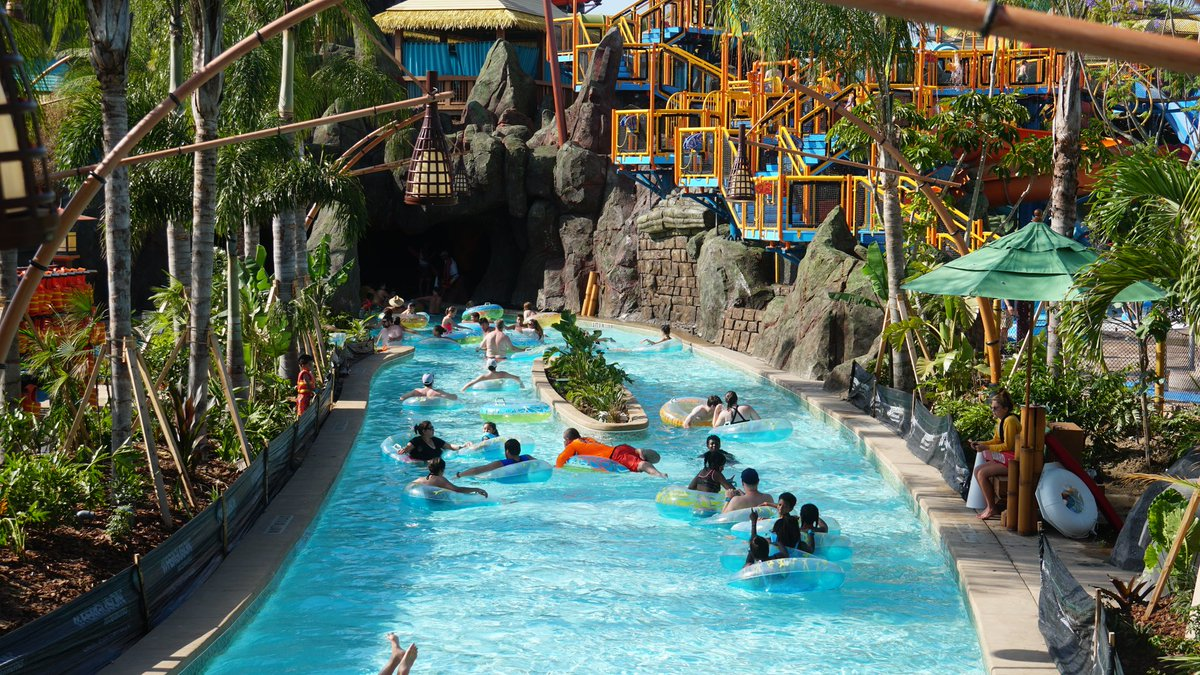
Kopiko Wai Winding River

The River Village area contains attractions for families and for younger visitors.

- Kopiko Wai Winding River: A lazy river that passes through Krakatau, with decorated caves and random special effects.
- Tot Tiki Reef: A play area designed for toddlers.
- Runamukka Reef: Three stories tall, a water fortress with its own small slides.
- Honu: One of two slides with multi-passenger rafts which sweeps riders up two massive walls.
- Ika Moana: A second multi-passenger raft slide.

=== Rainforest Village ===
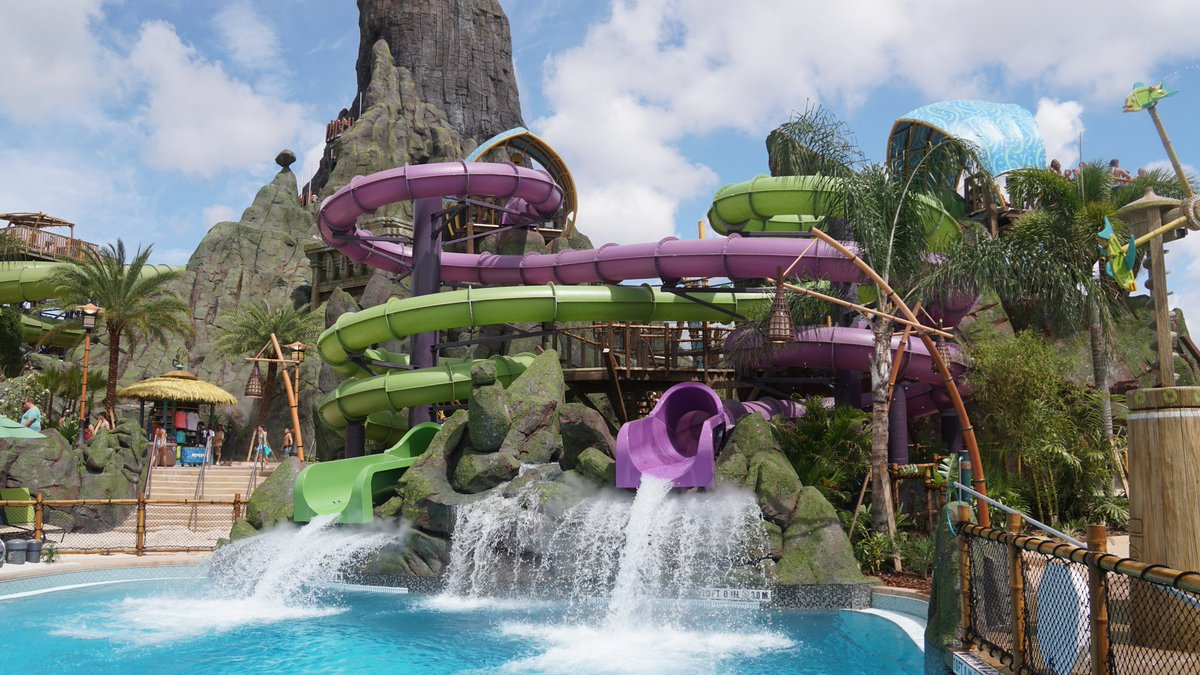
Ohyah and Ohno water slides

The final section of the park contains a large number of thrill slides, including raft slides ridden with multiple riders.

- Maku: Another multi-passenger raft slide, described as the first of its kind in North America with three high-banked "saucer" elements.
- Puihi: Multi-passenger rafts drop into multiple tunnels, then two funnels and a final drop.
- TeAwa The Fearless River: High-speed whitewater “torrent river”.
- Taniwha Tubes: Four raft slides ridden solo or in pairs.

== Attendance ==
Year	Attendance
2017	1,500,000
2018	1,725,000
2019	1,811,000
2020	551,000
2021	1,691,000
2022	1,850,000
2023	1,800,000
2024	1,650,000

== In popular culture ==
The park appeared in season 6, episode 23 of the truTV television show Impractical Jokers, “Take Me Out at the Ballgame”. Additionally, the park has also appeared in season 14 of Food Network's show Food Network Star, as well as Top Chef Junior season 1, episode 13.

== See also ==
- Incidents at Universal Volcano Bay
