= Harris Bank Addition II =

Office skyscraper in Chicago, Illinois

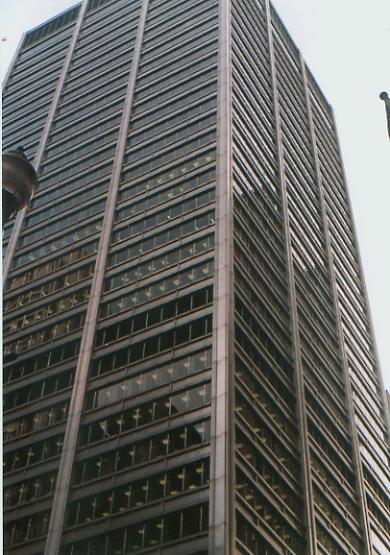
- Harris Bank Addition II
- Interactive map of the Harris Bank Addition II area

General information
- Type: Office
- Location: 115 South LaSalle Street, Chicago, Illinois
- Coordinates: 41.8804°N 87.6319°W
- Completed: 1974

Height
- Roof: 510 ft (160 m)

Technical details
- Floor count: 38
- Floor area: 65,032 m^{2} (700,000 sq ft)

Design and construction
- Architects: Skidmore, Owings & Merrill

Harris Bank Addition II is a 510 ft (160 m) tall skyscraper in Chicago, Illinois, United States. It was completed in 1974 and has 38 floors. Skidmore, Owings and Merrill designed the building in the International style which is the 83rd tallest in Chicago and has 592,000 sq ft (55,000 m^{2}) of floor space. It houses offices and a branch for BMO Harris Bank. The building is located at the southeast corner of Monroe and LaSalle Streets and is set back from the property line of Monroe Street to allow a small plaza and fountain.

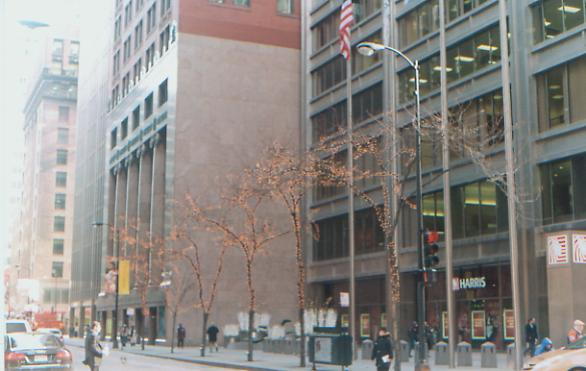
Monroe Street facade of the Harris Complex with Addition II in the foreground

The addition is part of the Harris Bank complex which consists of the original 20-story building constructed in 1911, a 23-story structure to the east constructed in 1958 and the 38-story tower to the west. The 1958 building was also designed by Skidmore, Owings and Merrill and both additions are faced with glass and stainless steel. The 1958 structure bears the address of 111 West Monroe Street and the 1910 building is at 119 West Monroe Street. Together, these two buildings contain 611,000 sq ft (56,800 m^{2}). All three buildings are connected on 15 floors allowing occupants to cross through the entire complex. The street levels of both additions are recessed to allow for a narrow pedestrian arcade. The second addition houses a Harris Bank branch on the street level while the first addition houses retail stores.

The 1910 building was designed by Shepley, Ruttan and Coolidge in the neoclassical style and is 285 ft (87 m) tall. The lower five floors are faced with pink granite while the upper floors are red brick. Two bas-relief sculptures of lions which were used in the bank's logo until a name change in 2011. Above the entrance are four granite columns which extend from the second to fifth floors. The original cornice was removed at an unknown date.

The entire complex is managed by CommonWealth Partners, Management Services.

As part of a deal to sell the James R. Thompson Center to Google, the state of Illinois received cash plus title to the Harris Bank II building. The structure's current owner, JRTC Holdings, will renovate the facility to suit the needs of the state offices currently located in the Thompson Center before they relocate.

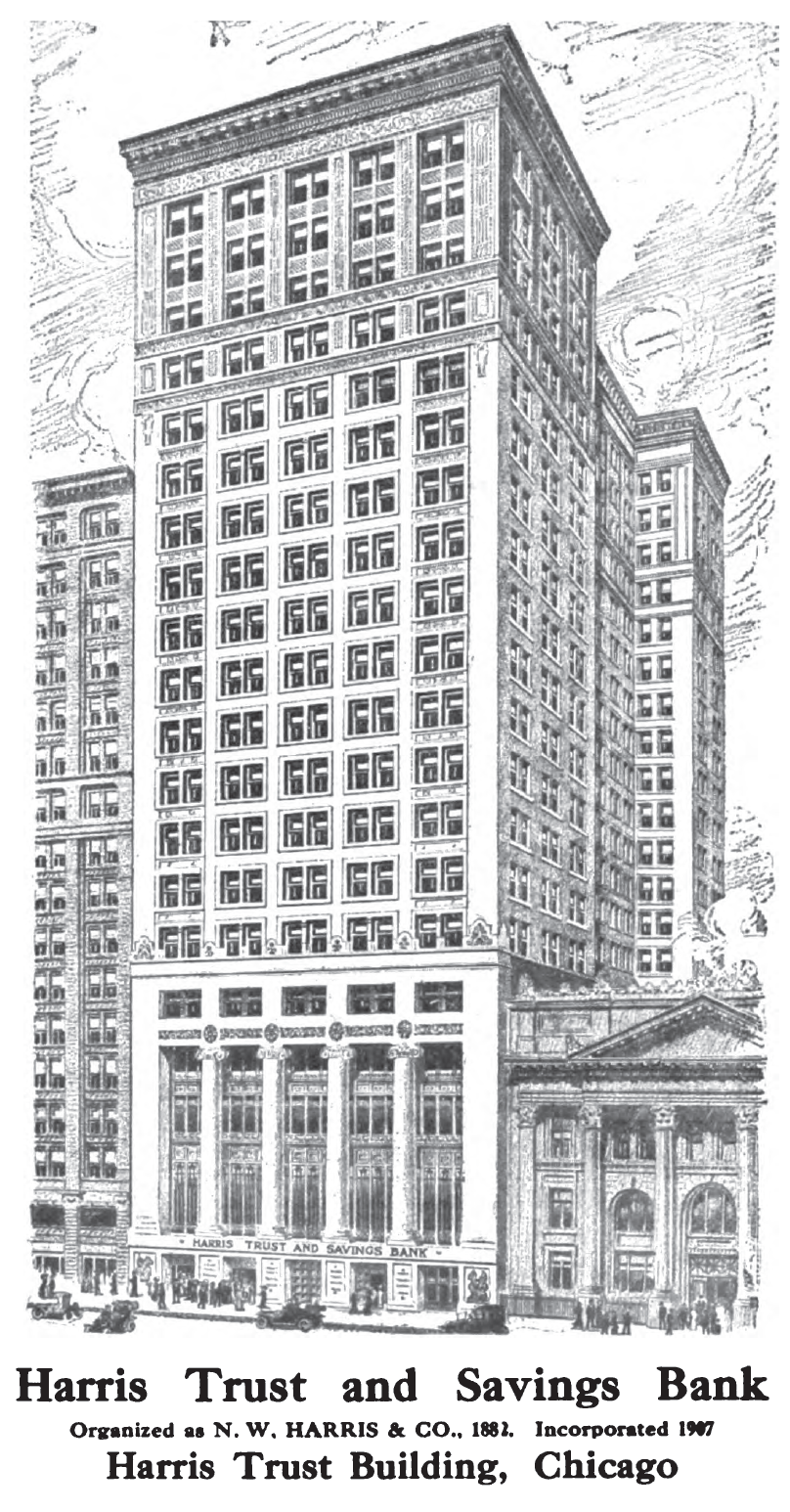
1910 Harris Trust Building

== See also ==
- List of tallest buildings in Chicago
