= Monument with Standing Beast =

Sculpture by Jean Dubuffet

Coordinates: 41.88475°N 87.63121°W

Monument With Standing Beast
- Artist: Jean Dubuffet
- Year: 1984
- Type: Fiberglass
- Dimensions: 8.8 m (29 ft)
- Location: James R. Thompson Center (outdoor), Chicago

Monument with Standing Beast is a sculpture by Jean Dubuffet previously located in front of the James R. Thompson Center in the Loop community area of Chicago, Illinois.

== History and description ==
It was across the street from Chicago City Hall to the South and diagonal across the street from the Daley Center to the southeast. Weighing 10 short tons (8.9 long tons; 9.1 t), the structure was made of fiberglass and was 29 feet (8.8 m) tall. It was unveiled on November 28, 1984. The state government announced plans to relocate the sculpture after Alphabet Inc. acquired the building in 2022. It was dismantled in the spring of 2024 and was bound for a state warehouse.

View facing northwest: James R. Thompson Center in the background

This is one of Dubuffet's three monumental sculpture commissions in the United States. It has been taken to represent a standing animal, a tree, a portal and an architectural form. The sculpture is based on Dubuffet's 1960 painting series Hourloupe. The sculpture and the series of figural and landscape designs it is a part of reflects his thoughts of earliest monumental commission, for the One Chase Manhattan Plaza.

The sculpture is one of 19 commissioned artworks funded under the State of Illinois Art-in-Architecture Program throughout the building. This was commissioned by the Capital Development Board of Illinois.

The sculpture is affectionately known to many Chicagoans as "Snoopy in a blender".

== See also ==
- List of public art in Chicago
- Group of Four Trees (1972)
- Plop art
