= James R. Thompson Center =

Office building in Chicago, Illinois

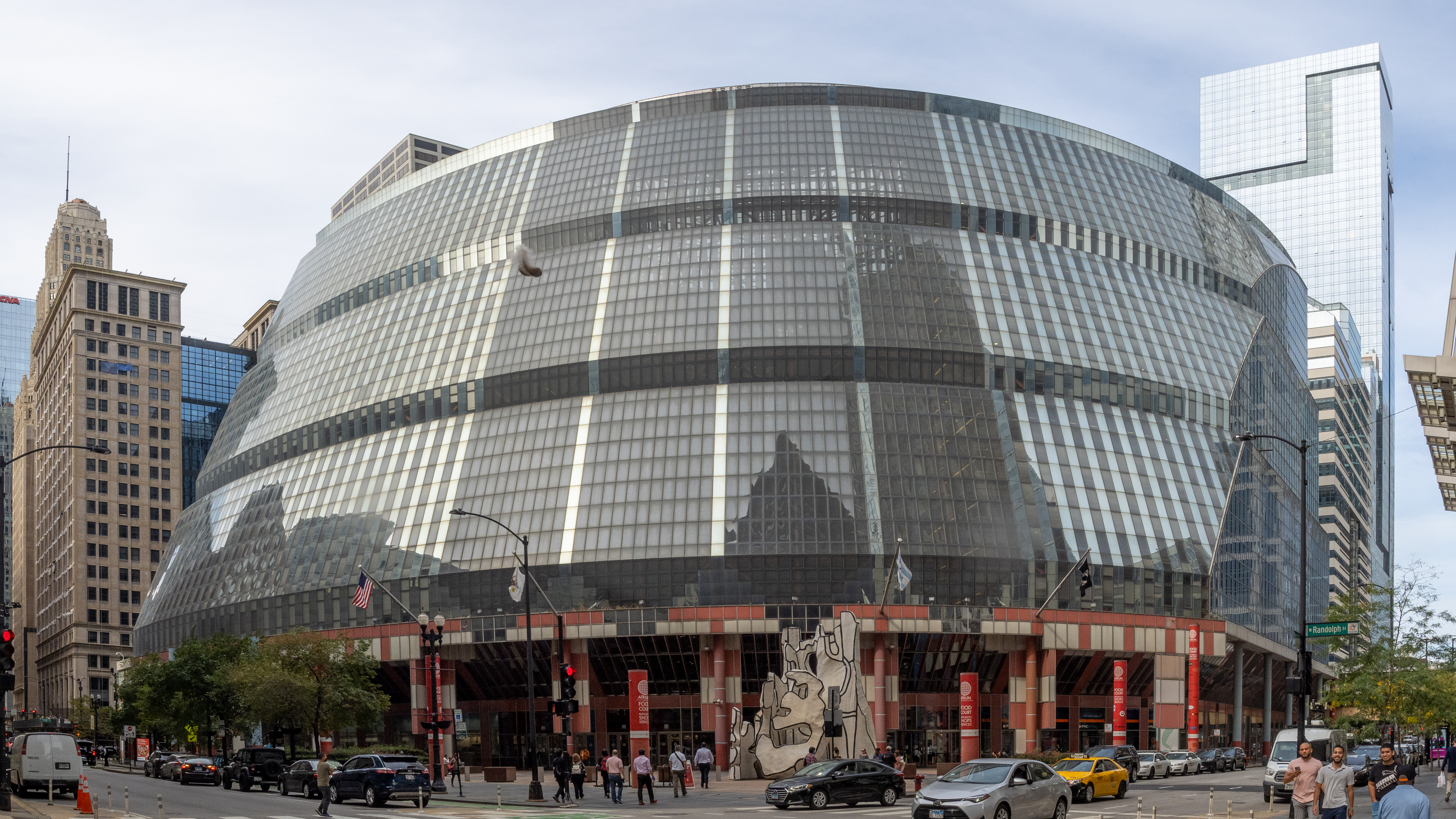
- Southeast elevation of the facade
- Former names: State of Illinois Center
- Alternative names: Thompson Center

General information
- Architectural style: Postmodern
- Location: Loop, Chicago, Illinois, United States
- Coordinates: 41°53′07″N 87°37′54″W
- Named for: James R. Thompson
- Construction started: 1981
- Topped-out: September 1, 1982
- Completed: Early 1986
- Opening: May 6, 1985
- Cost: $172 million (1985)
- Client: Illinois State Government; Google (2024)
- Owner: JRTC Holdings LLC (70%); State of Illinois (30%)

Technical details
- Floor count: 17

Design and construction
- Architect: Helmut Jahn

Other information
- Public transit: Blue Green Orange Pink Purple Brown at Clark/Lake

The James R. Thompson Center (being redeveloped as the Thompson Center and originally the State of Illinois Center) is a postmodern-style office building at 100 W. Randolph Street in the Loop district of Chicago, Illinois, United States. Designed by architect Helmut Jahn around a post-modernist rotunda, it was built to house offices of the Illinois state government in Chicago. The building occupies an entire block bounded by Randolph, Lake, Clark and LaSalle streets.

Prior to the development of the State of Illinois Center, many offices of the government of Illinois were housed at 160 North LaSalle Street. Governor James R. Thompson allocated funding for the State of Illinois Center in 1978, and Jahn was selected as the architect, announcing his plans in 1980. The building opened in 1985 after several delays and a construction accident that killed five people. It was renamed for Thompson in 1993. By the 2000s, the building was functionally outdated, prompting three successive governors to propose redeveloping or selling the building. The sale proposals elicited numerous objections from preservationists, who unsuccessfully tried to have it added to the National Register of Historic Places. Alphabet Inc., the parent company of Google, finally acquired the building in 2022 and began renovating it in 2024.

The 17-story building curves and slopes facing a plaza on the southeast corner of the property. The facade is made of glass, which was originally multicolored and single-paned; the panels were replaced with insulated glass during the 2020s. On the building's roof is a round sloped skylight, which covers the building's circular atrium. A large transparent glass extension running from the skylight down the sloped front of the building, allowed views of the surrounding skyscrapers from the rotunda. The Thompson Center's atrium overlooks all of the building's stories and originally had semi-circular balconies, with exposed stairs on three sides opposite the front, and a glass enclosed elevator column opposite the front. Office floors stretched back from the balconies to the end of the building, which extended in straight outline to the back corner property lines. The building included 19 specially commissioned artworks funded by the State of Illinois Art-in-Architecture Program, among them the Monument with Standing Beast sculpture by Jean Dubuffet. The building's unconventional design has attracted mixed reviews over the years.

== Site ==
The James R. Thompson Center occupies the entire block bounded by Randolph, Lake, Clark and LaSalle Streets, within the Chicago Loop in downtown Chicago, Illinois, United States. The location was previously the site of the Sherman House Hotel operated by Ernie Byfield. The hotel closed in 1973 and was demolished in 1980.

The Chicago "L"'s Clark/Lake station is housed between the Thompson Center and the 203 N. LaSalle building across the street. The building serves as the main entrance to the station, which is served by the Orange, Green, Blue, Pink, Purple and Brown lines, and it leads directly to the eastern end of the station. The building is linked to the Chicago Pedway, with pedestrian tunnels connecting to 203 North LaSalle Street, the Chicago Title and Trust Company, and the City Hall-County Building. When the Thompson Center was built, it was surrounded by taller skyscrapers. The Thompson Center's architecture contrasted with that of nearby buildings, which tended to be rectangular and made of stone.

== History ==
=== Development ===
Prior to the development of the State of Illinois Center, many offices of the government of Illinois were housed at 160 North LaSalle Street. That building was insufficient for the state government's needs, so the state also had to rent space in numerous buildings, paying about $2 million a year.

==== Planning ====
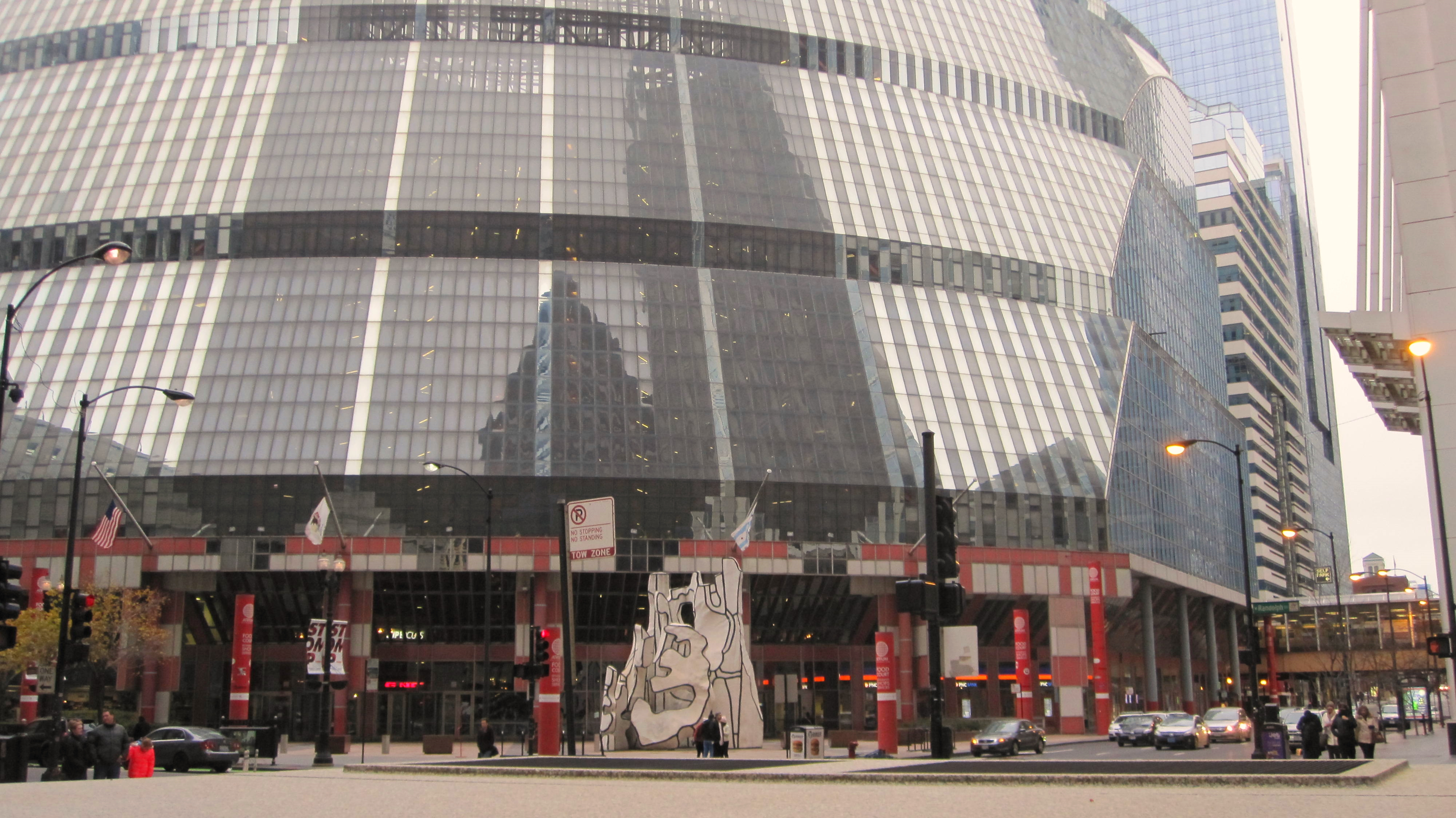
The base of the facade

Governor Dan Walker initially wanted to build a replacement building on the south end of the Loop. When Walker lost re-nomination in 1976, the developer Arthur Rubloff, one supporter of Thompson (who was ultimately elected in that election), suggested constructing the building at the north end of the Loop instead. After studying various sites for 27 months, a state agency selected the Sherman House site on March 29, 1978. That August, Thompson signed a bill to allocate $15 million for a new state-government office building on the site of the Sherman House. This move followed a failed attempt earlier that year by the Illinois General Assembly, the state's legislature, to allocate $11 million for the project; the legislature had provided only $2.5 million. At the time, Thompson considered the old LaSalle Street building to be very energy-efficient. Another $12 million for the State of Illinois Center's development was allocated in August 1979.

The building was initially expected to cost $85 million. Local architect Helmut Jahn was hired to design the State of Illinois Center, beating out seven other architects. Jahn called the project a great opportunity, saying that the limited number of stakeholders and the building's full block site gave him a large amount of flexibility with the design. In particular, the fact that the building's sole tenant was the Illinois government meant that they were "less likely to have their egos involved in a project the way [a private] owner is", according to Jahn. He presented three proposals to Thompson in 1979; two proposals were for more typical designs, while the other had an unusual curved, inclined facade. Thompson decided to go with the less conventional design, saying it "had presence" and signified a forward-looking mentality.

Jahn announced his plans in February 1980, and a model of the proposed structure was unveiled at the same time. By then, the building was to cost $115 million and accommodate 4,200 staff of 54 state agencies (Note: Other sources cite a figure of 53 agencies.) after its expected completion in 1983. The construction cost included around $90 million for constructing the building itself, as well as $25 million for furnishings. At the time, the building was intended to contain 1 million square feet (93,000 m^{2}) of offices, 150 thousand square feet (14,000 m^{2}) of commercial space, a rotunda, and a glass facade. Vickrey, Ovresat, Awwumb, Inc. were hired as the interior architect. The demolition of the Sherman House and several nearby buildings began that year.

==== Construction ====
When the building's construction was announced, Thompson pledged to hire a large number of minority business enterprises for the project, and a review board was convened to ensure that the project was hiring minority contractors. By early 1981, the site was being excavated. The general construction contract was awarded to a joint venture of Newberg Construction and Paschen Contractors in May 1981. The project was delayed because not enough contractors had submitted bids to build the structure's exterior curtain wall; contractors were reluctant to bid on the panels, which were required to be both curved and resistant to leakage. State officials considered awarding the curtain-wall contract to a foreign firm, but the contract was eventually awarded to an American company, H. H. Robertson Co., that September. Work was also delayed due to a labor strike that year, and water accumulated in the foundation during the strike, forcing workers to pump out the water. The cost of the building had increased to $150 million by late 1981, making it the most expensive state-funded building ever built in Illinois, while the opening date had been pushed back to mid-1984.

On December 11, 1981, five workers were killed when a steel cage at the construction site plummeted to the ground. Preliminary investigations found that the cage suffered from metal fatigue. This accident did not delay construction of the building. Construction of the foundation was completed by March 1982, and the steel frame had reached the sixth floor by the next month. The project was not hindered by rain, and since the frame used little concrete, there was no need for workers to wait for warmer weather before pouring concrete. While the project had caused part of LaSalle Street to sag, workers planned to repair the road. Meanwhile, several Chicago artists had asked the French sculptor Jean Dubuffet to create a sculpture for the State of Illinois Center. By early 1982, Dubuffet had agreed to construct a sculpture for $750,000. The steel frame topped out on September 1, 1982, at which point the construction cost had increased to $172 million. Other estimates in 1983–1984 put the cost at around $118 million.

State officials revised the plans in 1983 to save about $9 million. Nonetheless, the cost had risen further to $176.2 million by 1984, making it the costliest governmental building ever built in Illinois. Due to budget overruns, the state government substituted the facade's double-paned glass panels with single-paned glass, and they considered canceling a proposed art gallery inside the building. The state saved money by canceling earlier plans to install hundreds of doors. Kitchenettes and padded floors were omitted from the plans, and the offices were outfitted with secondhand furniture rather than new furnishings. To comply with a state law mandating that part of the construction cost be used for artwork, the state government commissioned 19 artists to design $367,000 worth of art for the building.

==== Completion ====
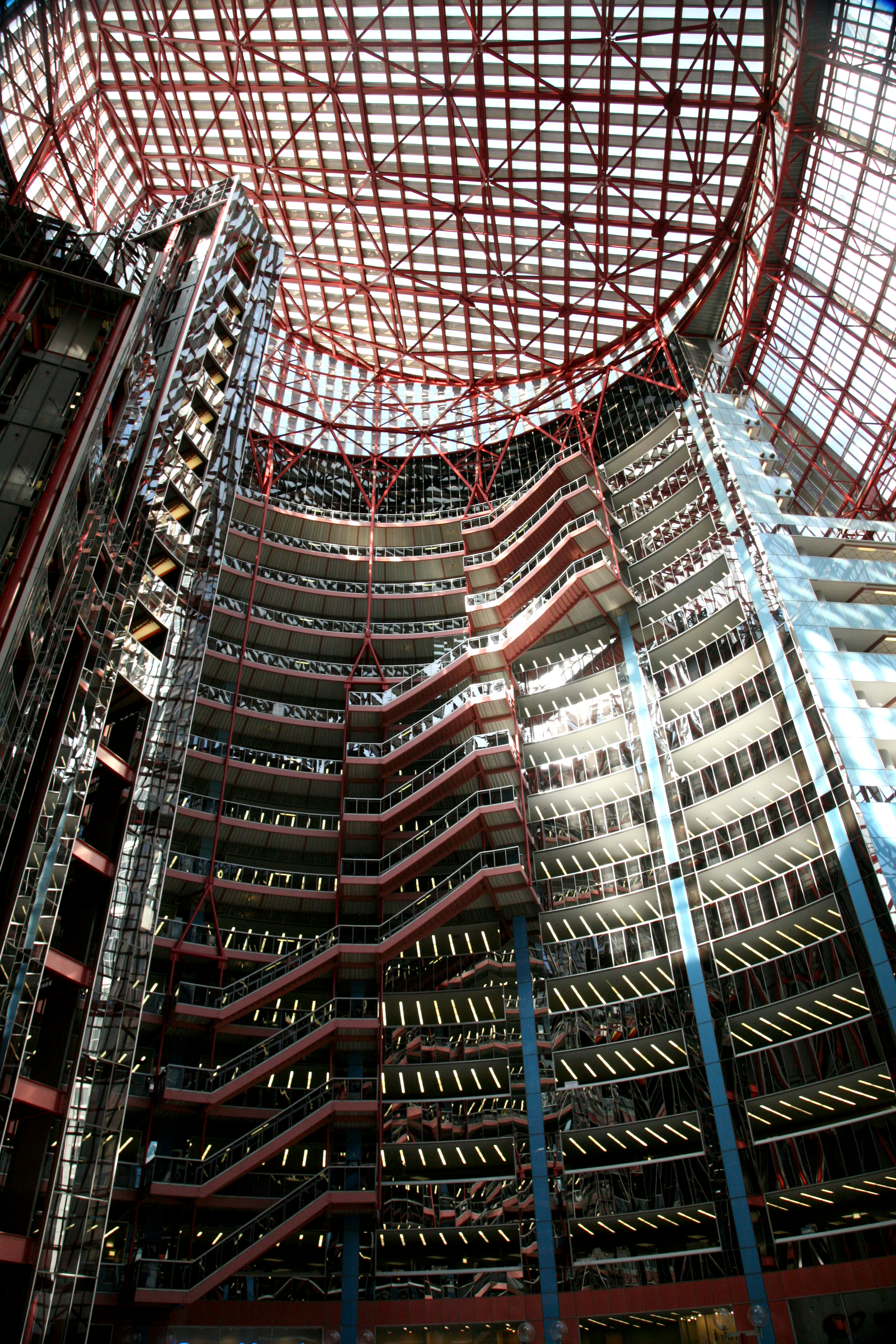
The skylight at the top of the building's atrium

State Building Venture was selected to operate a mall on three of the lower stories; rent from the mall was expected to produce $14 million in revenue for the building over its first 15 years. By February 1984, the building's mall was 80% leased. That June, Mayor Harold Washington requested that the Chicago City Council exempt State Building Venture from having to acquire a building permit for the mall. City council members expressed concerns that the shopping mall did not meet building codes and that the emergency systems were inadequate. In addition, the Illinois Attorney General's office said that the building's floors could not support the weight of the office's law library, requiring up to $150,000 in reinforcement work.

The incomplete building was briefly opened to the public when Dubuffet's Monument with Standing Beast sculpture was dedicated outside the building in November 1984. Employees began moving into the State of Illinois Center near the end of that year, including the governor himself, who alternately worked in Chicago and the state capital of Springfield. Thompson first invited visitors to his new office at the building in February 1985, and two-thirds of the building's employees had moved in by April 1985. The same month, firefighters were stationed outside the new building after the city government filed a lawsuit alleging that the building was unsafe for occupancy. The final cost of the building totaled $172 million, nearly twice the original cost estimate, which later prompted an investigation from state auditors.

=== Opening and early years ===
When it was completed, the State of Illinois Center became the main building for the Illinois government in Chicago, complementing offices in Springfield. Various state government offices (such as those of the Governor, Attorney General, and Secretary of State) were housed in the Thompson Center. Other state departments and commissions had offices in the building as well, and it was a frequent site for public hearings and press conferences, among other government-related events. Other tenants included small and large businesses, as well as art galleries operated by the Illinois government. The structure was also one of the few places in Chicago where members of the public did not need to obtain a permit to protest.

==== 1980s ====
The State of Illinois Center opened on May 6, 1985; the opening ceremony alone cost $100,000, sparking criticism. At the time, some parts of the building were incomplete. Initially, the building was closed on weekends, but it received hundreds of visitors, including architects from around the world, on days it was open. The state government also created the Illinois Division of Security Police, assigning 35 officers to guard the building. The Illinois Artisans Shop opened within the building in December 1985. The structure was not finished until early 1986, and control of the building was transferred to the Illinois Department of Central Management Services (CMS) before it was completed.

While some employees liked the views from the building, others complained about the open plan and glassy surfaces. From the start, there were complaints about the building's air-conditioning and heating systems, with interior temperatures reaching 110 °F (43 °C) during the summer. The elevators made excessive noise, forcing the state of Illinois to install sound-dampening panels around the elevators. There were also complaints about rat infestations and leaks, and glare from sunlight often made it difficult to see computer screens, forcing some workers to use umbrellas indoors. Within a year of construction, the building's electricity use exceeded initial projections by 35%. The state government added Venetian blinds in an attempt to reduce glare and save energy. State auditors published a report in early 1986, saying that the state's Capital Development Board had known as early as 1979 that the building would cost about $150 million, and that the state had failed to properly monitor contractors' work. The auditors also found that confusion had arisen due to changes in the project's command hierarchy and the building's management.

By 1986, the state was upgrading the heating and cooling systems; the cost of the upgrade was estimated at $20 million. As such, state officials considered suing the building's engineers, and Illinois Attorney General Neil Hartigan sued several companies involved in the building's construction in April 1987 for $20 million. Jahn filed a countersuit, saying the issues were not because of the design. Additionally, in the late 1980s, a tunnel was constructed between the State of Illinois Center and the neighboring City Hall as part of the Chicago Pedway. Due to a lack of coordination between city and state agencies, the two sections of the tunnel were misaligned, requiring hundreds of thousands of dollars in repairs; the tunnel eventually opened in December 1989. By the late 1980s, the building had more than two million annual visitors, and the atrium was used for private events during nights and weekends.

==== 1990s ====
By 1992, the building's art gallery was in danger of closing permanently due to state budget cuts. At the time, the gallery had hosted work from 700 Illinois artists over the previous seven years, receiving about 33,000 annual visitors. The gallery ultimately remained open after receiving large private donations. The building was renamed on May 10, 1993, to honor former governor Thompson. The Illinois General Assembly had approved the renaming at the request of Thompson's onetime lieutenant governor, George Ryan, who had suggested Thompson as a namesake because "I don't know anybody else who wants that building named after him". The building remained a popular meeting spot for the public.

Hartigan's 1987 lawsuit against the building's contractors and architects was not settled until 1994, when several of the defendants agreed to pay Hartigan's successor, Roland Burris, a $5.7 million settlement. By the mid-1990s, Marriott International was operating a food court in the building's basement. The building also suffered from a leaky roof, to the extent that seven buckets were needed to catch water even on sunny days. The General Assembly did not authorize funding to repair the roof until 1998. A man rammed his car into the atrium of the Thompson Center in June 1999; though no one was injured, the incident raised security concerns. At the time, the building was surrounded only by granite bollards that were easy to navigate around, since the design was intended to invite the public in, and there were no metal detectors or other security measures.

=== Early 21st century ===
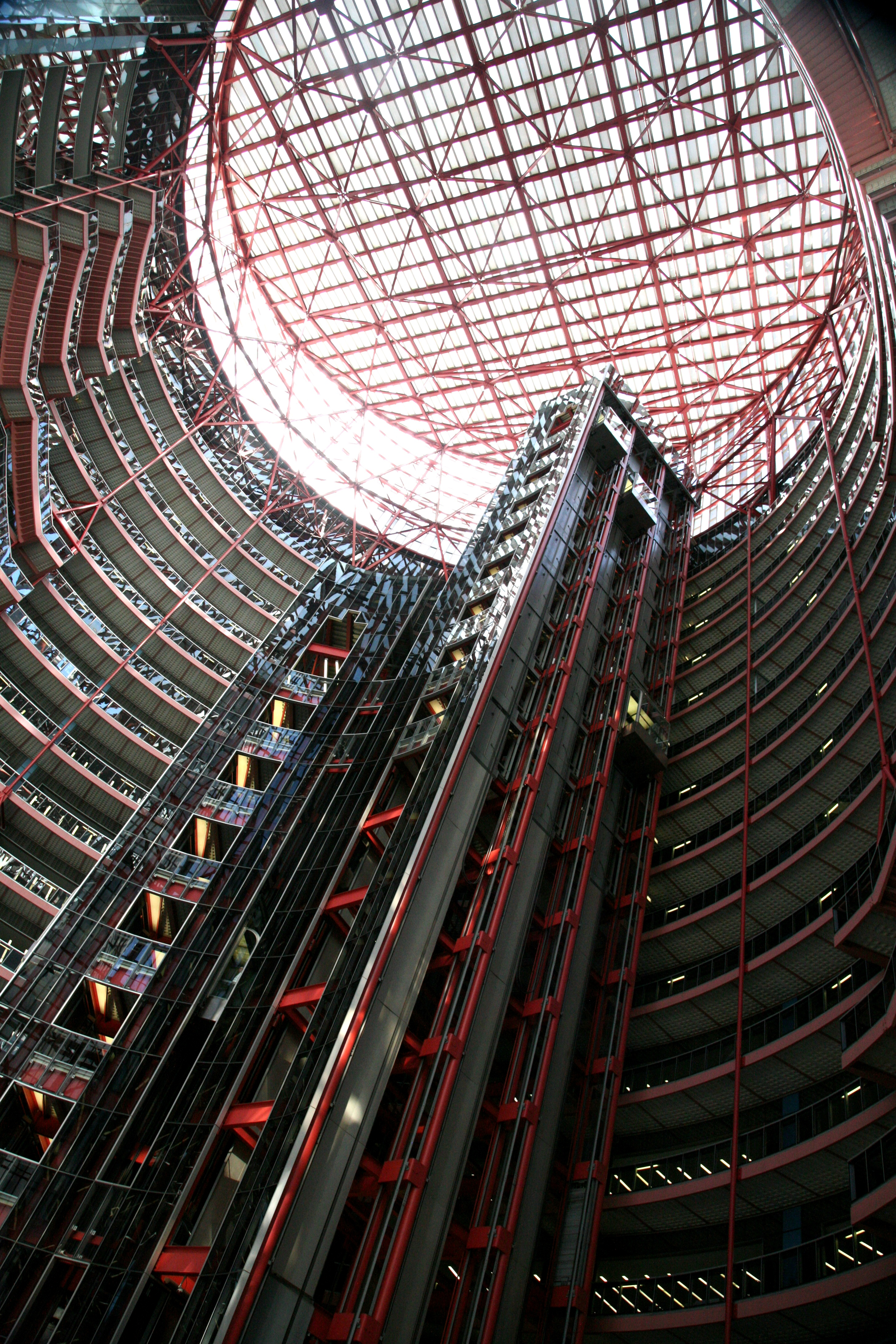
Interior of the atrium, looking toward the elevators

By the 21st century, the building remained difficult to maintain, and occupants complained about the climate control system and the open plan design. The state government had to spend $17 million annually just on maintenance, and by the 2010s, the state estimated that it would cost about $325 million to fix up the building. This included $60–80 million just for HVAC upgrades. The concrete pillars cracked due to improper drainage, and parts of the facade began to fall off, prompting officials to add scaffolding around the building. The poor soundproofing meant that sounds from the atrium spread to the offices as well. There were also reports of pest infestations, and Jahn claimed that the state had neglected the building on purpose.

==== Early 2000s: First sale proposal ====
Despite citywide restrictions on public indoor smoking, the activity was allowed on five floors of the Thompson Center until July 2000, when the state banned smoking after receiving multiple complaints. The state government requested an audit of State Building Venture, which managed the building's storefronts, the same year State Building Venture reported that it had not profited on the retail space in 13 of its first 15 years. Following the September 11 attacks in 2001, the Thompson Center was temporarily closed as a safety precaution, and the state hired a private security force to supplement the police officers already patrolling the building,

In April 2003, Illinois Governor Rod Blagojevich proposed selling the Thompson Center to help balance the state budget. Blagojevich claimed that the plan, which was to involve having the state lease back the building, would have raised at least $230 million for the state. The Illinois General Assembly initially agreed to allow such a sale; the plan was mainly endorsed by Democratic legislators, while most Republican lawmakers voted against it. Critics said the sale would provide only a onetime cash infusion and was not a reliable source of funding. The building had still not been sold by the end of 2003. Though the Hammond Times stated that several groups had expressed interest in buying the Thompson Center, The New York Times said that no offers had come in. The presence of the atrium, which reduced the amount of usable space in the building, was described as a deterrent to potential buyers.

In February 2004, Blagojevich's administration proposed taking out a $200 million, ten-year mortgage on the building to reduce the state's deficit. After State Senator Peter Roskam asked for the plan to be reviewed, Illinois Attorney General Lisa Madigan declared it unconstitutional in June 2004. This would have required Blagojevich to seek approval from a 60% supermajority of legislators, an option he was not willing to take. The plan, which was canceled that month after the state missed a deadline for taking out the mortgage, cost the state $532,000 in legal fees.

==== Mid-2000s to early 2010s ====
The Illinois State Police began patrolling the building in late 2004, replacing the building's private security force and saving $550,000 annually. In addition, metal detectors and armed guards were stationed at the entrances. A large granite slab fell off the Clark Street elevation of the facade in August 2009, and a subsequent investigation found that several other panels were in danger of falling off the facade. As a result, the state decided to remove the remaining granite panels from the facade that October. The steel beams supporting the panels were found to be corroded and were removed from the building in October 2010 for $294,000. To raise money, in 2014, the Chicagoland Chamber of Commerce proposed constructing a casino in the Thompson Center; had this proposal been carried out, the state offices would have been relocated. The same year, the building was decontaminated after an employee brought in bedbugs.

By the mid-2010s, the building was deteriorating, leading former governor Thompson to label it as a "scrap heap". Though the atrium was often busy, there were still complaints about its design. The building was characterized as having chipped paint and tattered carpets, and the sculpture outside had been graffitied. Thompson blamed Pat Quinn, the previous governor, for allowing the building to deteriorate so badly. Jahn, for his part, suggested that the building be preserved and converted into a commercial structure. Several real-estate developers sent inquiries about the building to Jahn's architectural practice, leading Jahn and his partners to conduct a study of their own. There were also suggestions to redevelop the building as part of Chicago's 2010s bid to host Amazon.com's second headquarters, Amazon HQ2.

==== 2010s and 2020s sale proposals ====
In October 2015, Governor Bruce Rauner proposed selling the property. In contrast to Blagojevich's previous proposal, multiple Republicans supported Rauner's proposal, and the leader of the Illinois House of Representatives' Republican minority, Jim Durkin, filed legislation to allow the sale to be expedited. This sale would have involved auctioning off the building and possibly demolishing it; the site's zoning allowed a building that was 60% larger, with up to 1.8 million square feet (170,000 m^{2}). Rauner said at the time that the building needed $100 million in repairs and that constructing a new building would instead save the state $12 million or $20 million per year. He also stated that the maintenance cost of the Thompson Center was three times higher than for similar office space in the Chicago Loop. Delays in the sale led Rauner to accuse Illinois House speaker Mike Madigan of holding up the sale in early 2017, a charge that Madigan denied.

Adrian Smith + Gordon Gill Architecture proposed a 1,700-foot (520 m), 115-story supertall skyscraper on the site in January 2017. They also prepared alternate plans for 40-, 60-, and 70-story structures. These proposals all required that the site be rezoned, which the city was unwilling to agree to. Jahn presented a counter-proposal that involved constructing an adjacent 110-story tower and keeping the existing building. Chicago Mayor Rahm Emanuel said he would not support the proposal unless it involved upgrades to the Clark/Lake station. The redevelopment proposal—one of several plans to demolish or significantly modify postmodern American buildings, such as 550 Madison Avenue in New York—prompted Landmarks Illinois to list the building as one of Illinois's most endangered sites several times. Preservationists also asked the city to designate the building as a local landmark. In May 2017, Republican state legislators proposed allocating revenue from the building's sale to Chicago Public Schools, a plan Emanuel rejected. Emanuel offered to rezone the site—allowing the state to seek a higher sale price of up to $300 million—if Rauner signed a pension-related bill, to which the governor refused. The same month, the state House voted to allow the building's sale without rezoning it.

Rauner's successor J. B. Pritzker postponed the sale in late 2018, as his administration no longer believed the building could sell for $300 million. A bill to sell the Thompson Center was sent to Pritzker in February 2019. That April, Pritzker signed a bill to begin the sale of the Thompson Center, with a proposed three-year timeline to find a buyer. The legislation sparked activism from preservationists and architects, and local group Preservation Futures nominated the structure for inclusion on the National Register of Historic Places (NRHP). The Illinois State Historic Preservation Office said that the building did not meet the criteria for NRHP listing, but the Illinois Historic Sites Advisory Council recommended NRHP designation anyway. The Chicago Architecture Center and Chicago Architectural Club sponsored an architectural design competition for a potential adaptive reuse of the building; the three winning entries suggested converting the building into a water park, a school, or a vertical city.

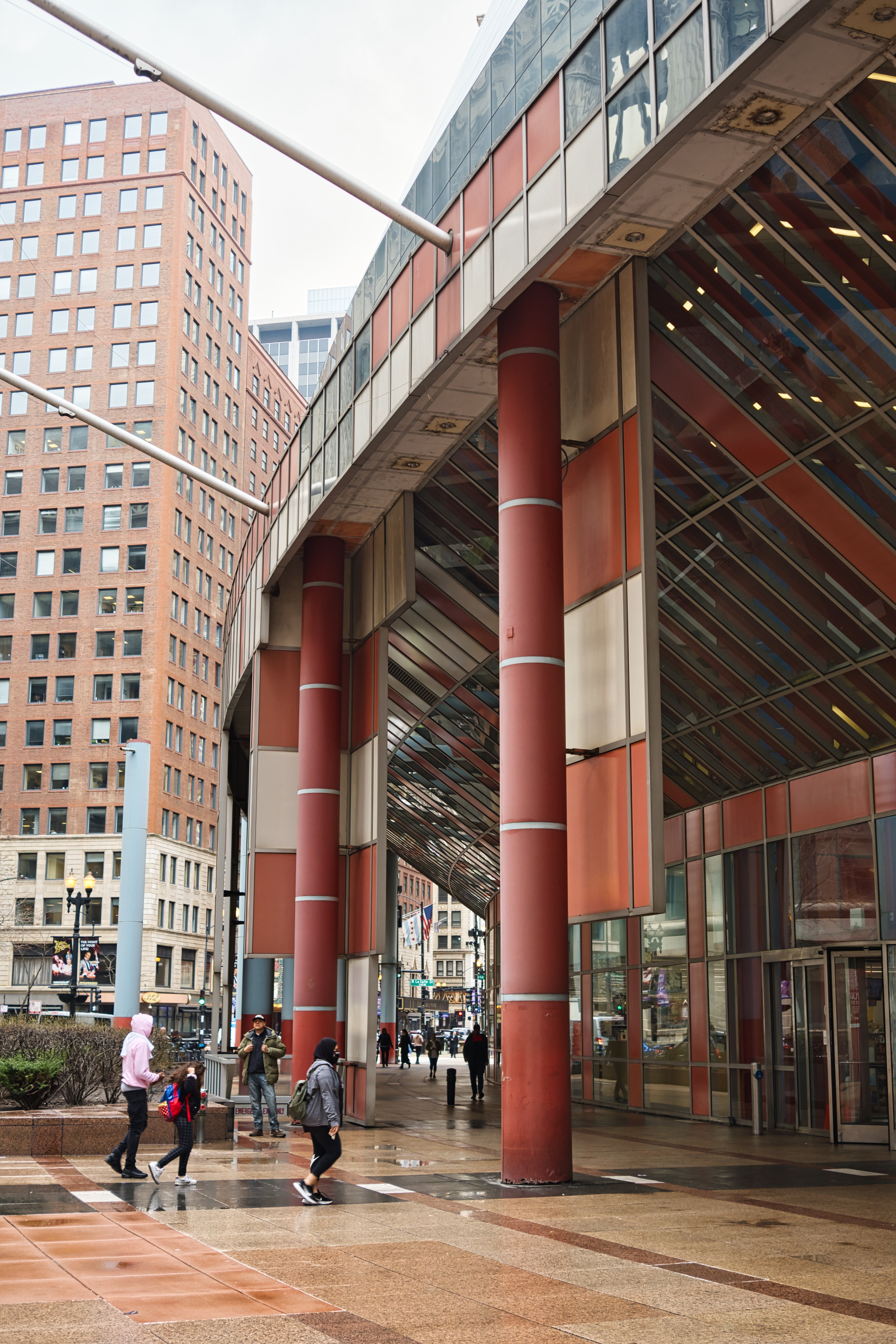
The building in 2022, just before redevelopment

The Illinois CMS announced in August 2019 that it would issue a request for proposals (RFP) to sell the headquarters, and Pritzker's administration indicated it was willing to operate the building as a public–private partnership. The CMS hired Ernst & Young that December to help market the building, intending to have a buyer within a year. The sale was delayed due to the COVID-19 pandemic, and the CMS also neglected to mention in its RFP that the building was being considered for NRHP status, which would qualify the building for federal tax credits. State workers began moving out of the building in January 2021, after the Illinois government bought another structure at 115 South LaSalle Street. Chicago's aldermen approved a zoning change for the building in May 2021, and Pritzker began requesting bids for the building that month. After postponing an August deadline for the bidding process by two months, Pritzker ultimately received two bids.

=== Alphabet ownership and renovation ===
Pritzker announced an agreement in December 2021 to sell the building to JRTC Holdings, a firm led by Prime/Capri Interests. Further details were announced in early 2022, in which the Illinois government would receive $70 million as a down payment. The state would also repurchase about a third of the office space, or around 425,000 square feet (39,500 m^{2}), for $148 million. In exchange, JRTC was to renovate the building. This plan was changed after one of the buyers, Quintin Primo, connected with a friend who told him that Google was looking to expand its offices in Chicago. In July 2022, Pritzker announced a revised deal in which Google's parent company Alphabet Inc. would acquire the building for $105 million after renovating it. Of this amount, $30 million would be a cash payment, while the other $75 million would be used to purchase 115 South LaSalle Street. Unlike the previous plan, this revised proposal would involve selling the entirety of the Thompson Center. The sale announcement prompted concern over how much of the design would be retained.

In 2023, the National Park Service rejected the application to list the building on the NRHP, citing opposition from Alphabet. Google received a permit that November to begin deconstructing portions of the atrium and facade. The next month, Google released renderings of the redesigned facade, while promising that the central atrium would be retained in the redesign. Google indicated that it would convert the building into a third place–style space for meetings. A renovation of the Thompson Center began in May 2024, and renderings of the redesigned atrium were released that November. Evan Jahn, the son of Helmut Jahn, was hired to oversee the renovation, and Prime/Capri Interests was retained to conduct the renovation. Initially, Google planned to move into the building in 2026 and anticipated that the project would cost $280 million. It was also originally planned to be the building's only tenant.

By early 2025, Google planned to occupy the third to ninth stories and was seeking tenants for the upper floors. Installation of glass panels was underway by that July, at which point the building was scheduled to be ready for use in 2027. Once completed, the building was planned to receive a LEED Platinum green building certification. News media said that the building's redevelopment could potentially attract businesses to the Loop. A new glass cladding was being installed by mid-2025, and Google received a permit that December to begin an $85 million interior renovation. The exterior construction crane was disassembled in early 2026. The artist Judy Chicago, who had been hired to create an artwork for the building's atrium, resigned that February due to creative disagreements with Google.

Leasing of the building's office and commercial space began in March 2026, at which point Google planned to move in the following year. Google also announced that the building's formal name would be shortened to "Thompson Center" rather than being changed to "Google Center". The Thompson Center's other initial tenants included financial services firm Morningstar, Inc.. That September, Google released renderings of the building's interiors and hired the artist Sanford Biggers to create a 30-foot-tall (9.1 m) sculpture, Vector, outside the main entrance. The interior renovations included a new staircase in the atrium, an enlarged atrium opening, and open-plan workspaces.

== Architecture ==
The Thompson Center was designed by Helmut Jahn of Murphy/Jahn, with Lester B. Knight & Associates as the mechanical and structural engineer. The building has 17 stories and is variously cited as measuring 308 feet (94 m) or 332 feet (101 m) high. It has a curved, sloped facade abutting a plaza on the southeast corner of the property. Though the building occupies a rectangular city block, the entire southern elevation curves around from the site's southwest corner to the middle of its eastern boundary.

The design was simultaneously futuristic, with advanced architectural features for the time, and historicist, recalling the grandeur of large public spaces. Jahn stated that he wanted the building to stand out from nearby structures. Conversely, Jahn did not believe the design was overly radical, as it included several architectural elements that were also present in older buildings. For instance, the design included a central atrium, inspired by those in the old Chicago Federal Building and other early-20th-century structures. Other architectural elements were derived from the Art Deco style and from early industrial architecture.

=== Exterior ===
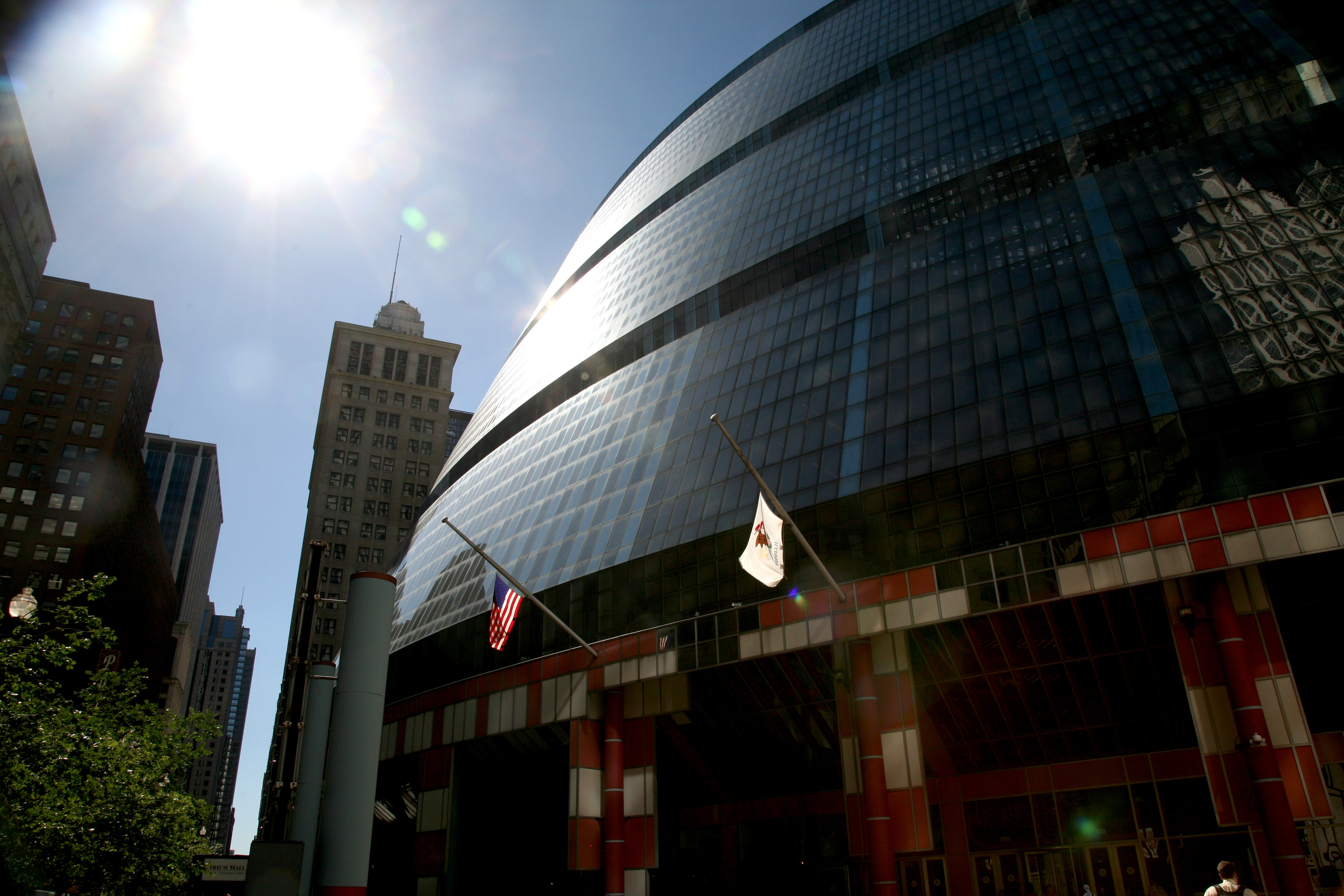
Exterior of the building prior to the 2020s renovation

According to Jahn, the building's general form, or shape, was intended to represent the "centrality of government". As envisioned, the facade has three setbacks. From the north and west, the structure was originally made of blue glass but otherwise has a similar appearance to other office towers. The setbacks on the curving south facade were visible on the facade's eastern elevation. The building's original colors were intended to resemble those of the American flag, with pale or pastel red, white and blue on finishes and exposed girders. The color of the street-level panels were compared to tomato soup. Early plans for the building called for granite sidewalks, recalling the material used in the adjacent City Hall-County Building. In addition, the spandrel panels between windows were intended to be blue at the bottom, gray in the middle, and white at the top.

The facade was originally made of 24,600 glass panes. Originally, the design called for curved, double-paned (insulated) glass panels, but these were substituted due to budget overruns. Flat, insulated glass had been suggested, but was dismissed by Jahn. Single-paned (non-insulated), curved glass panels were eventually used, and resulted in the need for a more expensive air conditioning system, which remained very costly to operate. It was insufficient on hot days, when internal temperatures reached as high as 90 °F (32 °C), and it let in cold air during the winter. Furthermore, the facade faced south, where sunlight exposure was the greatest during the day. Prior to 2009, the facade included 1,000 pieces of granite, each weighing 200 to 600 pounds (91 to 272 kg). There was a granite colonnade at ground level, whose columns tapered at their tops. On the building's roof is a sloped skylight, which covers the building's atrium; (Note: Sources variously cite the rotunda's diameter as 160 feet (49 m), 162 feet (49 m), or 180 feet (55 m).) this was intended to recall the domes of older courthouses.

As part of the 2020s renovation, enclosed terraces are being built at the building's southeast corner, spanning three levels. In addition, the original patterned-glass facade is being replaced with a more opaque-looking design covering the whole facade, with three layers of glass. The colonnade at ground level is also being expanded.

=== Interior ===
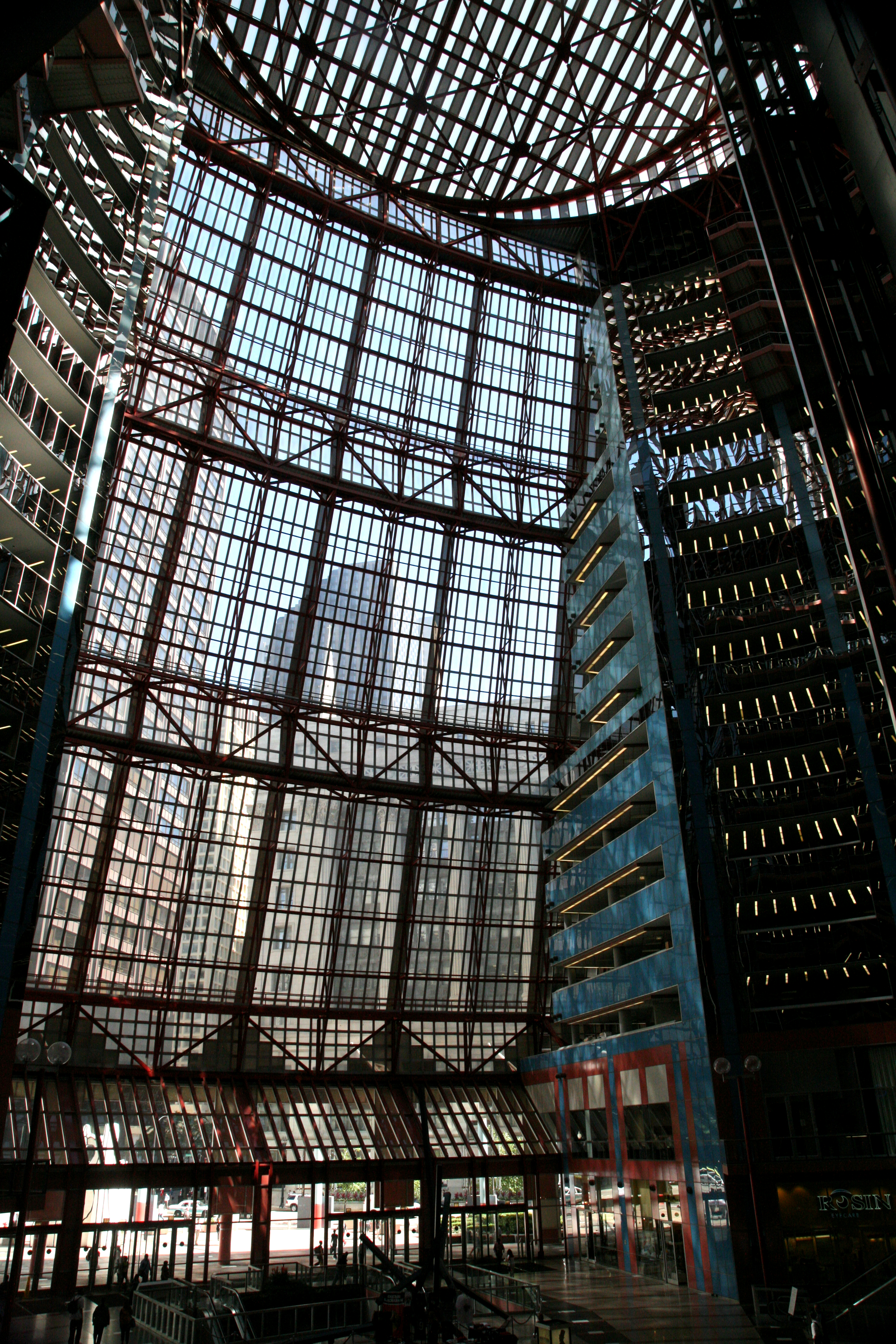
Wall of the atrium

The Thompson Center's atrium is one of several to be built in Chicago during the 1980s. Visitors to the Thompson Center's interior see all 17 floors layered partway around the atrium in a semicircular curve. The roof of the atrium rises 160 feet (49 m) above the floor; due to its height, the atrium has been the location of several suicide attempts. The original plans for the atrium called for stainless-steel wall panels, alternating with black and white panels, and a rosette at the center of the granite floor. The building also included an exterior waterfall, with a basin extending indoors into the atrium. In addition, the atrium included open-air escalators, along with glass-covered elevator shafts, similar to the elevator shafts in John Portman's hotels. Balconies and criss-crossing stairways were also located within the atrium, and a gallery with a 42-inch-tall (1,100 mm) handrail encircled it on every floor. Commercial space took up the basement, first story, and second story, and there was also a 600-seat auditorium.

The interiors were decorated in a variety of color schemes, with blue, pink, and white panels. On the 3rd through 16th floors, offices stretched back from the atrium to the rectangular end of the building. The open-plan offices on each floor were supposed to carry the message of "an open government in action." Later in the building's history, the interiors were subdivided, but employees reported that the plywood partitions were not soundproof. As designed, similar departments were grouped on the same floors, and each floor had a central reception area. The interior frame is made mostly of steel. When the building was constructed, there was a private elevator for the governor's office, which stopped at the sub-basement, ground story, and 16th stories; this elevator was built because state officials had deemed the atrium elevators a safety risk. The building also had six emergency-exit stairways, which were positioned so that all offices were within 50 feet (15 m) of an emergency stair.

The building's mechanical systems, such as heating and lighting, were controlled by a computer system when it was completed. During the summer, the interior spaces were originally cooled using a mixture of freon and ice. A tank in the building converted water to freon, which was either warmed up and ventilated through the roof, or cooled down and pumped through air coils. The freon was created and stored at night, when it was cheaper to do so. During the winter, warm freon instead traveled to a water exchanger that pumped freon to boxes around the building, which in turn warmed up the glass facade. In practice, the building still had issues with temperature modulation during the summer and winter.

=== Art ===
The building included 19 specially commissioned artworks funded by the State of Illinois Art-in-Architecture Program. The building also had over 150 of the state's 600 works collected under the Percent for Art program; these works were valued at $2.1 million in 2000. Under this program, 0.5% of the money designated for construction of state-funded public buildings is used for the purchase of art. Only about 15 pieces were typically visible to the public. The Illinois Artisans Shop was also housed inside the building, with a store on the second floor. The Illinois Art Gallery, displaying work from artists based in the state, was located on the second floor as well. When the structure was completed, Dave Schneidman of the Chicago Tribune wrote that the structure "promises to be the most art-heavy building in the city except for the Art Institute of Chicago".

Originally positioned in front of the Thompson Center was a sculpture, Monument with Standing Beast, created in 1984 by Jean Dubuffet. Weighing 10 short tons (8.9 long tons; 9.1 t), the structure was made of fiberglass and was 29 feet (8.8 m) tall. The state government announced plans to relocate the sculpture after Alphabet Inc. acquired the building in 2022, and Monument with Standing Beast was dismantled in 2024.

== Impact ==
=== Reception ===
==== Contemporary ====
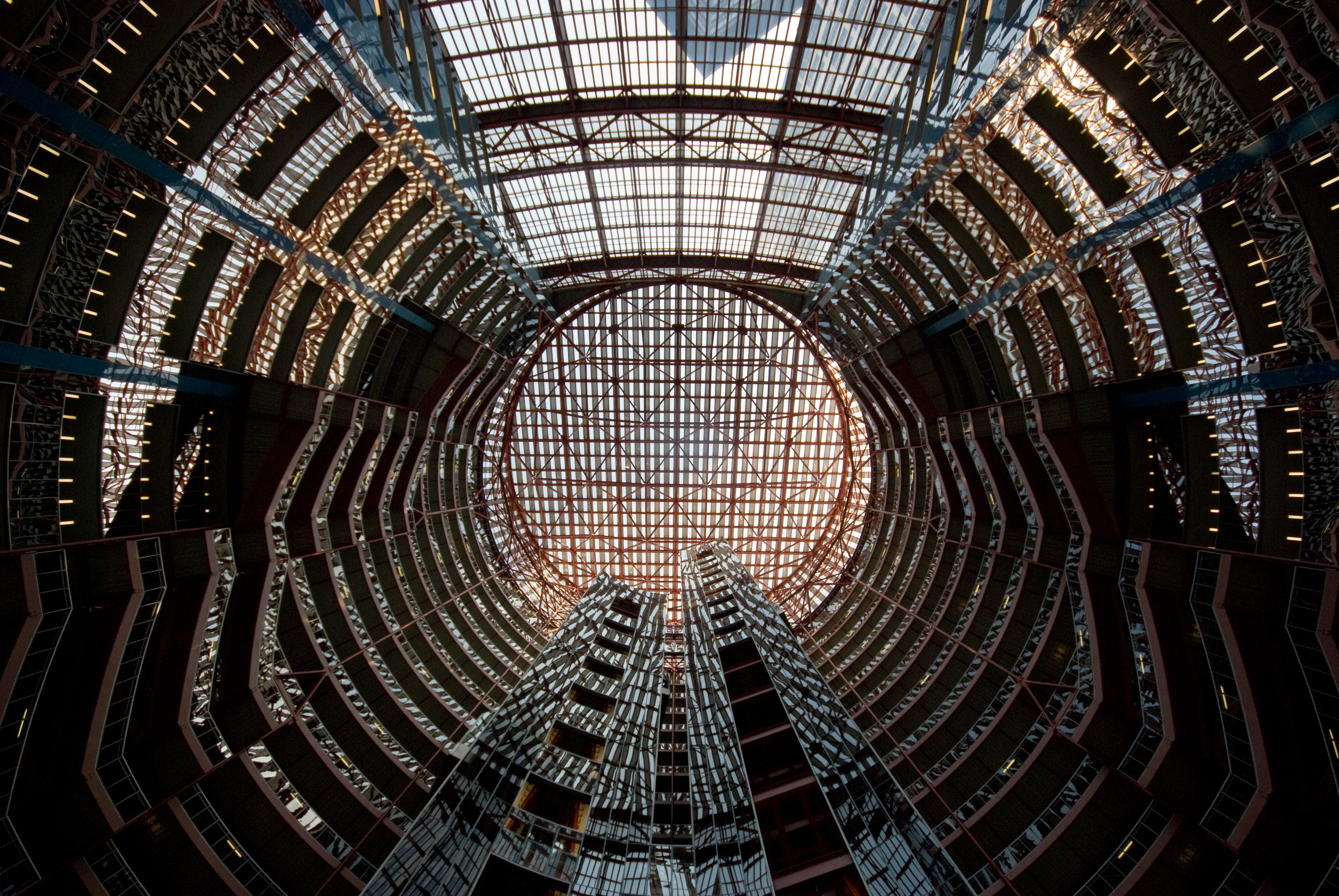
Atrium ceiling seen from within

When the building was being developed, it stood in stark contrast to the Miesian glass towers that had been built in the city after World War II. The design was highly controversial when the building was constructed, in part because of this contrast with other buildings. Detractors, such as the historian Carl W. Condit and the architect John Hartray, said it did not blend in with other buildings, nor did it resemble any previous designs. The architect Harry Weese saw it as "tinselly and decadent—a goldfish bowl that symbolizes the fragility of our society".

Ada Louise Huxtable of The New York Times called the State of Illinois Center a "spectacular glass-and-metal sweep of high-tech, hard-edged geometry" that contrasted sharply with the exactly-contemporary Portland Building. Writing for the same newspaper, Paul Goldberger said that the building encapsulated the monumental character of older structures without copying their design details, though he questioned the use of blue panels on the rear facade. Chicago Tribune critic Paul Gapp called the State of Illinois Center "monumental without being overpowering", while another Tribune writer perceived the exterior as formidable and the interior as exhilarating. The Christian Science Monitor said the building's form and facade was unusual for a downtown district. A writer for Gentlemen's Quarterly described the structure as "typical of Chicago's new thinking", and another writer for the same magazine said the building had "been labeled a Tower of Babel facsimile". Thompson himself saw the structure as "the first building of the year 2000".

After its completion, Gapp wrote that the building "is the most cerebral, the most abstract, yet easily the most spectacular building ever constructed in the Loop", while other writers stated that the State of Illinois Center was impossible to miss. Goldberger wrote that the building's mishmash of architectural elements "is all pretty shrill, and not a little vulgar", though he praised the atrium as a lively space. Similarly, Sam Hall Kaplan of the Los Angeles Times said that, while the building had a garish color scheme and a myriad of mechanical problems, its design was in line with other architecturally unusual Chicago buildings. The structure was likened to a spaceship, a "pie wedge with a large cookie", an oversized gas station, or a bloated crystal sphere.

The building won an award for its unconventional design in 1986 from the American Institute of Architects' (AIA) Chicago chapter. In 1991, a nationwide survey of AIA members voted the building as one of the United States' ten best buildings built since 1980. Another survey of 530 pedestrians, conducted by the AIA in 1993, ranked the Thompson Center as Chicago's second-favorite commercial-office building.

==== Retrospective ====
Politico retrospectively wrote that the Thompson Center was one of several buildings in Chicago that were initially widely criticized, only to be acclaimed later on. Chicago Tribune critic Blair Kamin wrote in 2014 that the building's design was futuristic for its time, but that the design had failed to account for practical needs such as occupants' comfort. Kamin later attributed the backlash to the Thompson Center's design as having precipitated more banal designs, such as the Harold Washington Library and the United Center. In part due to the design, Jahn was sometimes called "Flash Gordon", a nickname he later applied to his sailboat. In the years after the building's completion, Jahn designed few buildings in Chicago and focused on designing structures outside the United States. A 1994 guidebook of Chicago architecture called the Thompson Center "a realistic representation of the merry-go-round chaos of bureaucracy", while a 2002 New York Times article deemed it "exuberantly colorful and controversial". A writer for Gentlemen's Quarterly said in 2006 that the building was "a bravura display of engineering prowess". Kamin, by contrast, called the structure one of Chicago's largest eyesores in 2003.

When officials considered selling the Thompson Center in 2015, Chicago magazine wrote that the building "was supposed to be transparent, colorful, and open, a panopticon for the people", while Kamin said that the building, for all its flaws, was worth preserving. A critic for the St. Louis Post-Dispatch called it "a symbol of extravagant recklessness" but also signified Chicago's position in state politics. Curbed wrote in 2017 that the Thompson Center was a "significant postmodern building from Helmut Jahn". The preservationist Elizabeth Blasius wrote in The Architect's Newspaper the next year that the building "has become an emblematic figure of the timely realities tied to preserving postmodernism", and another preservationist, the architect Jonathan Solomon, said there was "a lot of diversity of opinion about the James R. Thompson Center".

After the 2020s renovation was announced, The Architectural Review wrote in 2023 that the plan would "denude this messy public forum for grievance, commerce and service with the technocratic anaesthesiology of Silicon Valley's surveillance apparatus", turning the atrium into a "sterile, off-brand Apple Store". Owen Hopkins of Dezeen wrote that the revised design "will strip so much of the uniqueness from the postmodern building they may as well demolish it", while a writer for The Architect's Newspaper said the old design had been an "egalitarian postmodern palace".

=== In popular culture ===
The Thompson Center has been a filming location in several motion pictures and TV series. When it was completed, the TV show T. J. Hooker was filmed at the building. The building was also used as a set for the 1986 film Running Scared, the 1988 film Switching Channels, the 1989 film Music Box, the 1994 film Miracle on 34th Street (where it stood in as a department store), and the 2000 film The Watcher (where it was depicted as a shopping mall). The building was a featured location in It also served as the exterior for Gotham Square Garden in the 2022 film The Batman, though interior shots were filmed at London's O2 Arena.

In 2016–2017, filmmaker and cultural heritage activist Nathan Eddy directed a short documentary film about the Thompson Center, Starship Chicago, to protest the building's proposed demolition. The architect Stanley Tigerman appears in the film.
