= List of Art Deco architecture in Illinois =

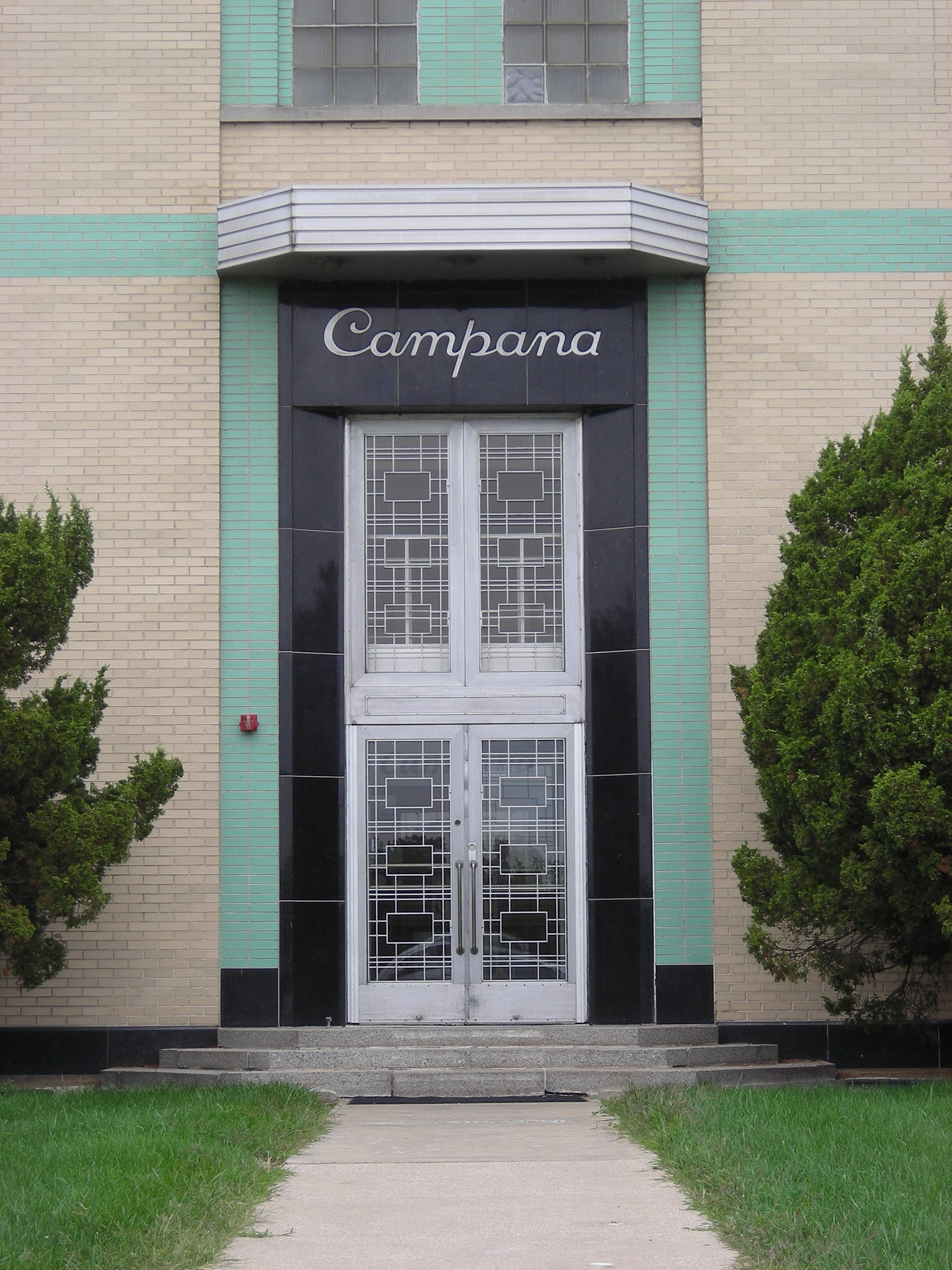
Front door of the Campana Factory building in Batavia

This is a list of buildings that are examples of the Art Deco architectural style in Illinois, United States.

== Aurora ==
- Aurora Elks Lodge No. 705, Aurora, 1926
- Fox River Pavilion, Aurora, 1932
- Paramount Theatre, Aurora, 1931

== Belvidere ==
- Auburn Theatre, Belvidere, 1942
- Community Building, Belvidere
- Old Belvidere High School Auditorium, Belvidere, 1938

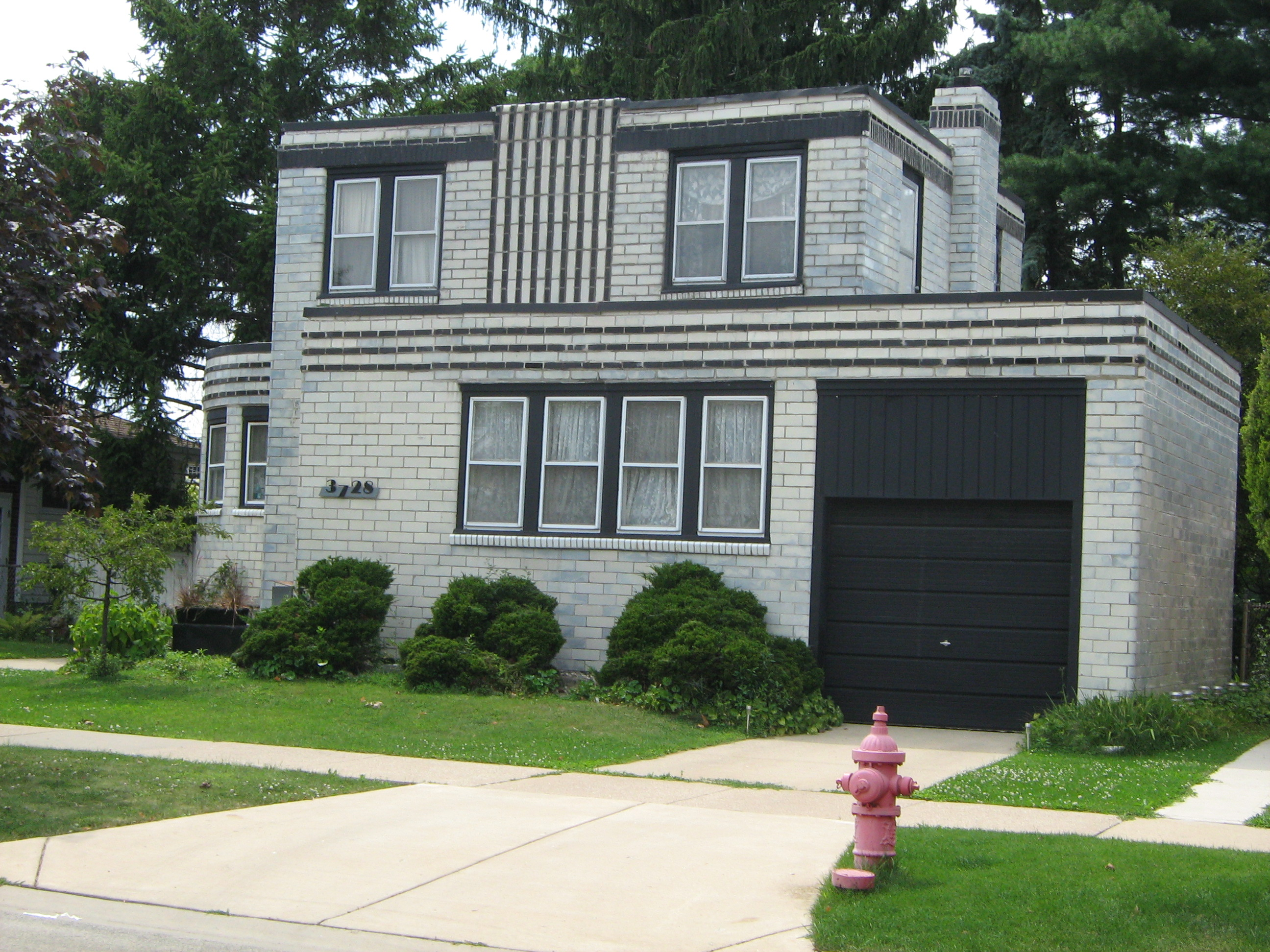
Mr. Robert Silhan House, Berwyn

== Berwyn ==
- Berwyn Health Center, Berwyn, 1939
- Berwyn Municipal Building, Berwyn, 1939
- Berwyn State Bank Building, Berwyn, 1929
- Mr. Robert Silhan House, Berwyn, 1937

== Champaign ==
- Champaign Central High School, Champaign, 1956
- Champaign City Building, Champaign, 1937
- Christie Clinic, Champaign, 1929
- Illinois National Guard Building, Champaign

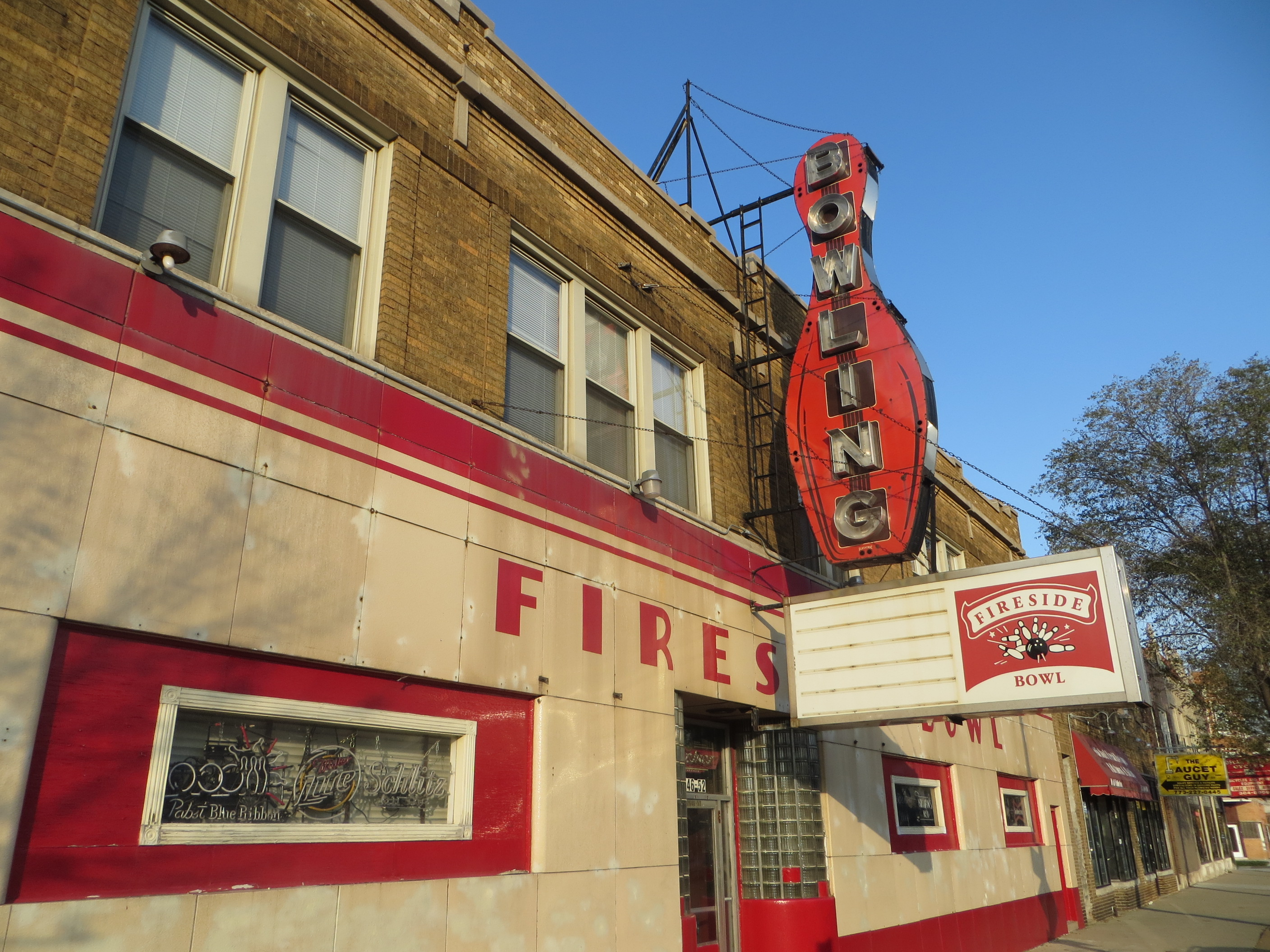
The Fireside Bowl, Chicago

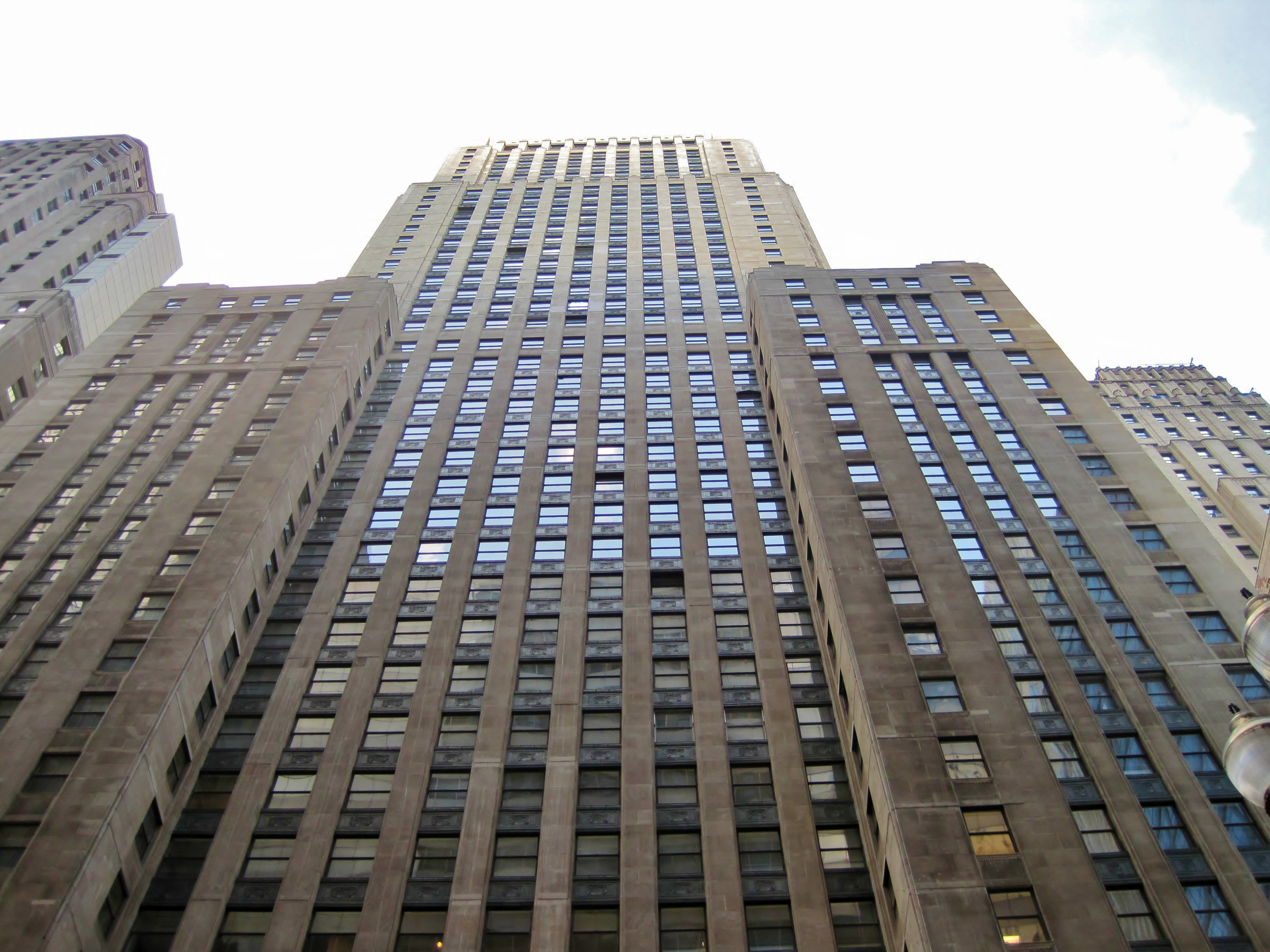
One North LaSalle Building, Chicago

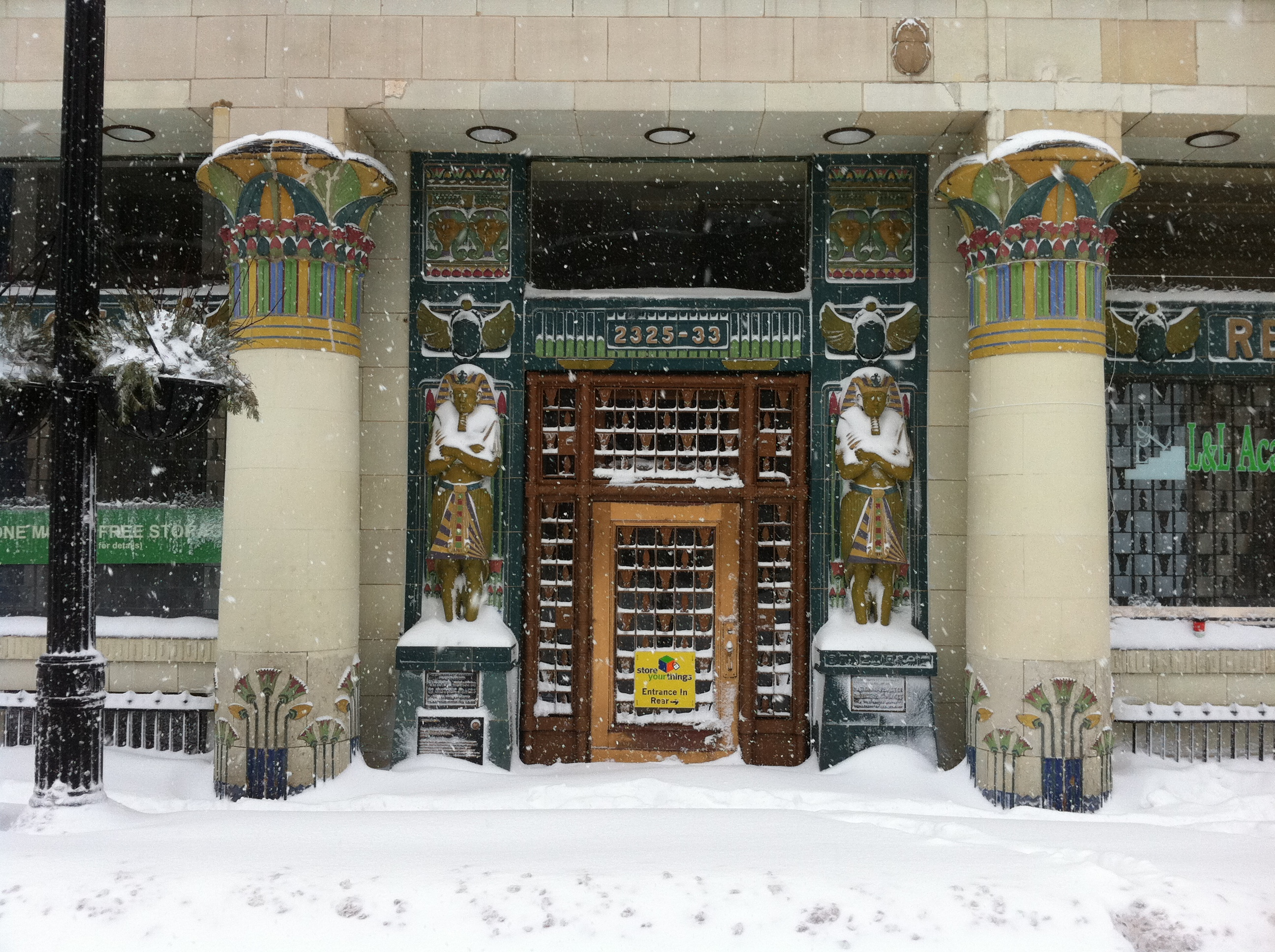
Reebie Storage Warehouse, Chicago

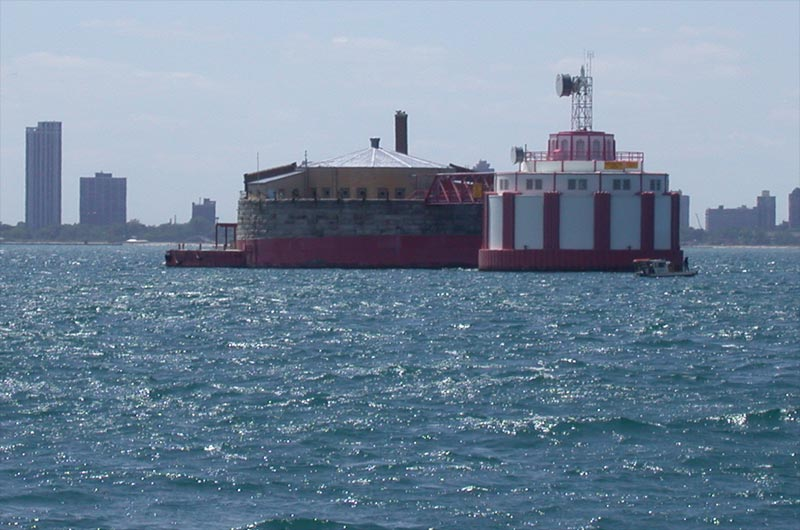
William E. Dever Crib, Chicago

== Chicago ==
- 33 North LaSalle, Chicago, 1930
- 333 North Michigan, Chicago, 1928
- 3640 North Halsted Street, Lakeview Historic District, Chicago
- 4936 South Ashland Avenue, Chicago, 1939
- 6422 North Western Avenue, Chicago, 1920s
- A. W. Enterprises, Inc., Chicago, 1940s
- Adler Planetarium, Chicago, 1930
- Belle Shore Apartment Hotel, Chicago, 1929
- Belmont-Sheffield Trust and Savings Bank Building, Chicago, 1928
- Buckingham Building, Chicago, 1930
- Bull Dog Lock Co., Chicago, 1947
- Carbide and Carbon Building, Chicago, 1929
- Carl Street Studios, West Burton Place Historic District, Chicago, 1927
- Century Tower, Chicago, 1930
- Chicago Beach Apartments, Chicago, 1929
- Chicago Bee Building, South Side, Chicago, 1926
- Chicago Board of Trade Building, Chicago, 1930
- Chicago Evening Post Building, West Loop–LaSalle Street Historic District, Chicago, 1928
- Chicago Federation of Musicians Building, West Loop–LaSalle Street Historic District, Chicago, 1933, 1949
- Chicago Vocational High School, Chicago, 1941
- Civic Opera House, Chicago, 1929
- Clark Adams Building, Chicago, 1927
- Edward P. Russell House, Chicago, 1929
- Engineering Building, 205 West Wacker Drive, West Loop–LaSalle Street Historic District, Chicago, 1928
- Field Building, Chicago, 1928–1934
- The Fireside Bowl, Chicago, 1941
- First Church of Deliverance, Chicago, 1929
- Foreman State National Bank Building, 33 North LaSalle, West Loop–LaSalle Street Historic District, Chicago, 1930
- Frank Fisher Apartments, Chicago, 1936
- Gramercy Row Apartments, Chicago
- Grein Funeral Directors Building, Chicago, 1931
- Illinois National Guard Building, Chicago, 1940
- Jeffery Terrace Apartments, Chicago, 1929
- L. Fish Furniture Co., Chicago, 1931
- Laramie State Bank Building, Chicago, 1929
- LaSalle–Wacker Building, Chicago, 1930
- Madonna Della Strada Chapel, Loyola University Chicago, Rogers Park, Chicago, 1939
- Mark Twain Hotel, Chicago, 1930
- McGraw–Hill Building façade, Chicago, 1929
- Merchandise Mart, Chicago, 1930
- Morton Building, 208 West Washington, West Loop–LaSalle Street Historic District, Chicago, 1927
- Mundelein College, Chicago, 1930
- The Narragansett, Kenwood, Chicago, 1928
- NBC Tower, Chicago, 1989
- Nederlander Theatre, Chicago, 1926
- New Bismark Hotel (now Hotel Allegro), 71 West Randolph Street, Chicago, 1926
- Northwest Tower, Chicago, 1928
- One North LaSalle Building, Chicago, 1930
- Outer Drive Bridge, Chicago, 1937
- Palmolive Building, Chicago, 1929
- Paul J. Quetschke & Co., Chicago, 1940s
- Polish National Alliance Headquarters, West Town, Chicago, 1938
- Powhatan Apartments, Chicago, 1929
- Produce Terminal Cold Storage Company Building, Near West Side, Chicago, 1929
- Rosenwald Court Apartments, Bronzeville, Chicago, 1929
- Reebie Storage Warehouse, Chicago, 1922
- Riverside Plaza, Chicago, 1929
- St. Wenceslaus Church, Chicago, 1941
- Sears Department Store, Irving Park, Chicago, 1938
- Spiegel Office Building, Bridgeport, Chicago, 1937
- Standard Sanitary Manufacturing Co., Central Manufacturing District–Original East Historic District, Chicago, 1928
- Theophil Studios, Chicago, 1940
- Transparent Package Company, Central Manufacturing District–Original East Historic District, Chicago, 1940s
- Union Park Hotel, Chicago, 1930
- Universal Studios Film Exchange, Chicago, 1937
- Valentine Chicago Boy's Club, Chicago, 1938
- Victor F. Lawson House YMCA, Chicago, 1934
- Wacker Tower, Chicago, 1928
- Wholesale Florists Exchange, Near West Side, Chicago, 1927
- William E. Dever Crib, Chicago
- Willoughby Tower, Chicago, 1929
- Windsor Beach Apartments, South Shore, Chicago, 1928

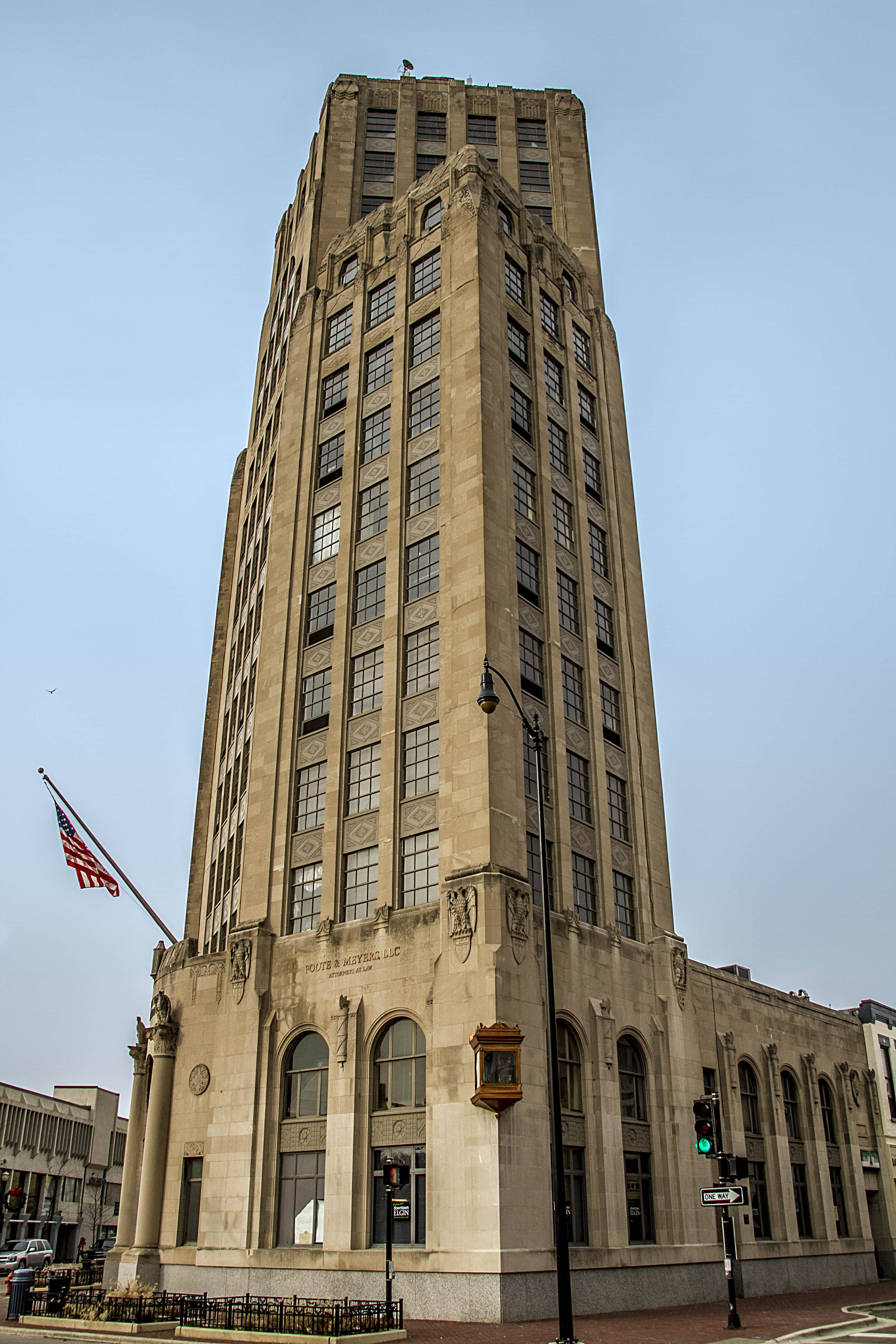
Elgin Tower Building, Elgin

== Elgin ==
- Bowlway Lanes, Elgin, 1942
- Elgin Tower Building (former Home Banks Building), Elgin, 1929
- Evolution Motors (former Castle Auto Sales), Elgin, 1920s
- Illinois National Guard Building, Elgin
- Salvation Army, Elgin, 1930

== Monmouth ==
- Maple City Dairy, Monmouth Courthouse Commercial Historic District, Monmouth, 1935
- Rivoli Theatre, Monmouth, 1920s, 1930
- Woolworth's Building, Monmouth Courthouse Commercial Historic District, Monmouth, 1939

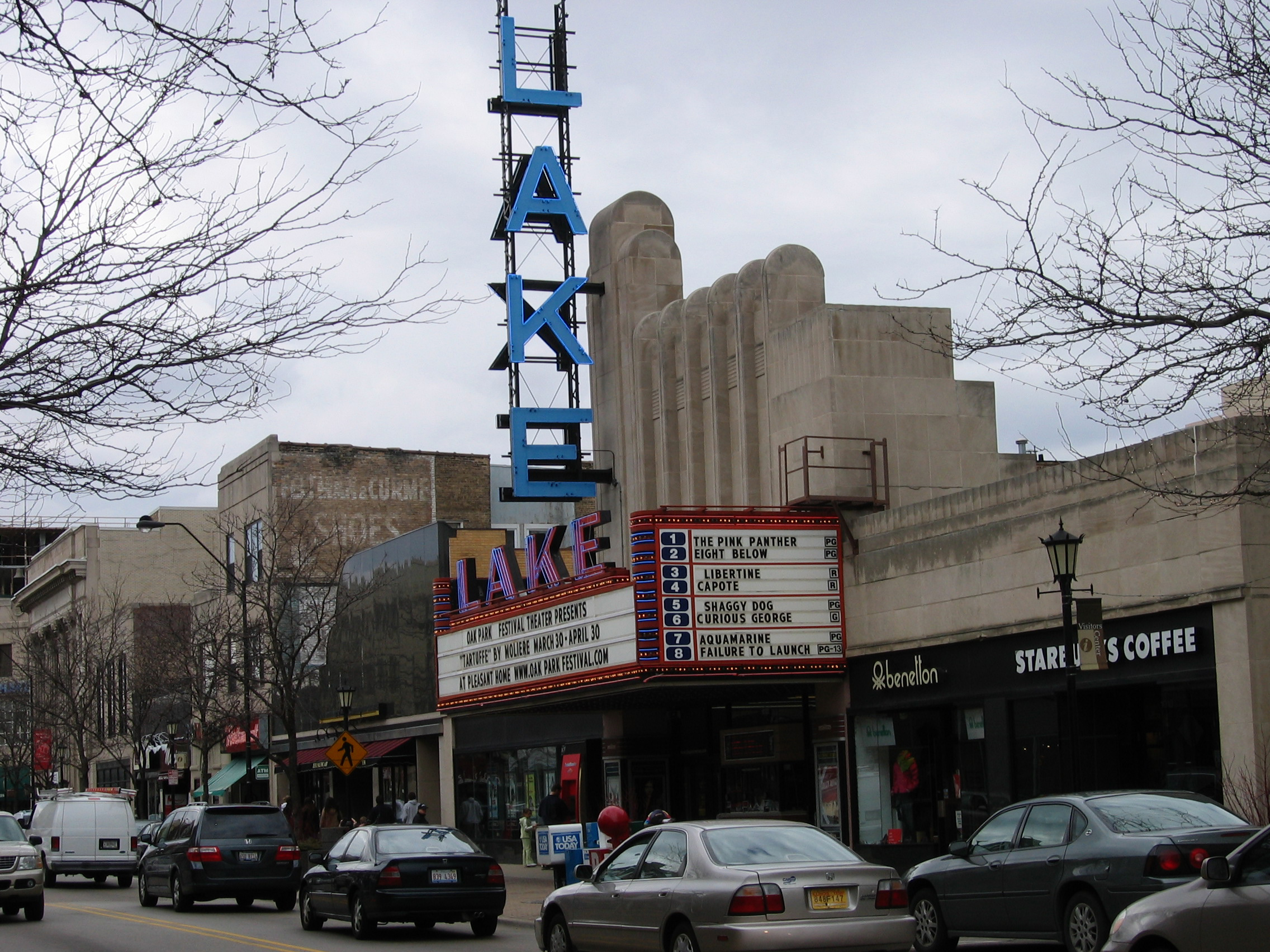
Lake Theater, Oak Park

== Oak Park ==
- Forsyth Building, Oak Park, 1929
- Lake Theater, Oak Park, 1936
- Marshall Field and Company Store, Oak Park, 1928
- Medical Arts Building, Oak Park, 1929

== Quincy ==
- 116 North 5th, Quincy
- 606 Maine, Quincy
- Coca-Cola Bottling Company Building, Quincy, 1940
- Gardner Memorial Boy Scout Service Center (former Chatten House), Quincy, 1940
- Kresge's, 530 Maine Street, Quincy
- Lincoln-Douglas Apartments, Quincy, 1930
- State Theater, Quincy, 1938

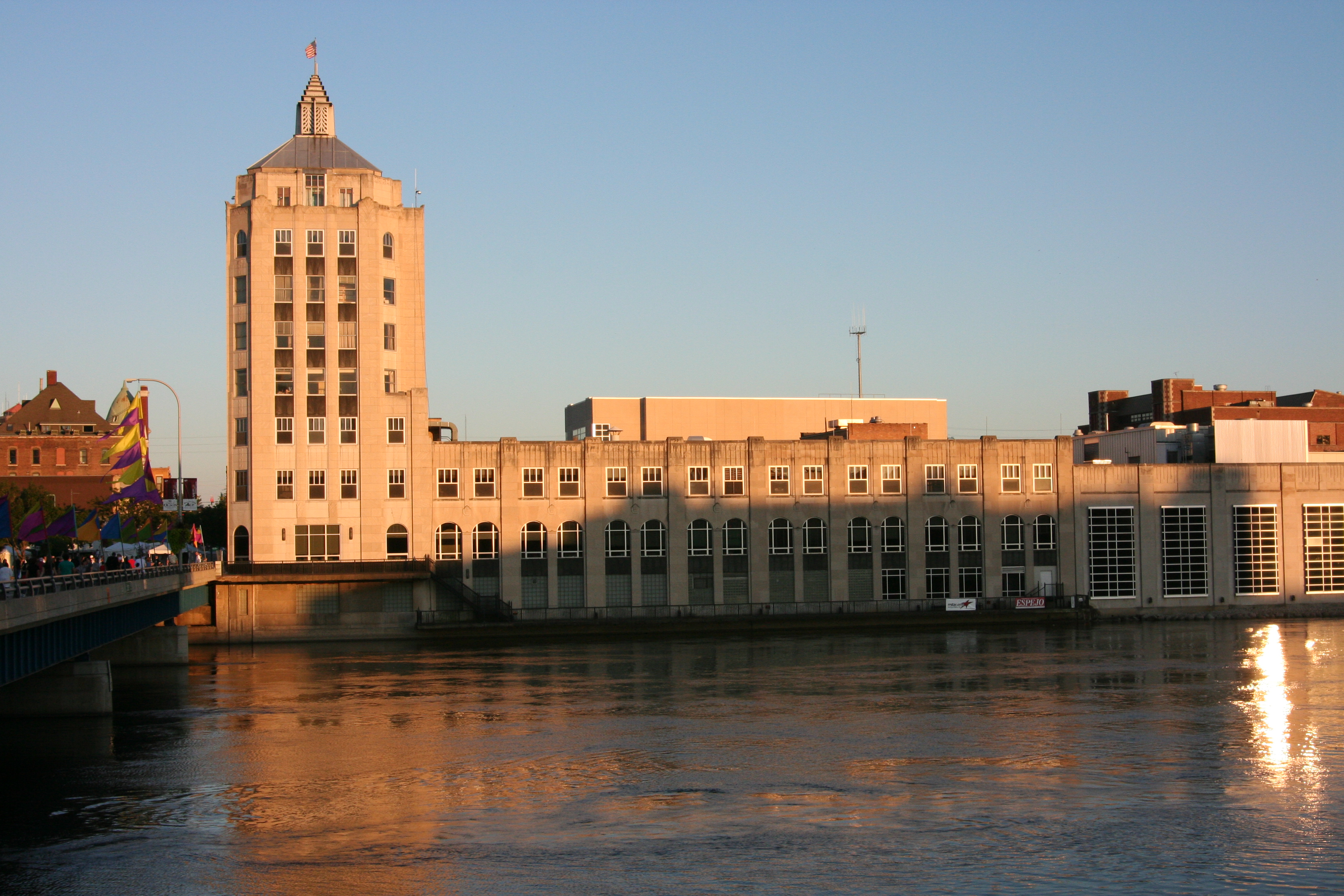
Rockford Morning Star Building, Rockford

== Rockford ==
- 3603 Highcrest Road, Rockford, 1949
- Central Illinois Gas & Electric Building, 303 North Main, Rockford, 1929
- Four Squires Building (former W.T. Grant Building), Rockford, 1920s
- Illinois Bank & Trust Building, Rockford
- Illinois National Guard Armory, Rockford, 1937
- J.C. Penney Building, West Downtown Rockford Historic District, Rockford
- Jackson Piano Building/Liebling Building, Rockford, 1927
- Porter's Corner, West Downtown Rockford Historic District, Rockford, 1929
- Rockford East High School, Rockford, 1940
- Rockford Morning Star Building, Rockford, 1928
- Rockford Public Library, Nordlof Center (former S. H. Kress & Co. Building), Rockford
- Rockford West High School, Rockford, 1939
- Security Building, Co., Rockford, 1920s
- Times Theatre, Rockford, 1938

== Urbana ==
- Cinema Gallery (former Cinema Theater), Urbana, 1915 and 1934
- Illinois National Guard Building, Urbana
- James McLaren White's Chemistry Annex Building, Noyes Laboratory of Chemistry, University of Illinois at Urbana-Champaign, Urbana, 1930

== Other cities ==
- Apollo Theatre, Princeton, 1882 and 1940s
- Ariston Cafe, Litchfield, 1935
- Arlee Theater, Mason City, 1936
- Bloom High School, Chicago Heights, 1931–1934
- Campana Factory, Batavia, 1937
- Daily Times Building, Ottawa, 1939
- Du Quoin State Fairgrounds, Du Quoin, 1923
- Egyptian Theatre, DeKalb, 1929
- Fort Armstrong Theatre, Rock Island, 1920
- Fox Theatre, Centralia Commercial Historic District, Centralia, 1930
- Griesheim Building (former Kresge's), Lincoln, 1932
- Haish Memorial Library, DeKalb, 1930
- Health Education Building, Eastern Illinois University, Charleston, 1938
- Holy Trinity Roman Catholic Church, Bloomington, 1934
- Hotel Belleville, Belleville, 1931
- Illinois Building, Illinois State Fairgrounds, Springfield
- Illinois National Guard Building, Cairo, 1932
- Illinois National Guard Building, Pontiac, 1939
- Independent Order of Odd Fellows Meeting Hall, Centralia Commercial Historic District, Centralia, 1932
- Institute for Food Safety and Health, Illinois Institute of Technology, Bedford Park, 1948–49
- Joliet Regional Airport, Joliet, 1930
- Liberty Theater, Murphysboro, 1913 and 1938
- Marcucci Building, Lincoln, 1930
- Marion Veterans Affairs Medical Center, Marion, 1941
- Masonic Hall Harmony Lodge No. 3, Jacksonville, 1930s
- Masonic Temple, Danville, 1916
- Masonic Temple, Decatur, 1924
- Meredith Memorial Home (former Belleville Hotel), Belleville
- Naval Air Station Glenview Air Tower, Glenview, 1923
- New Clark Theatre, Barry, 1939
- Normal Theater, Normal, 1937
- North Shore Sanitary District Tower, Highland Park, 1931
- Paramount Theatre, Kankakee, 1931
- Pickwick Theatre, Park Ridge, 1928
- Riverside Park Bandshell, Murphysboro, 1939
- St. Charles Municipal Building, St. Charles, 1940
- Sandoval Community High School, Sandoval
- South Town Theatre, Springfield, 1915 and 1937
- State Farm Downtown Building, Bloomington, 1929
- Sterling Daily Gazette Building, Sterling, 1935
- Sycamore State Theater (former Fargo Theater), Sycamore, 1925
- Ulmer Jewelers, Harvard, 1930s
- United States Post Office, Marshall Business Historic District, Marshall, 1936
- United States Post Office and Courthouse, Peoria, 1938
- Varsity Center for the Arts, Carbondale, 1940 and 1981
- Washington Elementary School, Jacksonville, 1932
- Will Rogers Theatre, Charleston, 1935–1938
- York Theater, Elmhurst, 1924
- Zoe Theatre, Pittsfield, 1950

== See also ==
- List of Art Deco architecture
- List of Art Deco architecture in the United States
- Architecture of Chicago
