= Richard M. Noyes =

American physical chemist

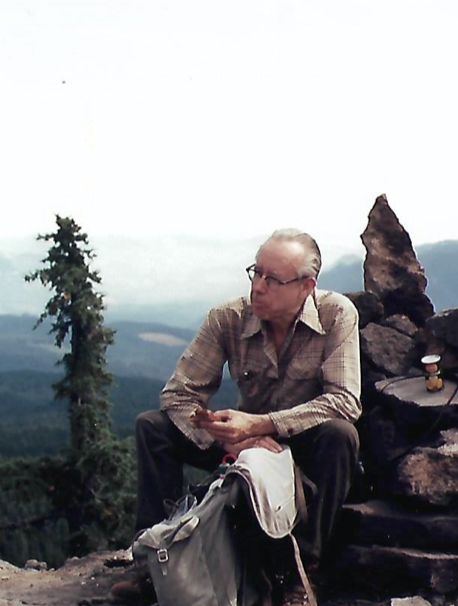
- Richard M. Noyes
- Born: April 6, 1919; Champaign, Illinois
- Died: November 25, 1997 (aged 78)
- Education: Harvard College and California Institute of Technology
- Known for: FKN mechanism
- Scientific career
- Workplaces: University of Oregon

Richard Macy Noyes (April 6, 1919 – November 25, 1997) was an American physical chemist.

== Family ==
Noyes was born April 6, 1919, in Champaign, Illinois, to the American chemist William Noyes and his third wife Katherine Macy, daughter of Jesse Macy. His older half-brother was Albert (1898–1980) and his brother Pierre (1923 - 2016); both were chemists.

== Education ==
He graduated from Harvard College and California Institute of Technology.

== Career ==
In 1959 Noyes became Professor of Chemistry at the University of Oregon. His research area was focused on the kinetic studies of oscillating reactions. Together with Richard J. Field and Endre Kőrös, he developed a model (FKN mechanism) in 1972 to describe the Belousov–Zhabotinsky reaction. In 1976, he was able to identify the reaction mechanism of the Bray–Liebhafsky reaction.

Noyes has received numerous honors and awards. He received the Guggenheim Fellowship in 1955 and the Fulbright Research Fellowship in 1964. 1978 and 1979 he was awarded with the Alexander von Humboldt Senior American Scientist Award. It was elected in 1977 as a member of the National Academy of Sciences and in 1989 elected as a member of the American Academy of Arts and Sciences. During his career he published 190 scientific articles in various journals. He was also associate editor of the Journal of Physical Chemistry. On his 70th birthday he was honored by the Journal with a Festschrift.

He died on November 25, 1997.

== See also ==
- Oscillating reaction
- Oregonator

== Works ==
- 1985 (with P. G. Bowers). Gas evolution oscillators. In Oscillations and Traveling Waves in Chemical Systems, eds. RJ Field and M. Burger, pp. 473–92. New York: Wiley-Interscience.
- 1986th Kinetics and mechanisms of complex reactions. In Investigations of Rates and Mechanisms of Reactions, vol. 6, part 1, ed C. F. Bernasconi, pp. 373–423. New York: John Wiley & Sons.
