= W. Albert Noyes Jr. =

American chemist (1898–1980)

William Albert Noyes, Jr.
- Born: April 18, 1898; Terre Haute, Indiana, United States
- Died: November 25, 1980 (aged 82)
- Education: Grinnell College; University of Paris
- Known for: Photochemistry
- Awards: Priestley Medal (1954); Willard Gibbs Award (1956)
- Scientific career
- Fields: Chemistry
- Workplaces: University of California, Berkeley; University of Chicago; Brown University; University of Rochester; University of Texas at Austin
- Doctoral advisor: Henry Le Chatelier

William Albert Noyes Jr. (April 18, 1898 – November 25, 1980), commonly known as W. Albert Noyes Jr., was an American chemist known for his contributions to photochemistry. During World War II, he was a leader in U.S. defense research efforts. He chaired the chemistry department at the University of Rochester, edited several important chemistry journals, and throughout his career was a prominent voice for international scientific cooperation. He was the son of the renowned chemist William A. Noyes; they became the first father-son pair to win the Priestley Medal, the highest honor given by the American Chemical Society.

== Early life ==
William Albert Noyes Jr. was born on April 18, 1898, in Terre Haute, Indiana, the son of American chemist William A. Noyes, who was then a professor at the Rose Polytechnic Institute. When his father was offered a position at the National Bureau of Standards, the family moved to Baltimore, Maryland, where Noyes often accompanied his father to his laboratory on the campus of Johns Hopkins University. There, the young Noyes met prominent scientists and was introduced to chemistry. In 1907, when his father was offered a faculty position at the University of Illinois, Noyes moved to Urbana, Illinois, where he was raised.

Noyes enrolled at Grinnell College in 1914, but enlisted in the military in 1917, after the United States entered World War I. He went to France, where he served as an interpreter and radio operator. Grinnell College awarded him a bachelor's degree when his military enlistment ended in 1919. He then decided to enroll at the University of Paris (Sorbonne), where he studied in the lab of Henry Le Chatelier and earned his Ph.D. in chemistry in 1920.

== Career ==
Noyes began his scientific and academic career at the University of California, Berkeley, where he was a teaching fellow under Joel Henry Hildebrand. In 1921, he joined the faculty of the University of Chicago, where he remained for seven years. In 1925, he participated in a conference of the Faraday Society in Oxford, which has been called "the most important photochemistry meeting ever held." There, he delivered a paper called "The Formation of Polar Compounds by Photochemical Reactions." In 1929, he joined the faculty of Brown University, where he continued to build a reputation as a leading expert in photochemistry. During this period, he collaborated with Philip Leighton of Stanford University to write an influential textbook, The Photochemistry of Gases, which appeared in 1941.

In 1938, Noyes accepted an offer to join the University of Rochester as chair of the chemistry department. By 1940, he became involved in efforts to help the United States prepare for its entry into World War II by meeting regularly with the National Defense Research Committee and various universities involved in defense research. After the United States entered the war, Noyes was named head of the Chemical Warfare and Smoke Division of the newly formed Office of Scientific Research and Development. Throughout the war, he continued to teach at Rochester while conducting defense research, which required frequent travel to England and elsewhere. He also served as an editor of Chemical Reviews, a journal his father founded. After the war ended, he returned to Rochester full time, where he was the Charles Frederick Houghton Professor of Chemistry and remained chair of the chemistry department. In 1947, he served a term as president of the American Chemical Society. At the same time, he was instrumental in promoting international scientific cooperation, chiefly through his involvement in the formation of UNESCO. He was appointed dean of graduate studies at Rochester in 1952 and then acting dean of the college of arts and sciences in 1956. He also served as the editor of the Journal of the American Chemical Society from 1950 to 1962 and the Journal of Physical Chemistry from 1952 to 1964.

In 1963, Noyes joined the faculty of the University of Texas at Austin, where he continued to teach and conduct research until his retirement in 1973.

Noyes academic interests also extended beyond the field of chemistry into the study of metaphysics and the philosophy of science. In 1962 he assisted his colleague Colin Murray Turbayne in the preparation of his work The Myth of Metaphor.

== Family ==
Noyes's father was the American chemist William Noyes and his mother was Flora Collier Noyes. His two younger half-brothers were Richard (1919 – 1997) and Pierre (1923 - 2016); both were chemists.

== Honors ==
Noyes earned numerous honors throughout his career. These include:

- American Academy of Arts and Sciences, Elected Member (1931)
- National Academy of Sciences, Elected Member (1943)
- Honorary doctorate, Grinnell College (1946)
- American Philosophical Society, Elected Member (1947)
- Honorary doctorate, University of Rhode Island (1953)
- Priestley Medal (1954)
- Willard Gibbs Award (1956)
- Honorary doctorate, Indiana University (1958)
- Honorary doctorate, University of Illinois (1964)
- Honorary doctorate, University of Rochester (1965)
- Charles Lathrop Parsons Award (1970)
- French Academy of Sciences, Elected Member (1975)

By winning the Priestley Medal, Noyes and his father became the first father-son pair to win that prestigious award. His father won it in 1935.

In addition, the University of Rochester has a distinguished lecture series named in Noyes' honor.
