= Endre Kőrös =

Hungarian chemist

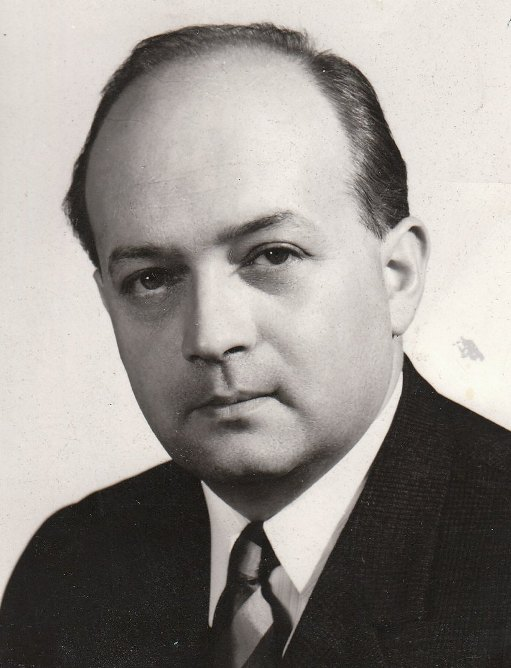
- Endre Kőrös in 1971
- Born: September 18, 1927; Győr, Hungary
- Died: February 18, 2002 (aged 74); Budapest
- Known for: FKN mechanism

Endre Kőrös (September 18, 1927 – February 18, 2002) was a Hungarian chemist mostly known in the field of nonlinear chemical dynamics. He helped to develop the FKN mechanism, a description of the Belousov–Zhabotinsky reaction involving 11 reactions and 12 species (21 intermediate species and 18 elementary steps), in 1972 with his colleagues Richard J. Field and Richard M. Noyes.

Endre Kőrös is a Széchenyi Prize-winning chemist and was a member of the Hungarian Academy of Sciences. He is a leading figure in 20th century chemistry. His main research focused on the field of analysis of complex chemicals and the reaction kinetics (studying the kinetics of chemical reactions). One of his most important contributions, together with his American colleagues Richard J. Field and Richard M. Noyes, is the development of the FKN mechanism which allows the modeling of the Belousov–Zhabotinsky reaction in 1972. From 1949 to his death in 2002, he worked at Eötvös Loránd University in the Inorganic and Analytical Chemistry Department. He obtained his degree in 1949, became an intern in 1950, and became University Professor in 1969. He retired in 1997. After his retirement he still kept working as Professor Emeritus at the chemistry department until his death in 2002.

== Career ==
At the beginning of his career he worked in the field of instrumental analytical chemistry. Within this field, he worked on complex chemical reactions, radio chemistry, and spectroscopy. In the 1950s, he was interested in the chemistry of poly-sulfides and selenium (his PhD was on the subject of selenium).

At the end of the 1950s, he shifted his interest to solutions kinetic properties with nonlinear reactions. Here he contributed significantly to the understanding of the relationship between the spatial structure of molecules and their reactivity. He introduced the concept of charge transfer auto-catalysis into the understanding of the spatio-temporal behavior of isotope-exchange reaction. According to this idea, the electron rich donor molecule and the electron depleted molecule experience a weak chemical bond and the speed of this reaction is proportional with the bond's strength. In the same period, he also worked on radio-chemistry and developed some techniques to purify cellulose based ion-exchange molecules. As he result he developed a very effective method for radioactive binding detections and to decontaminate radioactive solutions.

From the 1970s, his interest turned to oscillatory reactions. His international fame is due to his collaboration with Richard J. Field and Richard M. Noyes. In 1972, they published a description of the oscillatory Belousov–Zhabotinsky reaction involving 11 reactions and 12 species (21 intermediate species and 18 elementary steps). The FKN mechanism served as a starting point for the development of the Oregonator.

In the following years, Endre Kőrös worked closely with various Hungarian colleagues and found several novel chemical oscillators.

In 1990 he won the Széchenyi Prize together with Miklós Orbán and Zoltán Noszticzius for their contributions to the understanding of chemical oscillatory reactions.
