= William A. Noyes =

American chemist

William Albert Noyes
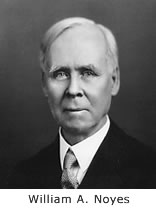
- Born: November 6, 1857 near Independence, Iowa, United States
- Died: October 24, 1941 (aged 83)
- Education: Grinnell College; Johns Hopkins University
- Known for: Camphor chemistry
- Awards: Willard Gibbs Award (1919)
- Scientific career
- Fields: Chemistry
- Workplaces: University of Illinois
- Doctoral advisor: Ira Remsen
- Doctoral students: Carl Shipp Marvel

William Albert Noyes (November 6, 1857 – October 24, 1941) was an American analytical and organic chemist. He made pioneering determinations of atomic weights, chaired the chemistry department at the University of Illinois Urbana–Champaign from 1907 to 1926, was the founder and editor of several important chemical journals, and received the American Chemical Society's highest award, the Priestley Medal, in 1935.

== Early life and education ==
Noyes was born on November 6, 1857, near Independence, Iowa, son of Spencer W. and Mary Noyes, née Packard. He earned A.B. and B.S. degrees from Grinnell College in 1879 (having originally enrolled in 1875 in classical studies, with chemistry as a side subject). As an undergraduate, in the winter quarters Noyes taught school full-time in the countryside. On graduating he studied and taught analytical chemistry at Grinnell, until he began graduate school at Johns Hopkins University in January 1881. There, working with Ira Remsen, Noyes earned his Ph.D. in 1882. His doctoral dissertation "On the oxidation of benzene with chromic acid" was completed in only one and a half years (despite his also having to do water analyses to earn a living). Grinnell also awarded him an A.M. degree for this work.

== Career ==
After receiving his doctorate, Noyes taught a year as an instructor at the University of Minnesota. He was next a professor of chemistry at the University of Tennessee, followed by seventeen years at Rose Polytechnic Institute in Terre Haute, Indiana (starting there in 1886). In 1903, Noyes was hired as the first "Chief Chemist" for the United States National Bureau of Standards in Baltimore, Maryland. His determination of atomic weights led to "one of the most precise chemical determinations ever made", the ratio of the masses of hydrogen to oxygen (which he found to be 1.00787:16). With H.C.P. Weber, he received the Nichols Medal (chemistry) in 1908 for determining the atomic weight of chlorine.

In 1907 he became chair of the chemistry department at the University of Illinois Urbana–Champaign, a position he would hold until 1926. In the process, he helped it to become one of the leading departments of chemistry in the United States. Despite his earlier work in analytical chemistry, Noyes is perhaps best known as an organic chemist. He was the first to prove the structure of camphor definitively and studied rearrangements in camphor and related compounds. He also worked on "electronic theories of valence, and the valence and nature of nitrogen in nitrogen trichloride" as well as developing "methods for the determination of phosphorus, sulfur, and manganese in iron".

== Editor ==
Noyes was the editor-in-chief of the Journal of the American Chemical Society from 1902 to 1917. In addition, he founded Chemical Abstracts and was its first editor from 1907 to 1910. He also founded American Chemical Society Scientific Monographs (serving as its first editor from 1919 to 1941) and Chemical Reviews (serving as its first editor from 1924 to 1926). Following the First World War, Noyes sought to promote international understanding and to reestablish harmonic relations between French and German chemists.

== Death and honors ==
Noyes was elected to the United States National Academy of Sciences in 1910, the American Academy of Arts and Sciences in 1913, and the American Philosophical Society in 1914. Noyes received the Priestley Medal, the American Chemical Society's highest award, in 1935. He died on October 24, 1941.

The Noyes Laboratory at the University of Illinois Urbana–Champaign was so named in his honor in 1939. The lab was originally built in 1902, expanded under Noyes in 1916 (more than doubling its size) and named an ACS National Historical Chemical Landmark by the ACS in its 100th year, 2002.

== Family ==
Noyes was the youngest son of Spencer W. Noyes and Mary Noyes, and was born on their farm. His first wife was Flora Collier Noyes. They had several children, but all except William, (born April 18, 1898, in Terre Haute, Indiana) died in early childhood. Flora was in poor health for some years before her death in March 1900. Noyes remarried in 1901 and had a son, Charles, in 1904. His second wife died of a stroke in August 1914. In the fall of 1915, Noyes married his third wife, Katharine Macy Noyes. They had two sons, Richard and Pierre. William, Richard, and Pierre all followed their father into the sciences and academia.

== Notes ==
- Quotations taken from A biography of William A. Noyes (University of Illinois Department of Chemistry website).
- American Chemical Society National Historic Chemical Landmarks Noyes Laboratory at the University of Illinois
- Wives and children information taken from Biography of William A. Noyes Jr.
