= Centralia Commercial Historic District =

Historic district in Illinois, United States

- U.S. National Register of Historic Places
- U.S. Historic district
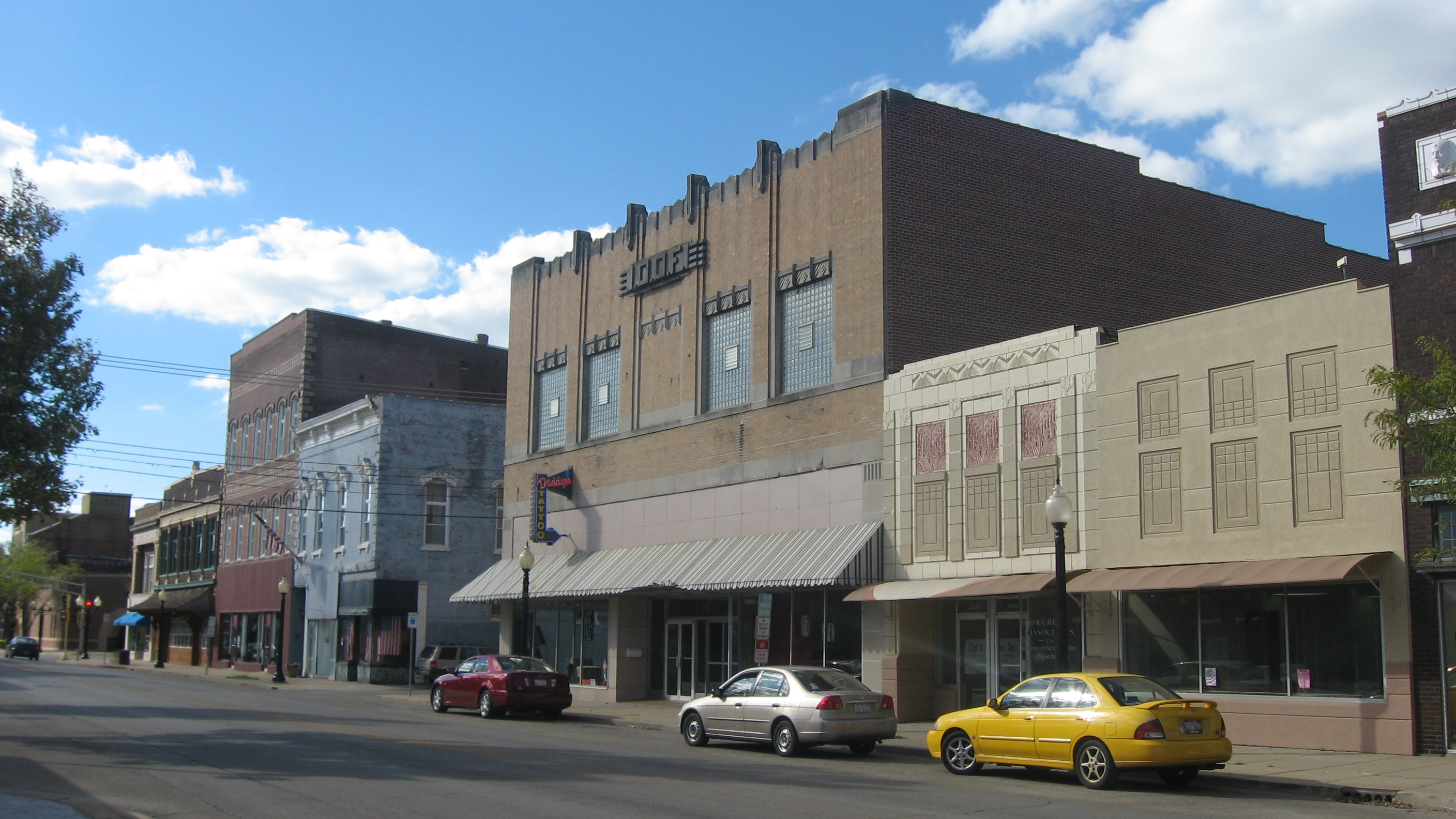

- Location within Illinois Location within the United States
- Location: 126 W. Broadway to 331 E. Broadway
- Coordinates: 38°31′40″N 89°8′5″W
- Area: less than one acre
- NRHP reference No.: 12000060
- Added to NRHP: March 7, 2012

The Centralia Commercial Historic District is a historic commercial district comprising several blocks of Broadway in downtown Centralia, Illinois. The district includes 57 contributing buildings as well as a historic water tower and sign. Centralia's business district developed around the Illinois Central Railroad tracks, as the town was established by and named for the railroad. The earliest buildings in the district date from the 1850s, as the city was platted in 1853. Centralia's first commercial buildings were mainly designed in the Italianate style, which was predominant until the end of the 19th century; the Romanesque Revival style also gained popularity in the 1880s. Around the turn of the century, the Commercial style became the most popular style in the district. The Renaissance Revival and Classical Revival styles can also be seen in buildings from this era, and by the 1930s Art Deco and Modernist architecture became popular.

The district was added to the National Register of Historic Places on March 7, 2012. Two buildings within the district, the Egyptian Revival Sentinel Building and the Classical Revival Elks Lodge, are individually listed in the National Register.
