= Oregonator =

ODE model of autocatalytic reaction

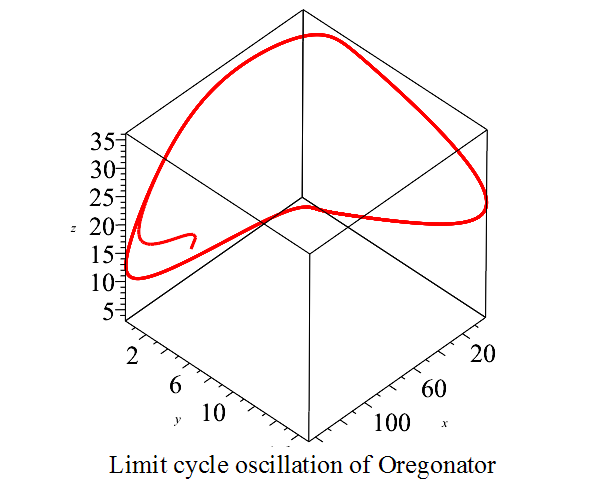
Limit cycle oscillation of Oregonator

The Oregonator is a theoretical model for a type of autocatalytic reaction. The Oregonator for the simple reaction A + B --> P is the simplest realistic model of the chemical dynamics of the oscillatory Belousov–Zhabotinsky reaction. It was created by Richard Field and Richard M. Noyes at the University of Oregon. It is a portmanteau of Oregon and oscillator.

Earlier, the Brusselator model was proposed by Ilya Prigogine and his collaborators at the Free University of Brussels as a portmanteau of Brussels and oscillator.

The Oregonator is a reduced model of the FKN mechanism (developed by Richard Field, Endre Kőrös, and Richard M. Noyes) which still involved 11 reactions and 12 species (21 intermediate species and 18 elementary steps). The Oregonator is characterized by the reactions (Note: The mechanism below as well as the rate equations are from the Scholarpedia article. Some of the stoichiometric coefficients in the original equations were different.)

$$\begin{align}
\text{I} \quad & A+Y \longrightarrow X+P \\[5pt]
\text{II} \quad & X+Y \longrightarrow 2P \\[5pt]
\text{III} \quad & A+X \longrightarrow 2X+2Z \\[5pt]
\text{IV} \quad & 2X \longrightarrow A+P \\[5pt]
\text{V} \quad & B+Z \longrightarrow \frac 1 2 f Y \\[5pt]
& \frac{d [X]}{dt}=  k_I [A] [Y] - k_{II} [X] [Y] + k_{III} [A] [X] - 2k_{IV} [X]^2 \\[5pt]
& \frac{d [Y]}{dt}= -k_I [A] [Y] - k_{II} [X] [Y] + \frac{1}{2}f k_V [B] [Z] \\[5pt]
& \frac{d [Z]}{dt}=  2k_{III} [A] [X] - k_V [B] [Z]
\end{align}$$

== See also ==
- Lotka–Volterra equations
