= Journal of the American Chemical Society =

Weekly peer-reviewed journal

- Discipline: Chemistry
- Language: English
- Edited by: Erick M. Carreira

Publication details
- History: 1879–present
- Publisher: American Chemical Society (United States)
- Frequency: Weekly
- Open access: Hybrid
- Impact factor: 15.6 (2024)

Standard abbreviations
- ISO 4: J. Am. Chem. Soc.

Indexing
- CODEN: JACSAT
- ISSN: 0002-7863 (print); 1520-5126 (web)
- LCCN: 16003159
- OCLC no.: 01226990

Links
- Journal homepage; Online access; Online archive

The Journal of the American Chemical Society (also known as JACS) is a weekly peer-reviewed scientific journal that was established in 1879 by the American Chemical Society. The journal has absorbed two other publications in its history, the Journal of Analytical and Applied Chemistry (July 1893) and the American Chemical Journal (January 1914). It covers all fields of chemistry. Since 2021, the editor-in-chief is Erick M. Carreira (ETH Zurich). In 2014, the journal moved to a hybrid open access publishing model.

== Abstracting and indexing ==
The journal is abstracted and indexed in:

- Biological Abstracts
- BIOSIS Previews
- Chemical Abstracts Service
- Current Chemical Reactions
- Current Contents/Life Sciences
- Current Contents/Physical, Chemical & Earth Sciences
- EBSCO databases
- Index Chemicus
- Index Medicus/MEDLINE/PubMed
- ProQuest databases
- Science Citation Index Expanded
- Scopus

According to the Journal Citation Reports, the journal has a 2024 impact factor of 15.6. The journal has a 2026 impact factor of 16.6.

== Editors-in-chief ==
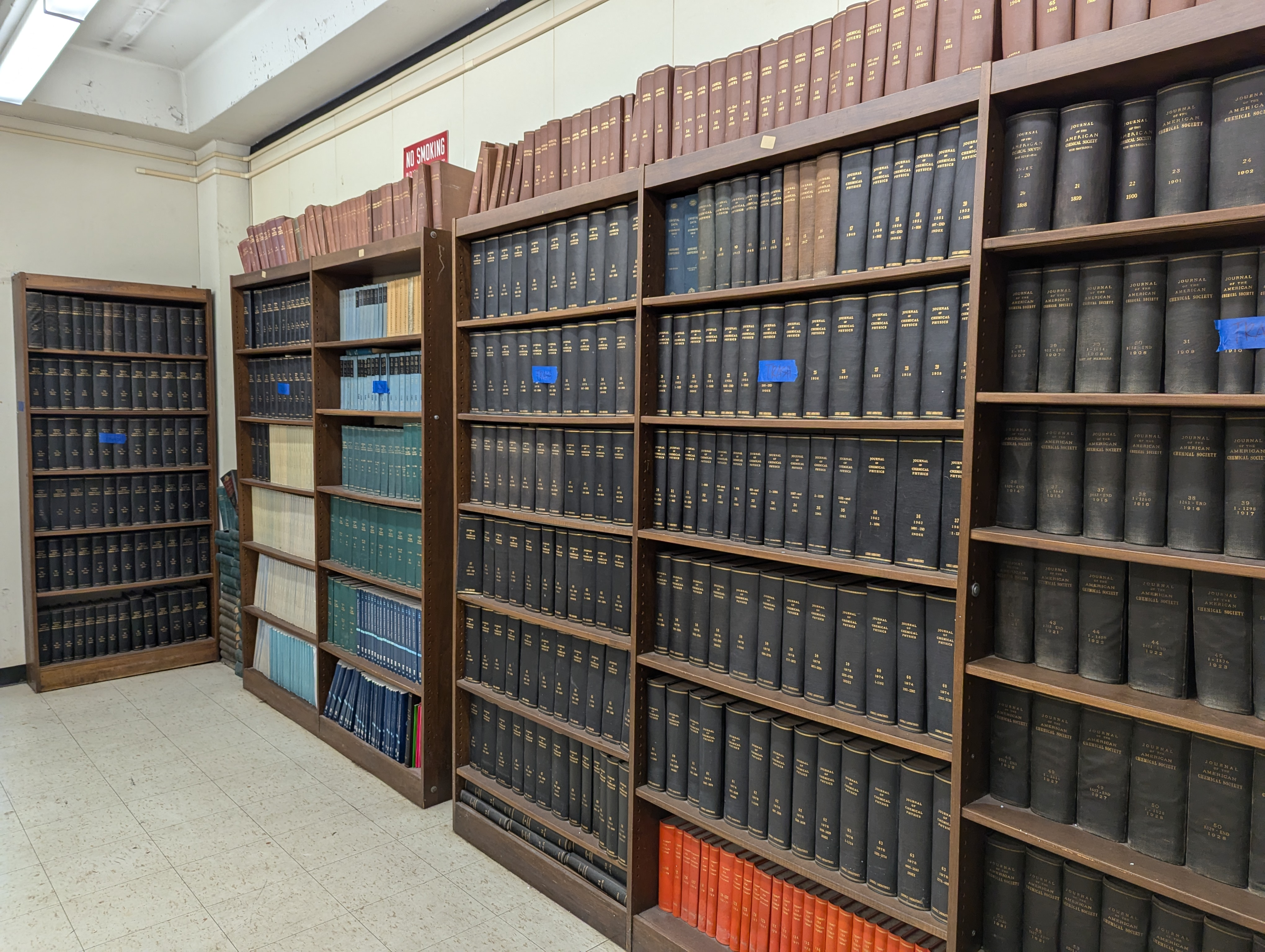
The long history of JACS has resulted in many physical volumes.

The following people are or have been editor-in-chief:

- 1879–1880 – Hermann Endemann
- 1880–1881 – Gideon E. Moore
- 1881–1882 – Hermann Endemann
- 1882–1883 – Editorial Committee
- 1884–1892 – Abram A. Breneman
- 1893–1901 – Edward Hart
- 1902–1917 – William A. Noyes Sr.
- 1918–1949 – Arthur B. Lamb
- 1950–1962 – W. Albert Noyes Jr.
- 1963–1969 – Marshall D. Gates Jr.
- 1969–1975 – Martin Stiles
- 1975–1981 – Cheves Walling
- 1982–2001 – Allen J. Bard
- 2002–2020 – Peter J. Stang
- since 2021 – Erick M. Carreira
