= Cheves Walling =

American organic chemist (1916–2007)

Cheves Walling (1916 – June 18, 2007) was an American organic chemist, having been a Distinguished Professor Emeritus at and also the former Editor-in-Chief of Journal of the American Chemical Society. He was also a Fellow of the National Academy of Sciences and American Academy of Arts & Sciences.
