= H. Pierre Noyes =

American theoretical physicist (1923-2016)

- Born: Henry Pierre Noyes; December 10, 1923; Paris, France
- Died: September 30, 2016 (aged 92); Stanford, California, U.S.
- Citizenship: United States
- Education: Harvard University; University of California, Berkeley
- Known for: Three-body problem; bit-string physics; founding director of the SLAC Theory Group
- Spouse: Mary Noyes
- Awards: Fulbright Scholarship; Alexander von Humboldt U.S. Senior Scientist Award (1979)
- Scientific career
- Fields: Theoretical physics, nuclear physics, particle physics
- Workplaces: University of Rochester; Lawrence Livermore National Laboratory; Stanford University; SLAC National Accelerator Laboratory
- Doctoral advisor: Geoffrey Chew
- Other academic advisors: Robert Serber

Henry Pierre Noyes (December 10, 1923 - September 30, 2016) was an American theoretical physicist at Stanford University and the SLAC National Accelerator Laboratory. He was the first director of the SLAC Theory Group, and his research included the relativistic few-body problem, nuclear and particle physics, and later work outside mainstream theoretical physics including bit-string physics. He also became known as an opponent of nuclear weapons research and of the Vietnam War.

== Early life and family ==
Noyes was born in Paris, France, on December 10, 1923, while his father, the American chemist William A. Noyes, was on sabbatical from the University of Illinois. His mother was Katharine Howarth Macy, daughter of Jesse Macy. His older half-brother William Albert Noyes Jr. and brother Richard M. Noyes were also chemists.

Noyes met Mary, his future wife, at a Valentine's Day dance in Berkeley in 1947. They were married for almost 69 years and had three children, David, Alan and Katia. Mary Noyes died six weeks after him.

== Education and military service ==
Noyes graduated from Harvard University in 1943 with a degree in physics. At Harvard his roommate was Thomas Kuhn, and Noyes later read an early draft of Kuhn's The Structure of Scientific Revolutions. After graduating, he spent a year at the MIT Radiation Laboratory and then served for two years in the United States Navy as an aviation electronics technician's mate, working on radar technology.

He earned a Ph.D. in theoretical physics from the University of California, Berkeley in 1950. His doctoral adviser was Geoffrey Chew, and his work was carried out under the direction of Robert Serber. After completing the doctorate, he spent a postdoctoral year as a Fulbright Scholar at the University of Birmingham in England.

== Career ==
Noyes worked at the University of Rochester as a postdoctoral fellow and assistant professor of physics from 1952 to 1955. During this period he also worked on the classified Project Matterhorn fusion program at Princeton University.

In 1955 he joined the Theoretical Division of what became the Lawrence Livermore National Laboratory, working under Edward Teller and, to a lesser extent, Ernest Lawrence. From 1956 to 1962 he led Livermore's General Research Group, where his work included theoretical computations connected with fusion and nuclear weapons research. In 1957 and 1958 he was a Leverhulme Lecturer in the Experimental Physics Department of the University of Liverpool. He also consulted for Project Orion at General Atomics after an invitation from Freeman Dyson. In 1961 he was AVCO visiting professor at Cornell University.

In 1962 Noyes joined Stanford as an associate professor and became the first director of the Theory Group at the Stanford Linear Accelerator Center, later SLAC National Accelerator Laboratory. He became a full professor in 1967 and professor emeritus in 2000. Noyes served as associate editor of the Annual Review of Nuclear Science from 1962 to 1977.

== Research ==
Noyes's mainstream research focused on high-energy subatomic particle interactions, especially the quantum mechanical three-body problem and other few-body problems in nuclear and particle physics. In 1979 he received the Alexander von Humboldt U.S. Senior Scientist Award, primarily for his work on the quantum mechanical three-body problem for strongly interacting particles.

Some of Noyes's later work was outside the mainstream of theoretical physics. He helped develop bit-string physics, described in the Stanford obituary as a finite, discrete computational model using dimensionless coupling constants as fundamental observables. Stanford also described him as among the first physicists to propose that antimatter experiences antigravity.

In 1979 Noyes co-founded the Alternative Natural Philosophy Association (ANPA) at Cambridge University with John Amson, Ted Bastin, Clive W. Kilmister and A. Frederick Parker-Rhodes. He served as ANPA president from 1979 to 1987. In 1984, with David McGoveran, he established ANPA West at Stanford. Around 1980 he also founded the Light Hearted Philosophy Group at Stanford.

== Antiwar activism ==
Noyes became an outspoken opponent of nuclear weapons within the physics community. According to Physics Today, he was influenced in part by a family background with Quaker connections and became disenchanted with nuclear-weapons research before moving to Stanford. At SLAC he refused defense funding for his own research and helped establish the right to do so within the laboratory.

On January 20, 1970, Noyes and others filed a lawsuit against President Richard Nixon challenging the legality of the Vietnam War. He also terminated his military security clearances and stopped sending preprints to organizations involved in military research. The lawsuit was dropped after Nixon resigned. In the late 1970s Noyes also opposed American military involvement in Iran and visited Tehran as an independent observer at an Iranian government trial of political prisoners, later calling the proceedings a fraud.

== Honors ==
- Fulbright Scholarship, University of Birmingham, 1950-1951
- Leverhulme Lecturer, University of Liverpool, 1957-1958
- Alexander von Humboldt U.S. Senior Scientist Award, 1979
- Scientific Essays in Honor of H Pierre Noyes on the Occasion of His 90th Birthday, a 2014 festschrift edited by John C. Amson and Louis Kauffman.

== Selected publications ==
- Noyes, H. Pierre; Wong, David Y. (1959). "Modification of the Effective-Range Formula for Nucleon-Nucleon Scattering". Physical Review Letters. 3 (4): 191–193. Bibcode:1959PhRvL...3..191N. doi:10.1103/PhysRevLett.3.191.
- Noyes, H. Pierre (1965). "New Nonsingular Integral Equation for Two-Particle Scattering". Physical Review Letters. 15 (12): 538–540. Bibcode:1965PhRvL..15..538N. doi:10.1103/PhysRevLett.15.538. OSTI 1444235.
- Noyes, H. Pierre (1972). "Comment on the Exterior-Interior Separation in the Three-Body Problem". Physical Review D. 5 (6): 1547–1551. Bibcode:1972PhRvD...5.1547N. doi:10.1103/PhysRevD.5.1547.
- Noyes, H. P. (February 17–19, 1996). Are Partons Confined Tachyons?. 12th Annual Western Chapter of the Alternative Natural Philosophy Association Meeting. Stanford, California. OSTI 219371.
