= Produce Terminal Cold Storage Company Building =

- U.S. National Register of Historic Places
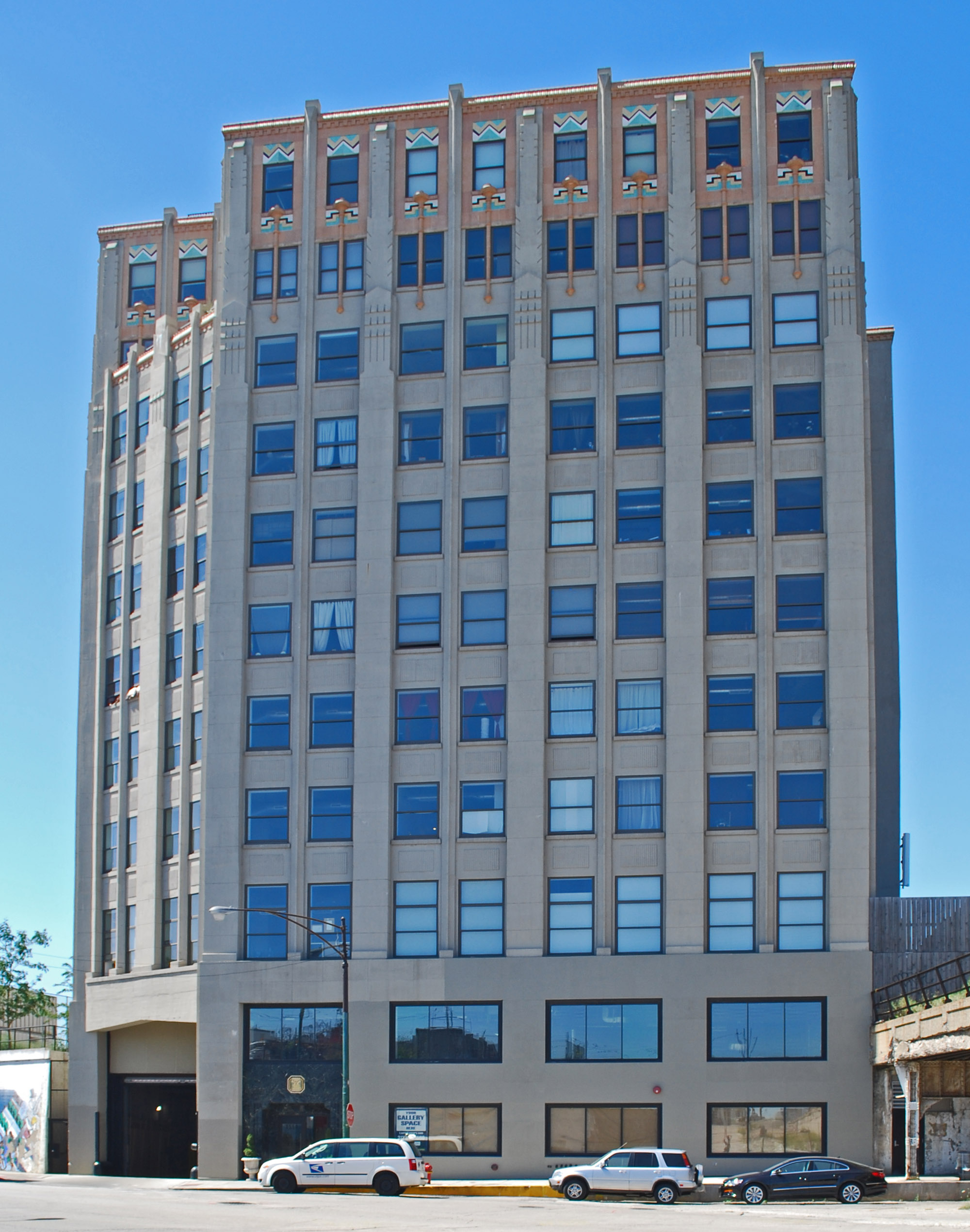
- Location: 1550 South Blue Island Ave., Chicago, Illinois
- Coordinates: 41°51′38″N 87°39′35″W
- Area: 1.5 acres (0.61 ha)
- Built: 1928-29
- Architect: Henschien, H. Peter; McLaren, Robert J.
- Architectural style: Art Deco
- NRHP reference No.: 03000538
- Added to NRHP: June 22, 2003

The Produce Terminal Cold Storage Company Building is a historic refrigerated warehouse at 1550 South Blue Island Avenue in the Near West Side neighborhood of Chicago, Illinois. Built in 1928–29, the warehouse was the largest cold storage facility in Chicago when it opened. As Chicago was a major shipping and transportation hub, refrigerated storage played a key role in preserving perishable goods so they could be sold year-round. Architects H. Peter Henschien, a designer of refrigerated facilities, and Robert J. McLaren designed the Art Deco building. The top two stories of the eleven-story building feature extensive terra cotta and tile ornamentation, including chevrons, Egyptian-inspired colonettes, and a dentillated cornice with cymatium molding. In addition to its extensive refrigerated space, the interior plan also included processing and office space, improving efficiency and lowering costs for the building's tenants.

The building was added to the National Register of Historic Places on June 22, 2003.
