= Union Park Hotel =

- U.S. National Register of Historic Places
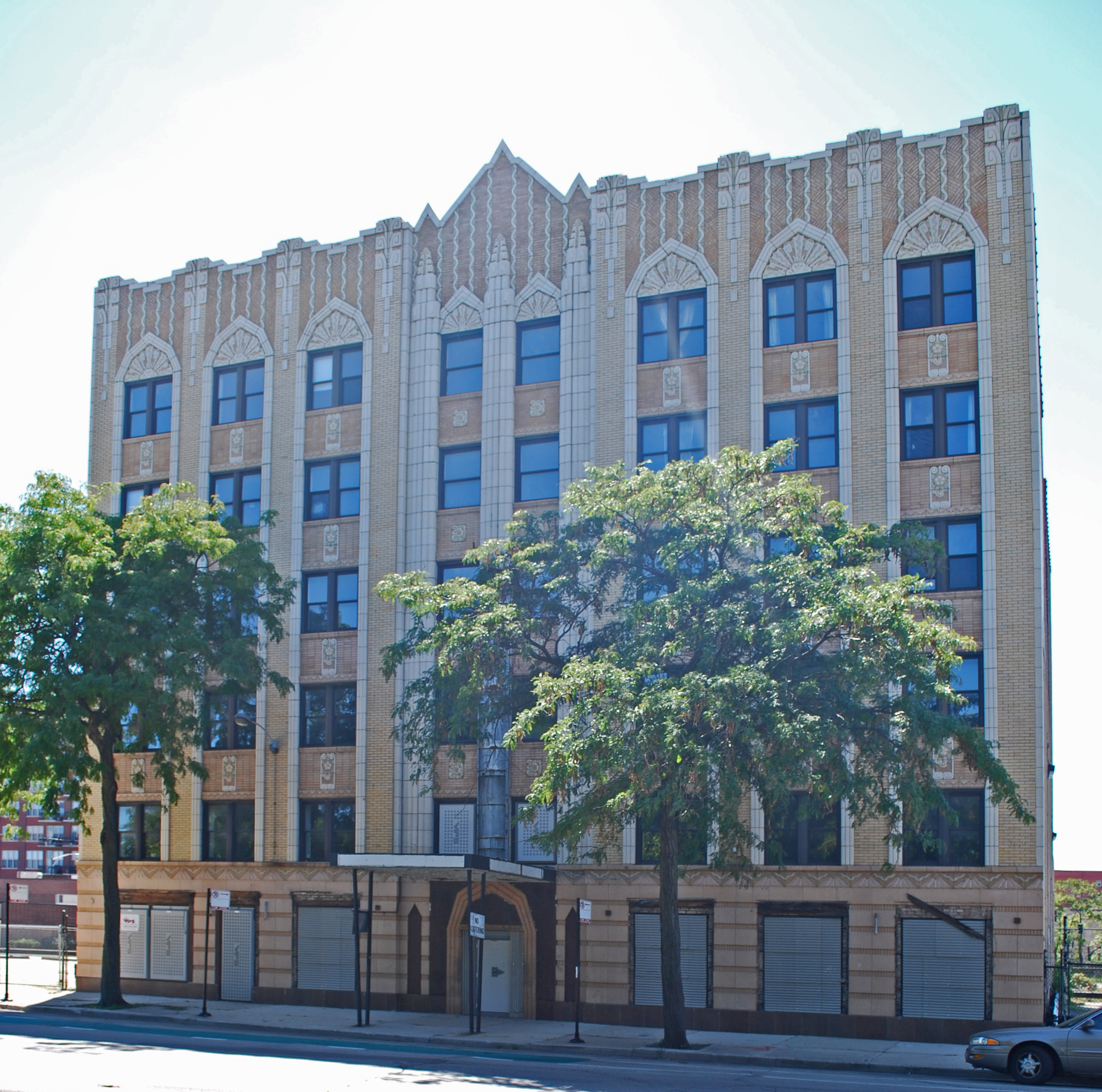
- Location: 1519-1521 W Warren Blvd, Chicago, Illinois
- Coordinates: 41°52′56″N 87°39′58″W
- Area: less than one acre
- Built: 1929-30
- Built by: Klein, Arthur A. & Co.
- Architects: Comm, Benjamin Albert
- Architectural style: Art Deco
- NRHP reference No.: 10000309
- Added to NRHP: June 7, 2010

The Union Park Hotel (formerly the Viceroy Hotel) is a historic hotel building located at 1519-1521 W. Warren Boulevard in Chicago, Illinois. The building was built in 1929–30 as an apartment hotel, a common type of housing for Chicago laborers in the 1920s. The hotel's Art Deco design reflects the national popularity of the style in the 1920s. The building's piers give it a vertical emphasis common to Art Deco works, and its decorative elements reflect the style's geometric focus. The colorful brick and terra cotta facade of the building is also characteristic of Art Deco buildings of the late 1920s, though color is seldom used extensively in Chicago's other Art Deco buildings.

The building was added to the National Register of Historic Places on June 7, 2010.
