= Jesse Macy =

American political scientist and historian

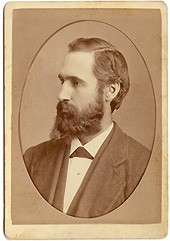
- Portrait of Macy
- Born: June 21, 1842; Indiana
- Died: November 2, 1919 (aged 77); Grinnell, Iowa
- Education: Bachelor of Arts, Grinnell College, 1870; Ph.D., Johns Hopkins University, 1884
- Occupations: Political scientist, historian

Jesse Macy (June 21, 1842 – November 2, 1919) was an American political scientist and historian of the late 19th and early 20th century, specializing in the history of American political parties, party systems, and the Civil War. He spent most of his professional career at his alma mater, Grinnell College.

== Life ==
Jesse Macy, the thirteenth of fourteen children, was born to Quaker parents in Indiana, but the family moved to central Iowa in 1856 and started farming outside Lynnville, near the newly founded town of Grinnell. At age 17, he entered Iowa College, now Grinnell College. During the Civil War, he served in the Union army and he did not graduate until after the war, earning an A.B. in 1870.

During the 1870s, Macy started what would become a long-term correspondence with James Bryce, a noted British jurist and politician. In 1884, he completed his Ph.D. at Johns Hopkins University. The next year, he returned to the Midwest to take a professorship at Iowa College. For the next forty-two years, Macy taught history and political science at the college.

In the 1890s, Macy defended radical aspects of the burgeoning social gospel taught at Iowa College by professor of Applied Christianity George Herron and college president George A. Gates. Macy supported liberal education in a newspaper article, saying:

Suppose some emissary of darkness had spied out our liberty and had arraigned Iowa College before the public as a place where young people were taught the dangerous doctrine of evolution. It may be that at so early a date the young professors would have been sent adrift and the public would have been assured that Iowa College was a place where only safe opinions were allowed! That is a place where only imbeciles and hypocrites are educated.

He was also a leading author of political science textbooks. Macy's 1896 manual on American civil government, Our Government. How It Grew, What It Does, And How it Does It, was an influential primer for university students and his 1897 The English Constitution: A Commentary on its Nature and Growth was acclaimed for providing the necessary foundation in English law to correctly understand American law.

In his 1904 work Party Organization and Machinery Macy wrote, "While our party system is without Old World models, it is strikingly in harmony with our other forms of political activity...." and "Various references to party and faction found in The Federalist illustrate the type of American ideas which prevailed before the American party system appeared" (pp. xiv-xvi). The work also included a whole chapter entitled "Effect of the City upon the Party System".

In 1911, Grinnell awarded Macy an honorary degree of Doctor of Laws.

After retiring in 1912, Macy traveled widely and continued writing until his death in 1919.

In February 2008, Grinnell's board of trustees voted to name one of the college office buildings "Jesse Macy House" in memory of the long-serving professor. The building, at 1205 Park St., houses a number of interdisciplinary centers, including the Center for Peace Studies and the Rosenfield Program.

Macy's descendants include SLAC physicist H. Pierre Noyes.

== Publications ==
- Institutional Beginnings in a Western State (1884), ISBN 978-1-4047-3908-6.
- Our Government. How It Grew, What It Does, And How it Does It (1886, 1890). Full text of 1901 edition
- The English Constitution: A Commentary on its Nature and Growth (1897). Full text
- Political Parties in the United States, 1846–1861 (1900, reprinted 1974). Full text
- Party Organization and Machinery (1904). Full text of 1912 edition
- The Anti-Slavery Crusade: a Chronicle of the Gathering Storm (1919). Full text

== Sources ==
- Jesse Macy: An Autobiography / edited and arranged by his daughter, Katharine Macy Noyes. Springfield, Ill. : C.C. Thomas, 1933.
