= Liberty Theater (Murphysboro, Illinois) =

- U.S. National Register of Historic Places
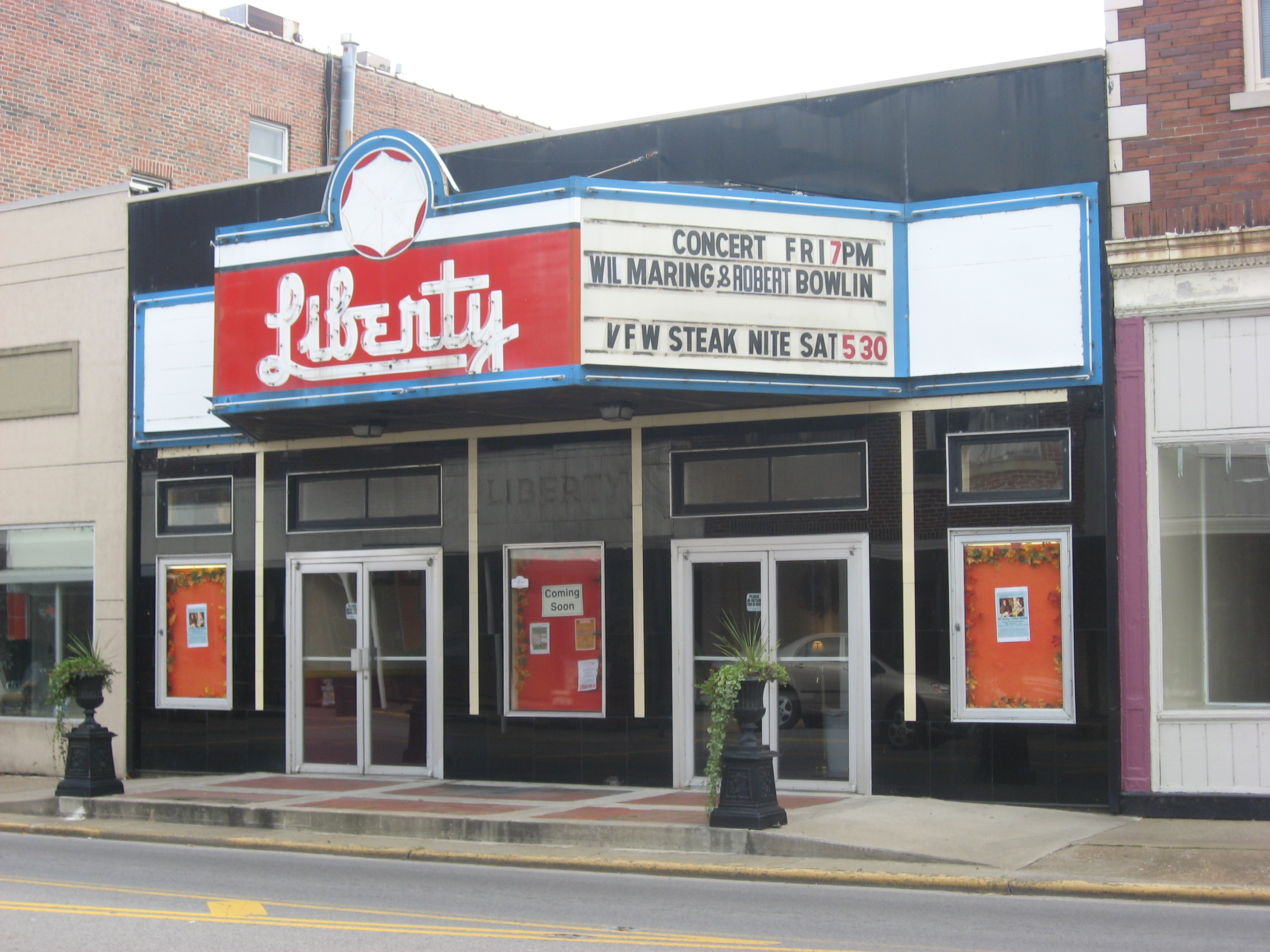

- Location within Illinois Location within the United States
- Location: 1333 Walnut St., Murphysboro, Illinois
- Coordinates: 37°45′51″N 89°20′16″W
- Built: 1913
- NRHP reference No.: 12000322
- Added to NRHP: June 13, 2012

Liberty Theater is a historic movie theater located at 1333 Walnut St. in Murphysboro, Illinois. Built in 1913 as the Tilford Theatre, the theater was one of the first five movie theaters in Murphysboro. The theater's name was changed in 1918 during a wave of patriotism inspired by World War I. In 1938, the theater was remodeled in the Art Deco style. During the remodeling, the theater's neon marquee was installed and the building's exterior walls were faced with black vitrolite. The theater continued to show films until 1998 and was the last of the original five theaters to close. After a renovation in 2002, the theater was reopened by a not-for-profit group; it currently hosts community events and is available for rent.

The theater was added to the National Register of Historic Places on June 13, 2012.
