= Windsor Beach Apartments =

Apartment building in Chicago, Illinois

- South Shore Beach Apartments
- U.S. National Register of Historic Places
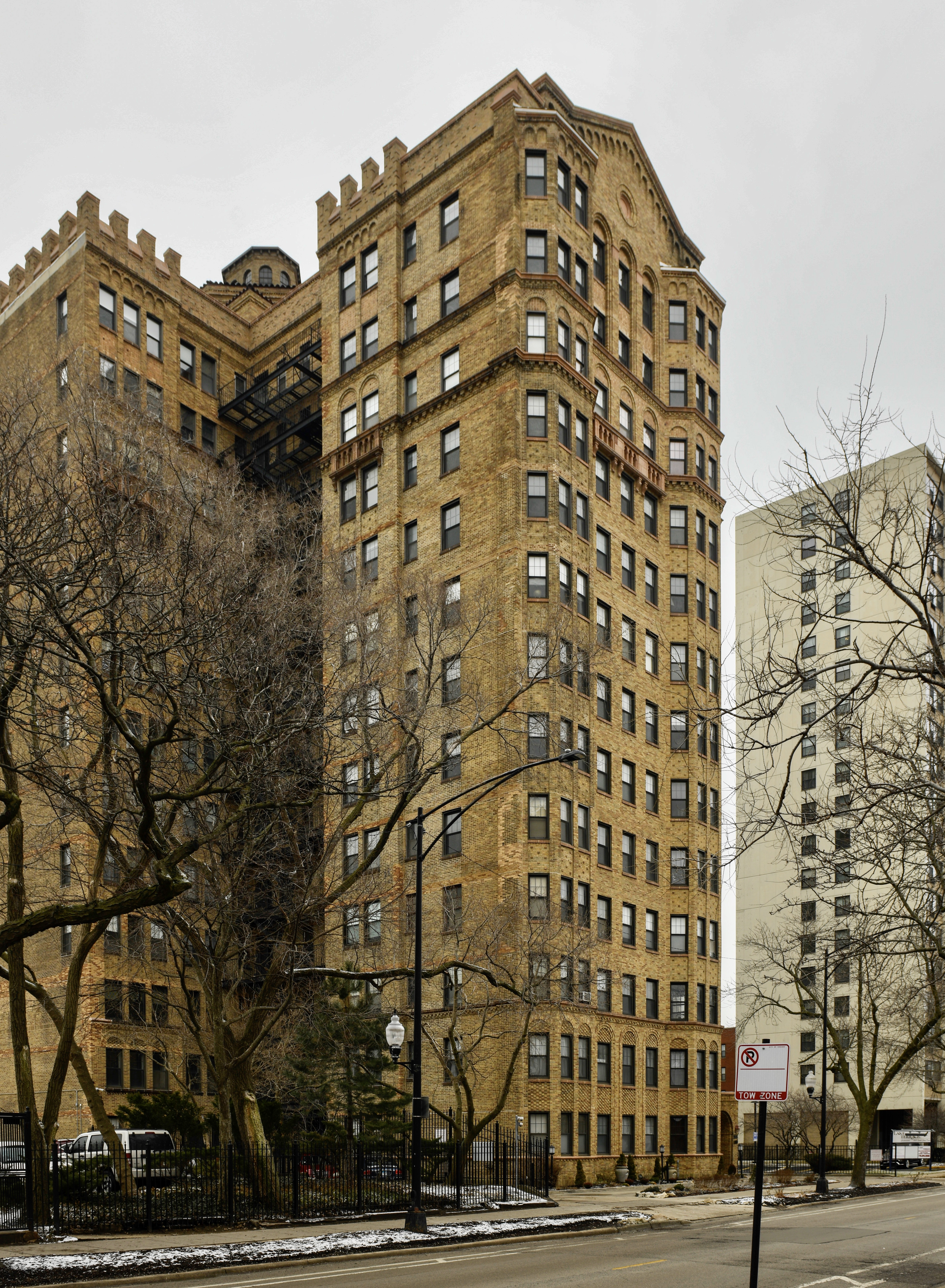

- Location within Chicago metropolitan area Location within Illinois Location within the United States
- Location: 7321 S. Shore Dr., Chicago, Illinois
- Coordinates: 41°45′50″N 87°33′34″W
- Area: 0.5 acres (0.20 ha)
- Built: 1927-28
- Architect: De Golyer, Robert S.
- Architectural style: Art Deco/Moderne
- NRHP reference No.: 78001131
- Added to NRHP: June 9, 1978

The Windsor Beach Apartments, historically known as the South Shore Beach Apartments, is a historic apartment building in the South Shore neighborhood of Chicago, Illinois. The building was constructed in 1927–28, shortly before the Great Depression ended the initial wave of apartment construction in Chicago. Its lakefront location and the relative seclusion of its apartments, with no more than eight per floor, catered to well-off residents. Architect Robert S. De Goyler designed the building; his design blends Moorish elements with the newly popular Art Deco and Moderne styles. The thirteen-story building features patterned brickwork, an arched entrance path, and projecting window bays on its front.

The building was added to the National Register of Historic Places on June 9, 1978.
