= Marion Veterans Affairs Medical Center =

- Marion Veterans Administration Hospital Historic District
- U.S. National Register of Historic Places
- U.S. Historic district
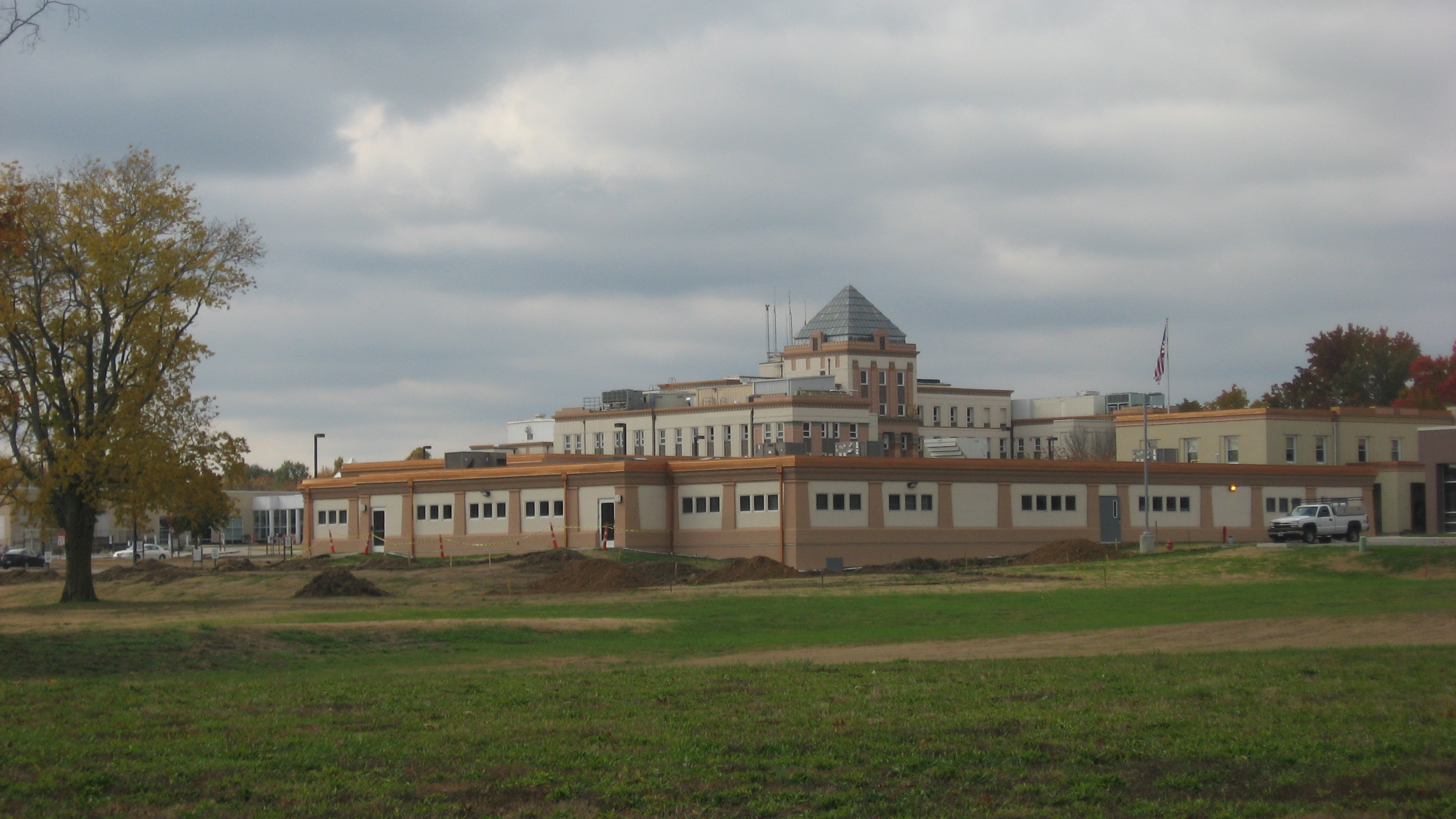

- Location within Illinois Location within the United States
- Location: 2401 W. Main St. Marion, Illinois
- Coordinates: 37°43′28″N 88°57′17″W
- Built: 1939-41
- Architectural style: Egyptian Revival
- NRHP reference No.: 12001146
- Added to NRHP: January 9, 2013

Marion Veterans Affairs Medical Center, also known as Marion Veterans Administration Hospital, is a Veterans Affairs hospital in Marion, Illinois. The hospital is responsible for providing healthcare to U.S. military veterans in Southern Illinois and neighboring states. The hospital was built in 1939-41 following a local campaign for a veterans' hospital in Southern Illinois. It was part of the second generation of VA hospitals in the U.S., which were built from 1920 to 1950. The Marion VA Hospital is the only VA hospital built during this period which was designed in the Egyptian Revival style, which was chosen to recognize the region's nickname of "Little Egypt"; elements of the style used in the building include its pyramidal roof, projecting pavilion, and smooth outer walls with multicolored ornamentation.

The hospital was added to the National Register of Historic Places on January 9, 2013, as the Marion Veterans Administration Hospital Historic District.
