= Centralia Elks Lodge =

- The Centralia Elk's Lodge
- Formerly listed on the U.S. National Register of Historic Places
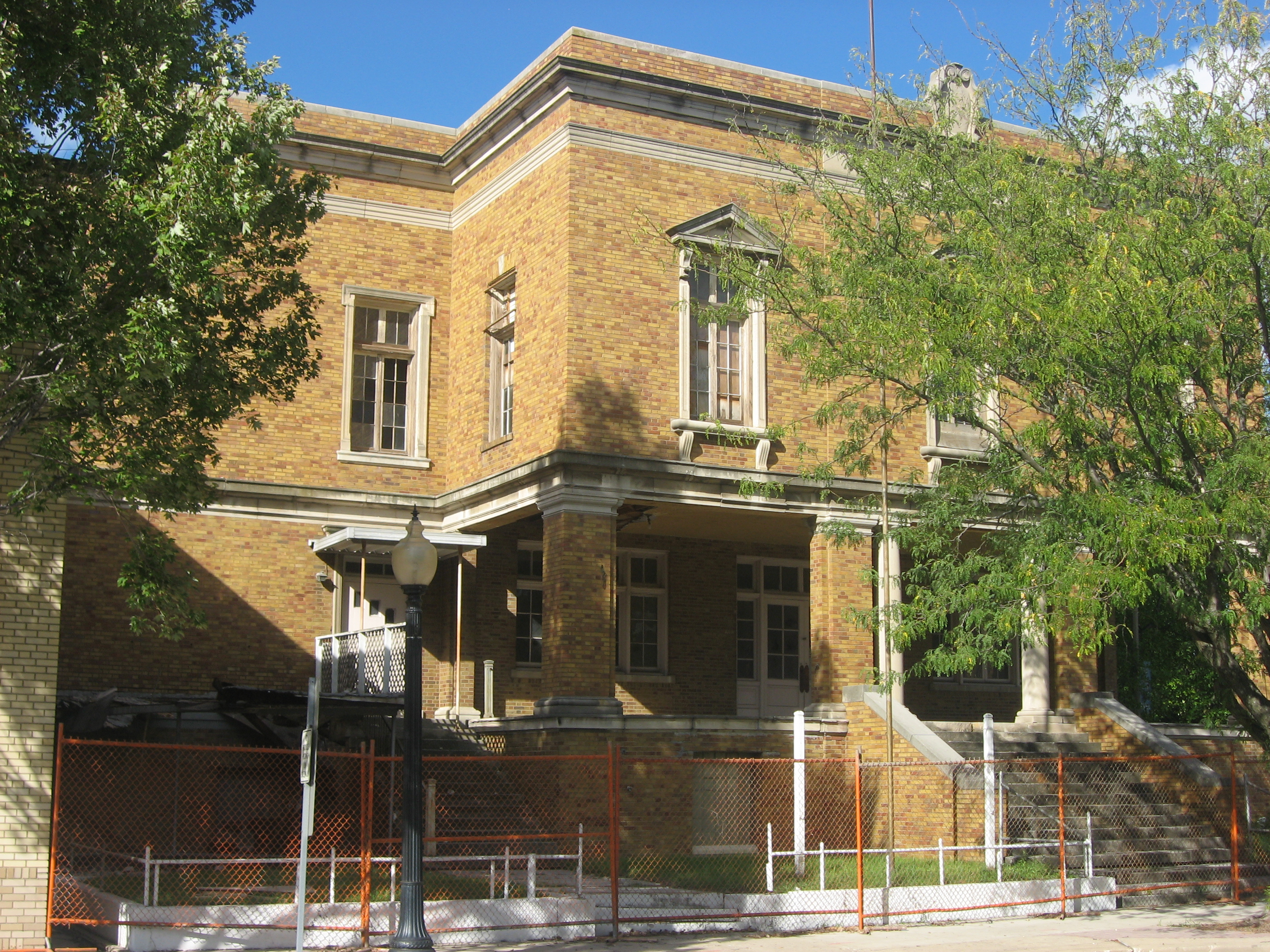

- Location within Illinois Location within the United States
- Location: 328 E. Broadway, Centralia, Illinois
- Coordinates: 38°31′39″N 89°7′53″W
- Area: less than one acre
- Built: c. 1930
- Architectural style: Classical Revival
- NRHP reference No.: 08001171

Significant dates
- Added to NRHP: November 7, 2011
- Removed from NRHP: January 2, 2020

The Centralia Elks Lodge was a historic building located at 328 E. Broadway in Centralia, Illinois. The Classical Revival building was constructed between 1929 and 1931 for Centralia Lodge 493, the city's chapter of the Benevolent and Protective Order of Elks. The entrance to the building was flanked by Ionic columns. The second-story windows on the front facade were topped with limestone pediments and segmented arches; the windowsills feature decorative brackets. Limestone cornices top both stories of the building, and a cartouche bordered by scrolls sat on the roofline above the central front window.

In 1938-39, the Elks sold the building to a group of local businessmen. The businessmen then leased the building to the Shell Oil Company, and the building became known as the Petroleum Building; around this time, a bowling alley opened in the basement. In 1946, the Centralia chapter of the Veterans of Foreign Wars purchased the building and used the second floor as a meeting hall. A fire in 1951 caused the bowling alley to close; however, the VFW continued to use the building.

The building was added to the National Register of Historic Places on November 7, 2011, and was delisted in 2020.
