= Mr. Robert Silhan House =

Historic house in Illinois, United States

- U.S. National Register of Historic Places
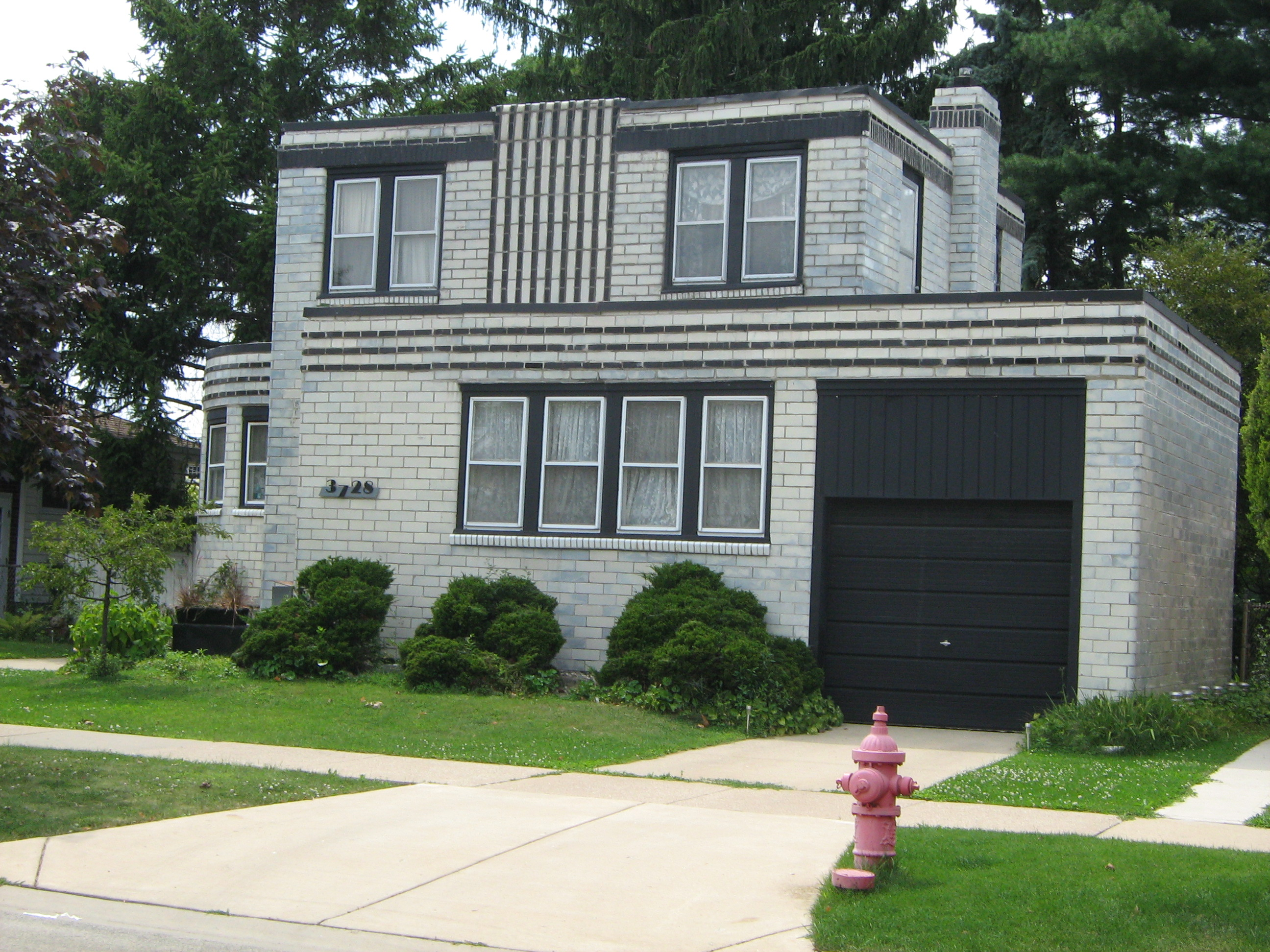

- Location within Illinois Location within the United States
- Location: 3728 S. Cuyler Ave., Berwyn, Illinois
- Coordinates: 41°49′28″N 87°46′53″W
- Area: less than one acre
- Built: c. 1937
- Built by: Ribert Silhan, Robert Silhan Jr.
- Architect: Robert Silhan
- Architectural style: Moderne
- NRHP reference No.: 07000062
- Added to NRHP: February 20, 2007

The Mr. Robert Silhan House is a small-scale Streamline Moderne house in Berwyn, Illinois, United States. Thought to be constructed around 1937, it was inspired by buildings at the Century of Progress World's Fair.

== History ==
Katherine Silhan acquired a plot of land as an investment in Berwyn, Illinois, in 1922. At the time, Berwyn was undergoing a building boom coinciding with the Roaring Twenties. The lot was not yet connected to a road at the time of purchase, so little development initially occurred on the block. Katherine and Jerry Silhan subdivided their property into four lots in 1929. The Silhans kept one of these lots in their possession.

The date of construction is unknown. Robert and Katherine Silhan obtained a mortgage in 1934, and it is thought that this was to finance house construction. The Silhans sold their former house on Harvey Avenue on September 30, 1937, so it is thought that the Cuyler Avenue house was completed at some point around then. It was certainly constructed by 1944.

Robert Jaroslav Silhan was born in Radnice, Czechoslovakia, in 1879. He met his wife Katherine there, and they immigrated to the United States in 1901. They were wed two years later. Silhan worked in a sash and door factory and built cabinets as a side job. He was active in civic affairs, serving as President of the Berwyn Improvement Association and the Social Club Radnice of Berwyn.

Ownership of the house was passed to their son Jerry at some point. Jerry Silhan sold the house outside of the family in 1977. On February 20, 2007, the house was recognized by the National Park Service with a listing on the National Register of Historic Places.
