= Noyes Laboratory of Chemistry =

Chemistry laboratory at the University of Illinois at Urbana–Champaign

Coordinates: 40.1085°N 88.2261°W

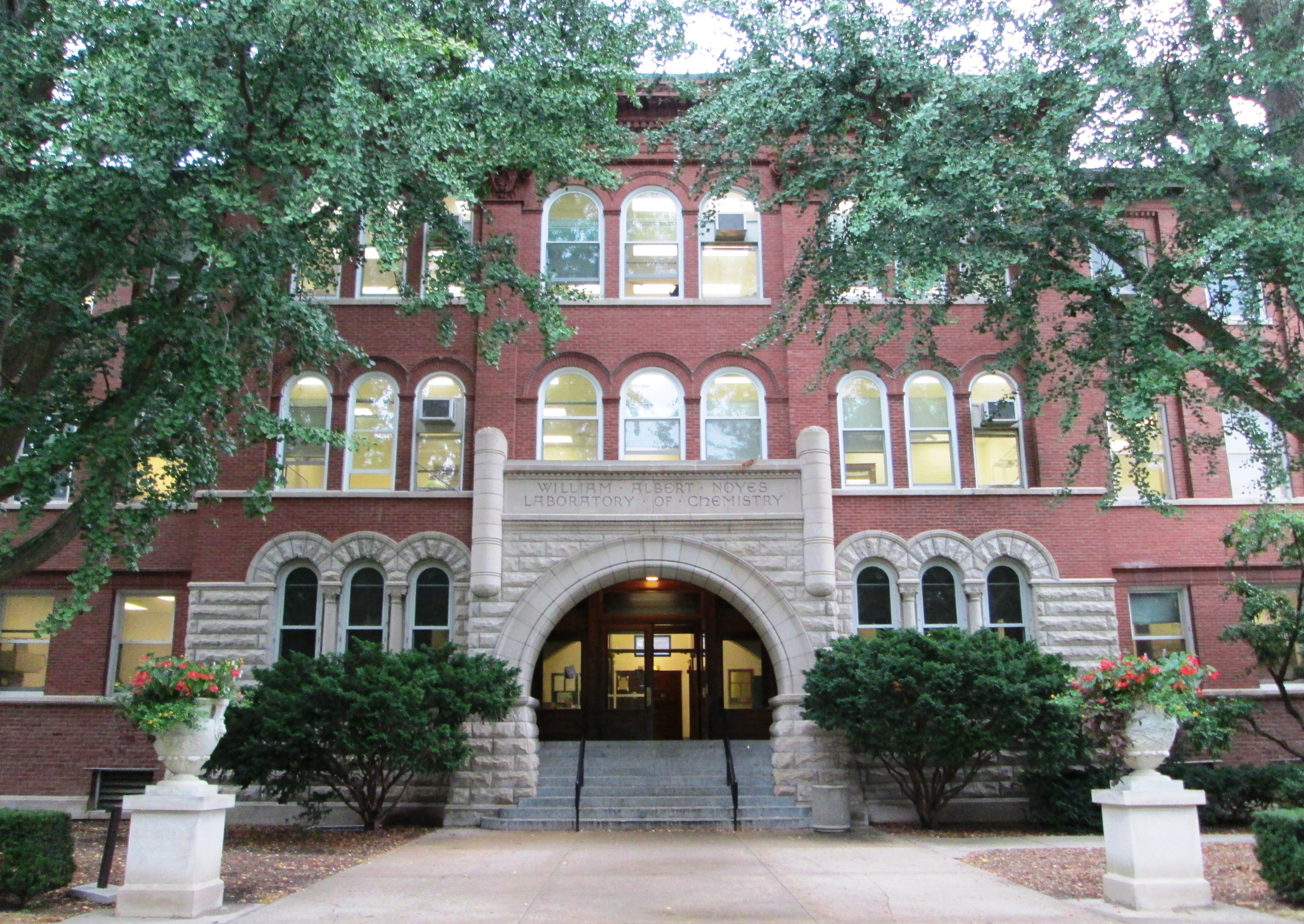
The main facade and entrance to the Noyes Lab

The William Albert Noyes Laboratory of Chemistry, located on the campus of the University of Illinois Urbana-Champaign at 505 S. Mathews Avenue in Urbana, Illinois, United States, was built in 1902 as the "New Chemical Laboratory", and was designed by Nelson Strong Spencer in the Richardsonian Romanesque style. Founded in 1867, the Chemistry Department was the first department of the university to move into its own building in 1878. When the department outgrew that building, department head Arthur W. Palmer convinced the state legislature to build a new lab, with 77,884 square feet of usable space, at a cost of under $100,000.

Ten years later, when more space was needed, the east wing—with 86,396 square feet of additional space—was built in 1915–16 at the cost of $250,000. The building then housed the largest chemistry department in the United States at the time. At various times, the buildings also housed the departments of Biochemistry, Chemical Engineering and Bacteriology, as well as the Illinois Water Survey.

In 1939 the building was dedicated in honor of the influential UI chemist William A. Noyes. It was designated a National Historic Chemical Landmark by the American Chemical Society in 2002, in recognition of the many contributions to the chemical sciences that have been made there over the last 100 years.

In 1930, James McLaren White's Chemistry Annex Building was completed, and connected to the Noyes Lab Building underground. It added 39,000 square feet at the cost of $335,000, and in 1951 the East Chemistry Annex was added to the complex, at the cost of $5.9 million.
