= Wholesale Florists Exchange =

- U.S. National Register of Historic Places
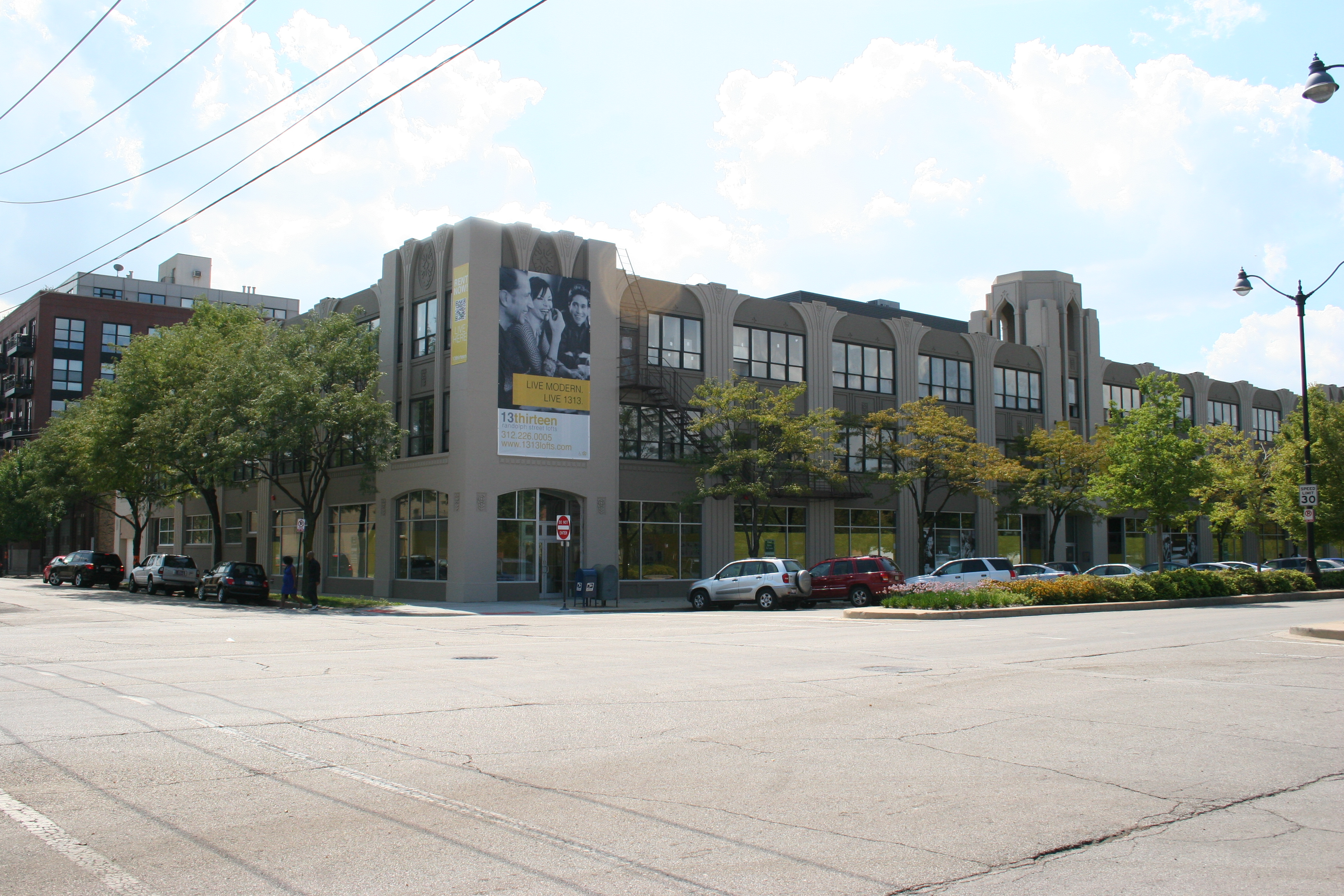

- Location within Chicago metropolitan area Location within Illinois Location within the United States
- Location: 1313 W. Randolph St., Chicago, Illinois
- Coordinates: 41°53′03″N 87°39′34″W
- Area: less than one acre
- Built: 1927
- Architect: Fox & Fox
- Architectural style: Art Deco
- NRHP reference No.: 11000849
- Added to NRHP: November 22, 2011

The Wholesale Florists Exchange is a historic building at 1313 W. Randolph Street in the Near West Side neighborhood of Chicago, Illinois. The building was constructed in 1927 to serve as a central market for several of Chicago's largest florists. Before the building opened, the city's floral industry was based at a crowded market on Wabash Street that lacked proper facilities for processing flowers. The new building, designed by architecture firm Fox & Fox, included amenities such as modern refrigeration and improved elevators and loading areas to facilitate efficient transport of flowers. It also featured an Art Deco design that incorporated floral themes, such as the lotuses atop its fluted concrete piers. The building served as the nexus of Chicago's floral industry until the 1950s, when the industry largely left Chicago for warmer regions of the country.

The building was added to the National Register of Historic Places on November 22, 2011.
