= Fox River Pavilion =

- St. Charles Hospital
- U.S. National Register of Historic Places
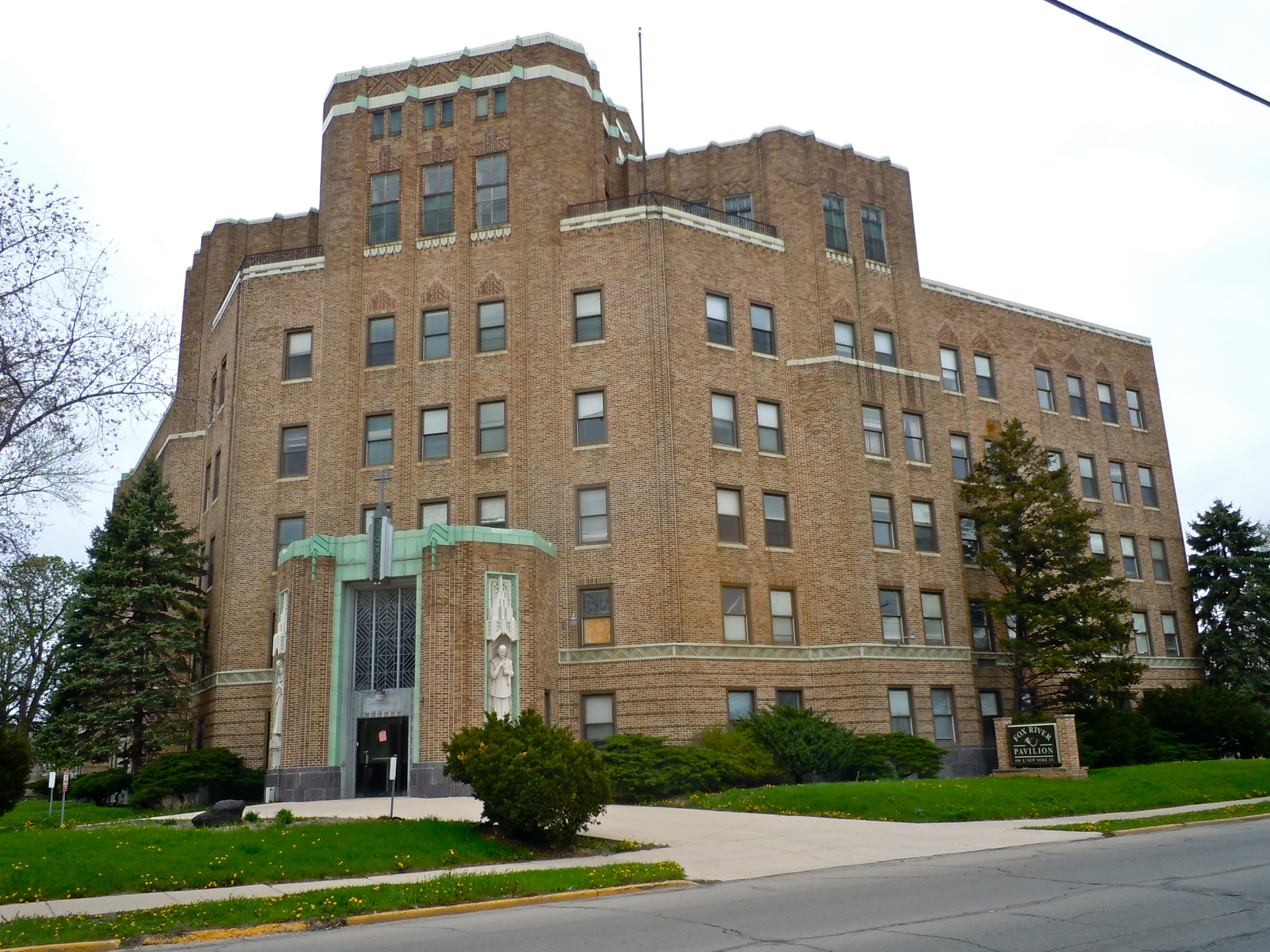
- Fox River Pavilion in 2011

- Location within Illinois Location within the United States
- Location: 400 E New York St. Aurora, Kane County, Illinois, United States
- Coordinates: 41°45′25″N 88°18′26″W
- Built: 1932
- Architect: Wybe J. Van der Meer
- Architectural style: Art Deco
- NRHP reference No.: 10000312
- Added to NRHP: June 7, 2010

The Fox River Pavilion, formerly the St. Charles Hospital, is a historical building in Aurora, Illinois. The Art Deco building was originally a hospital and functioned as a nursing home and sanatorium until approximately April 2010, when the property was vacated. It was added to the National Register of Historic Places on June 7, 2010.

== History ==
The Franciscan Sisters of the Sacred Heart came to the United States in 1876 following persecution of German Catholics during the Kulturkampf. Shortly afterward, the order moved to Joliet, Illinois, where they founded the St. Joseph Hospital. In February 1900, the rapidly growing order required a new hospital and convent to meet its needs. They purchased land in Aurora, a rapidly growing city nearby. They purchased the Coulter House on North Forth Street and used it as the first St. Charles Hospital. This became the second hospital in Aurora; the first was founded in 1886 by the Aurora City Hospital Association, who operated out of a building on Lincoln Avenue since 1888. The Franciscan order purchased the neighboring James Freeman House the next year, which then became the home of the hospital following a 1902 addition. As Aurora continued to grow, the Sisters needed to expand their space. They built a dormitory for sister in 1910 and a boiler house & laundry in 1920. The order founded a nursing school in 1922 and opened their first branch, a maternity hospital, in 1925. Recognizing the need for a large hospital building, the order began to purchase other houses on the block in the late 1920s.

The St. Charles Hospital was built for the Sisters in 1932 for $500,000. It was designed in the Art Deco style by Wybe Jelles Van der Meer, who primarily planned ecclesiastical buildings and did most of his work for the Roman Catholic Diocese of Rockford. Construction was led by contractor C. J. DeWit, whose use of local labor during the Great Depression was lauded by the Chicago Daily Tribune. The 110-bed facility replaced the original complex as an acute care facility. Rev. Edward Francis Hoban gave the opening blessing.

After years of service, the hospital became a skilled nursing facility and sanatorium as the Fox River Pavilion. Following the stabbing death of a patient, the state and federal government revoked the building's license in 2010. On June 7, 2010, the building was recognized by the National Park Service with a listing on the National Register of Historic Places.
