= West Burton Place Historic District =

- U.S. National Register of Historic Places
- U.S. Historic district
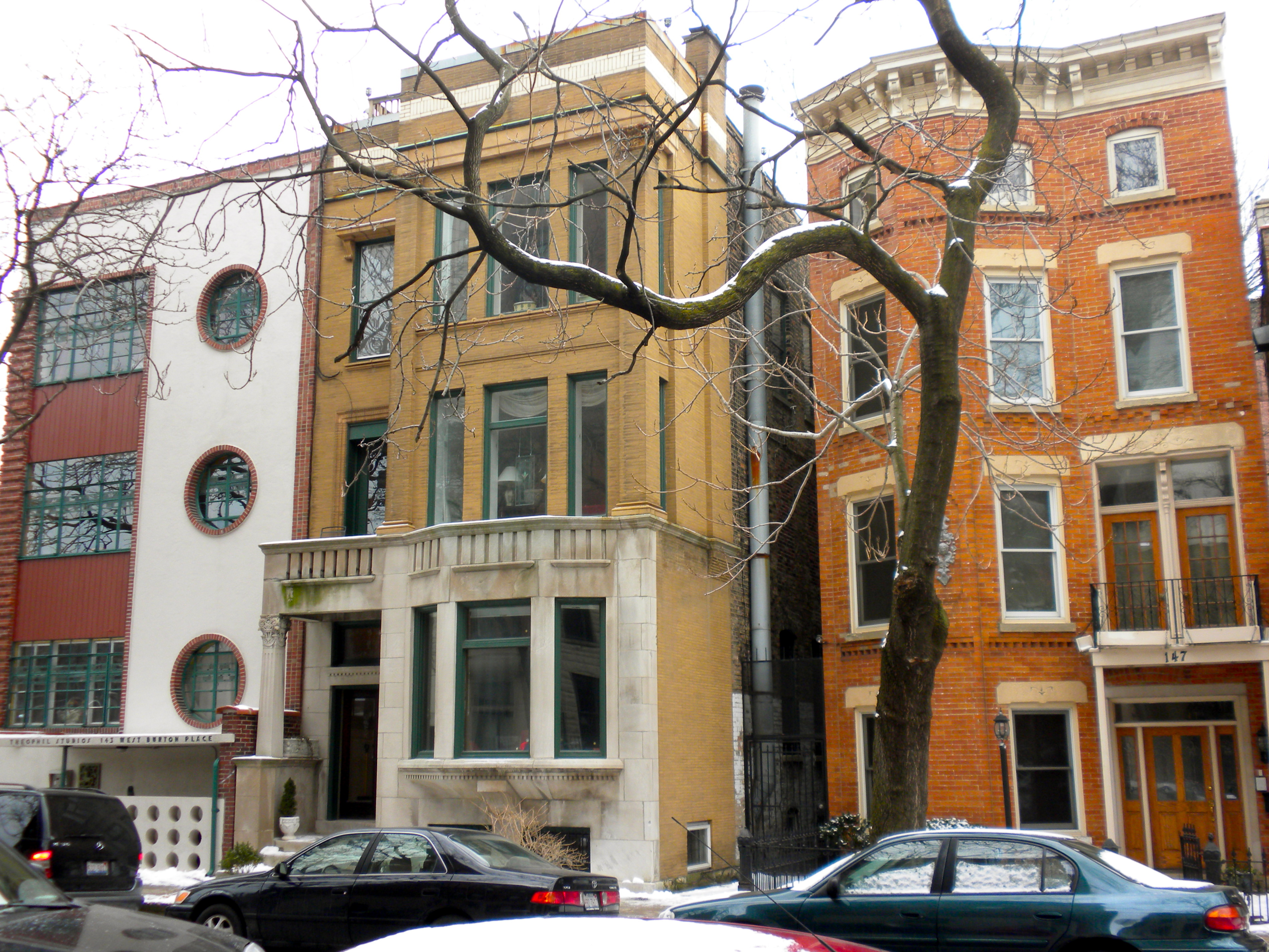

- Location within Illinois Location within the United States
- Location: 143-161 W Burton Pl, Chicago, Illinois
- Coordinates: 41°54′32″N 87°38′02″W
- Area: 3 acres (1.2 ha)
- Built: 1880
- Architect: Edgar Miller, Sol Kogen
- Architectural style: Art Moderne
- NRHP reference No.: 07001239
- Added to NRHP: December 6, 2007

The West Burton Place Historic District is a residential historic district located at 143-161 W. Burton Place in the Near North Side neighborhood of Chicago, Illinois. The district, which includes twelve main houses and five carriage houses, was developed in the late 19th century but renovated into an artists' colony in the 1920s and 1930s. Artist Edgar Miller and businessman Sol Kogen began the district's redevelopment by redesigning and opening Carl Street Studios in 1927; at the time, Burton Place was known as Carl Street. Kogen and Miller, as well as other Chicago artists, gradually converted other homes on the street into artists' studios and residences. While the homes started off as Italianate or Queen Anne structures that had become dilapidated by the 1930s, their redesigns featured then-modern styles such as Art Deco and Art Moderne; five of the street's homes retain their original designs, providing architectural contrast.

The district was added to the National Register of Historic Places on December 6, 2007. The cul-de-sac was later designated a Historic District by the City of Chicago after one of the buildings was threatened by demolition. The landmarking effort was led by author Keith Stolte, attorney and Chicago Art Deco Society Vice President Amy Keller, and Edgar Miller Legacy founder and Executive Director Zac Bleicher.
