= Reebie Storage Warehouse =

- Reebie Storage and Moving Co.
- U.S. National Register of Historic Places
- Chicago Landmark
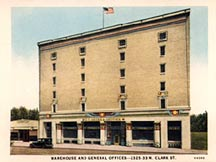
- Postcard of the Reebie Storage and Moving Co., ca. 1922
- Location: Chicago, IL
- Coordinates: 41°55′28.26″N 87°38′22.81″W
- Built: 1922; 104 years ago
- Architect: George S. Kingsley
- Architectural style: Egyptian Revival
- NRHP reference No.: 79000828

Significant dates
- Added to NRHP: March 21, 1979
- Designated CHICL: September 1, 1999

The Reebie Storage Warehouse was built for the Reebie Storage and Moving Co. in Chicago, Illinois, in 1922. Located at 2325 North Clark Street #300 in the Lincoln Park neighborhood, it is a widely recognized example of Egyptian Revival architecture. It was named to the National Register of Historic Places on March 21, 1979, and was designated a Chicago Landmark on September 1, 1999.

Architect George Kingsley (1870–1956) and sculptor Fritz Albert designed the warehouse. Albert was responsible for the exterior's terra cotta ornamentation. The moving company founders, John and William Reebie, are represented by the two statues of Ramses II that flank the main entrance. William Reebie (1859–1921) founded the company in 1880. The Reebie brothers wanted a building in a distinctive style, and John Reebie had seen another Egyptian Revival storage building in Stockton, California (designed in 1918 by Glenn Allen for the Dawson-Mayflower Moving Company). John Reebie had also visited Egypt at some time before 1921 as well.

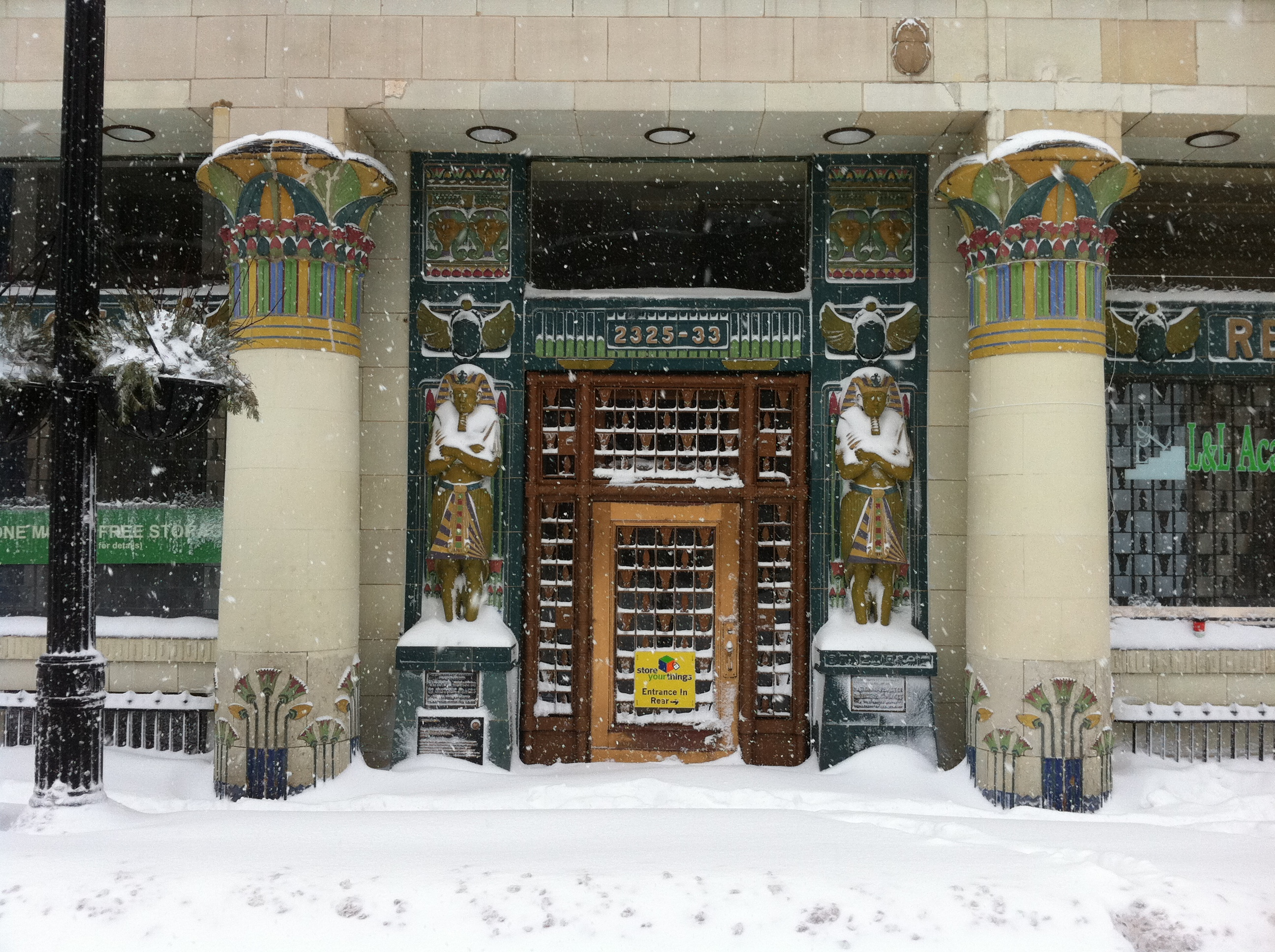
The entrance to the building during the January 31–February 2, 2011 North American winter storm

A marker on the building in 2008

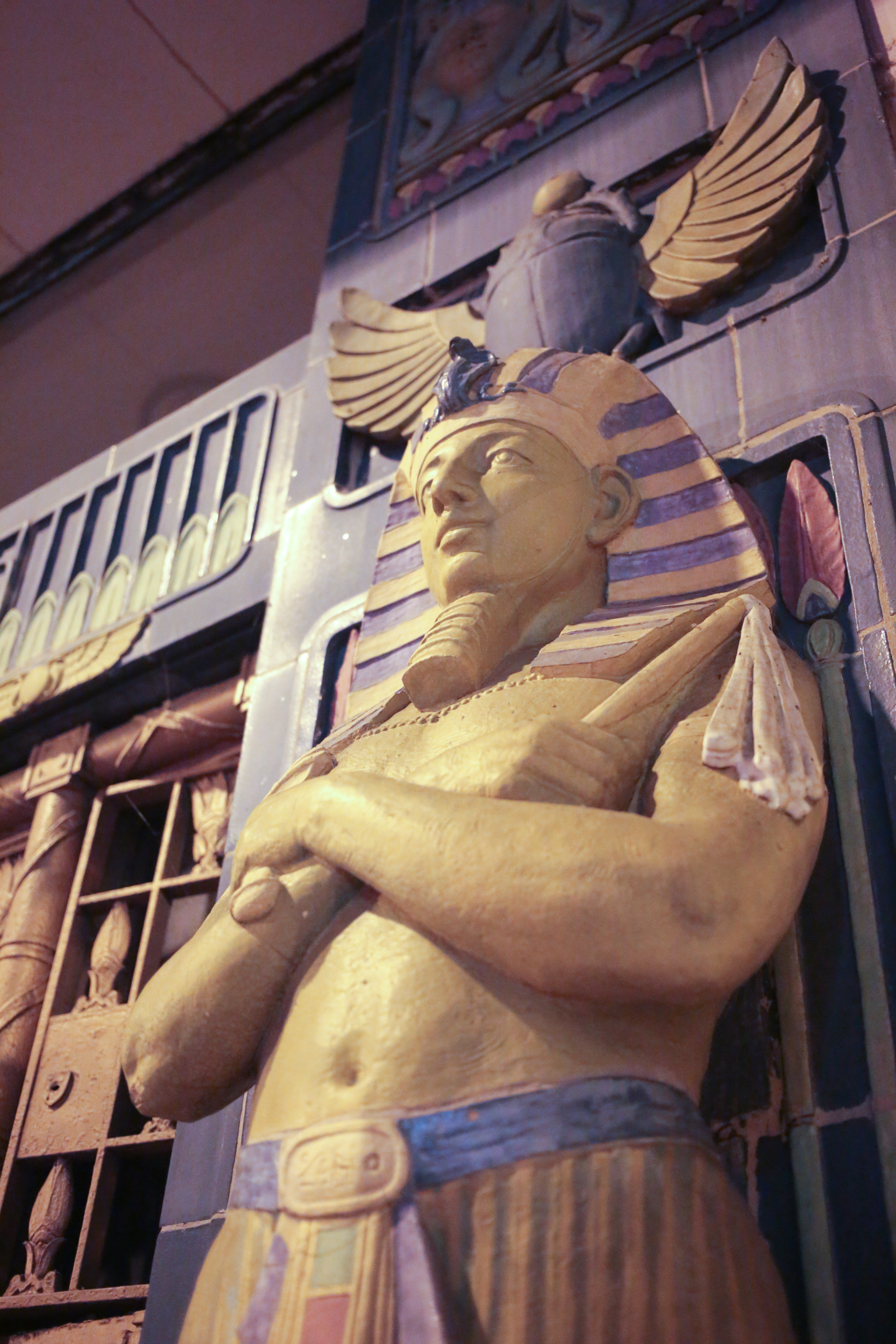
building detail, 2013

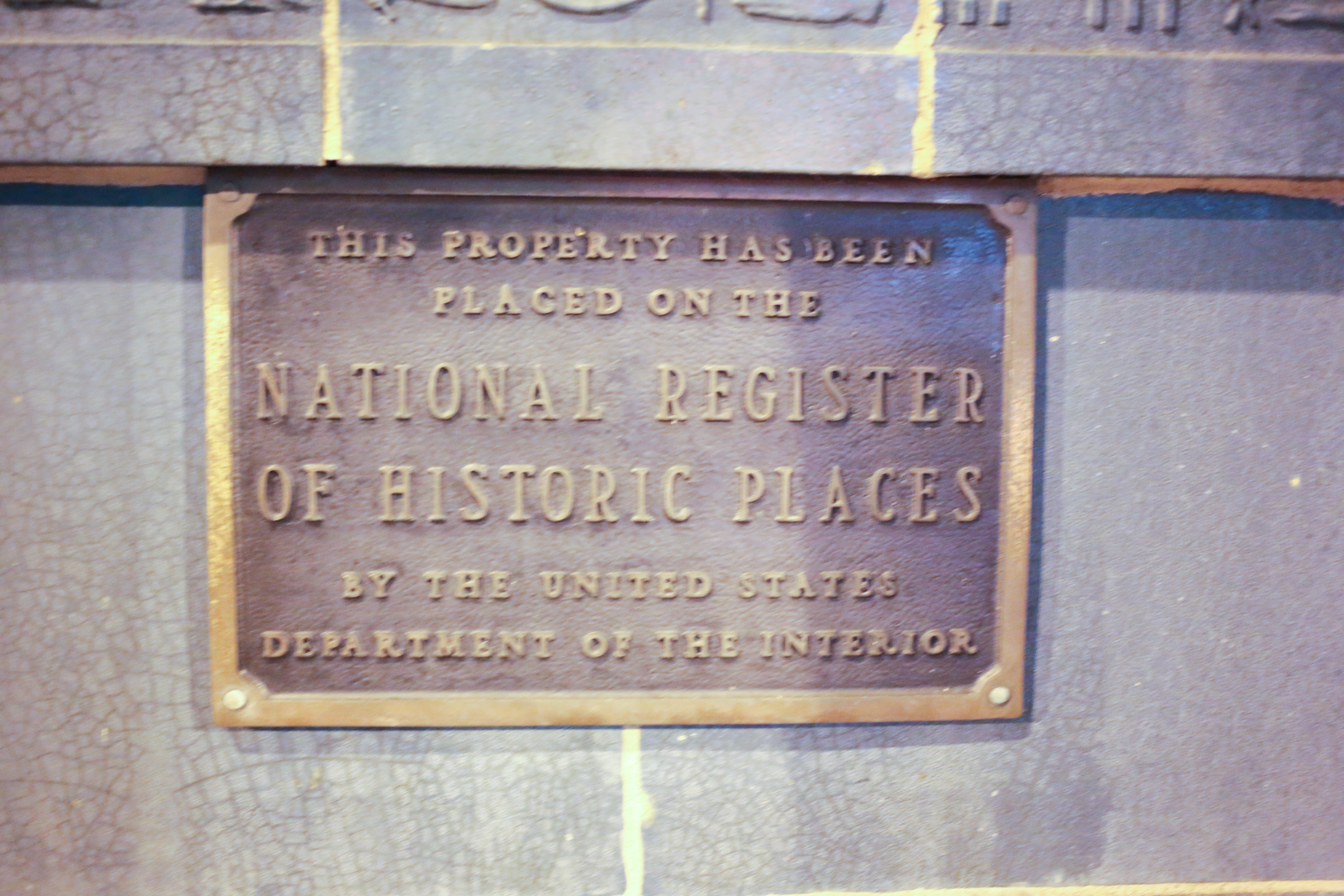
marker

== See also ==
- Chicago Landmark
- Chicago architecture
