= Chemical Reviews =

- Discipline: Chemistry
- Language: English
- Edited by: Sharon Hammes-Schiffer

Publication details
- History: 1924-present
- Publisher: American Chemical Society (United States)
- Frequency: Biweekly
- Impact factor: 64.2 (2026)

Standard abbreviations
- ISO 4: Chem. Rev.

Indexing
- CODEN: CHREAY
- ISSN: 0009-2665 (print); 1520-6890 (web)
- LCCN: 25015032
- OCLC no.: 473768321

Links
- Journal homepage; Online access; Online archive

Chemical Reviews is peer-reviewed scientific journal published twice per month by the American Chemical Society. It publishes review articles on all aspects of chemistry. It was established in 1924 by William Albert Noyes (University of Illinois). The editor-in-chief is Sharon Hammes-Schiffer.

== Abstracting and indexing ==
The journal is abstracted and indexed in Chemical Abstracts Service, CAB International, EBSCOhost, ProQuest, PubMed, Scopus, and the Science Citation Index. According to the Journal Citation Reports, the journal has a 2024 impact factor of 55.8.

== Journal ranking summary ==
Based on the latest announced rankings, Chemical Reviews is positioned among the top journals in the field of chemistry across multiple citation databases. The following table summarizes its performance across Scopus and Web of Science.

Journal ranking summary (2023)

Source	Category	Rank	Percentile	Quartile
Scopus	General Chemistry in Chemistry	1/408	99.75	Q1
IF (Web of Science)	Chemistry, Multidisciplinary	1/230	99.80	Q1
JCI (Web of Science)	Chemistry, Multidisciplinary	2/231	99.13	Q1

== See also ==
- Accounts of Chemical Research
