= National Register of Historic Places listings in Marion County, Illinois =

Location of Marion County in Illinois

This is a list of the National Register of Historic Places listings in Marion County, Illinois.

This is intended to be a complete list of the properties and districts on the National Register of Historic Places in Marion County, Illinois, United States. Latitude and longitude coordinates are provided for many National Register properties and districts; these locations may be seen together in a map.

There are 8 properties and districts listed on the National Register in the county, and one former listing.

This National Park Service list is complete through NPS recent listings posted February 13, 2026.

== Current listings ==
	Name on the Register	Image	Date listed	Location	City or town	Description
1	Charles and Naomi Bachmann House	Charles and Naomi Bachmann House	May 30, 2001 (#01000598)	401 S. Walnut St. 38°37′29″N 88°56′48″W	Salem	
2	Badollet House	Badollet House	December 6, 1990 (#90001839)	310 N. Washington St. 38°37′44″N 88°56′40″W	Salem	
3	William Jennings Bryan Boyhood Home	William Jennings Bryan Boyhood Home	February 18, 1975 (#75000668)	408 S. Broadway; 38°37′28″N 88°56′43″W	Salem	
4	Centralia Commercial Historic District	Centralia Commercial Historic District	March 7, 2012 (#12000060)	126 W. Broadway to 331 E. Broadway; 38°31′40″N 89°08′05″W	Centralia	
5	Illinois Central Railroad Water Tower and Pump House	Illinois Central Railroad Water Tower and Pump House	November 12, 1998 (#98001355)	Southwest of the junction of the I.C.& C. and E.I. Railroads; 38°45′48″N 88°51′29″W	Kinmundy	
6	Methodist Episcopal Church	Methodist Episcopal Church	August 28, 2018 (#100002823)	116 E Schwartz St. 38°37′40″N 88°56′42″W	Salem	
7	Calendar Rohrbough House	Calendar Rohrbough House	September 6, 1979 (#79000857)	3rd and Washington Sts. 38°46′17″N 88°50′42″W	Kinmundy	
8	Sentinel Building	Sentinel Building	April 15, 1978 (#78001169)	232 E. Broadway; 38°31′39″N 89°07′59″W	Centralia	

== Former listings ==
	Name on the Register	Image	Date listed	Date removed	Location	City or town	Description
1	The Centralia Elk's Lodge	The Centralia Elk's Lodge	November 7, 2011 (#08001171)	January 2, 2020	328 E. Broadway; 38°31′39″N 89°07′53″W	Centralia	

== See also ==
- List of National Historic Landmarks in Illinois
- National Register of Historic Places listings in Illinois
