= Wham (disambiguation) =

Wham! was a British pop music duo.

Wham or WHAM may also refer to:

== Places ==
- Wham, North Yorkshire, England, a hamlet in the Yorkshire Dales, United Kingdom
- Wham, Louisiana, an unincorporated community, United States

== Stations ==
- WHAM (AM) (1180 AM), a news/talk radio station in Rochester, New York
- WHAM-TV (Digital channel 9/virtual channel 13), the ABC television affiliate in Rochester, New York

== Arts and entertainment ==
- Wham! (comic), a British comic of the 1960s
- Wham!, a 2023 documentary film about the English pop duo
- "Wham!", a song by Lonnie Mack from The Wham of that Memphis Man
- WHAM (Lil Baby album), a 2025 studio album

== Other uses ==
- Wham Stadium, home ground of Accrington Stanley F.C.
- Whole Health Action Management, a peer-led intervention to facilitate self-management to reach health goals
- Winning hearts and minds
- Wisconsin H-Alpha Mapper, a telescope at the Cerro Tololo Inter-American Observatory
- Women's Health Action and Mobilization, an activist organization based in New York City
- Wham!, a UK music programme by Jack Good, started in 1960
- Whaam!, a Roy Lichtenstein painting

== People with the surname ==
- D. Wham, a member of the Thornliebank F.C. 1879–80 Scottish Cup final team
- Carol Wham, New Zealand scientist
- Dottie Wham (1925–2019), American politician
- Fred Louis Wham (1884–1967), United States federal judge
- Robert Wham (1926–2011), American lawyer and politician
- Tom Wham (American football) (1924–2006), American National Football League player
- Tom Wham (born 1944), American board game designer

== See also ==
- WAM (disambiguation)
- Wham Bar, a sugary chew bar made in the United Kingdom by Tangerine Confectionery
- Wham-O, a toy company
- WHA (AM), an American radio station.
