= Senator Wham =

Senator Wham may refer to:

- Dottie Wham (1925–2019), Colorado State Senate
- Robert Wham (1926–2011), Colorado State Senate
