= WAM =

WAM or Wam may refer to:

== Arts ==
- Weisman Art Museum, in Minneapolis
- Wichita Art Museum, in Wichita
- Women's Art Movement, a feminist art organisation in Australia
- Worcester Art Museum, in Worcester, Massachusetts

== People ==
- Arne Wam (born 1952), Norwegian journalist
- Svend Wam (1946–2017), Norwegian filmmaker
- Wam Kat (born 1956), Dutch political activist and author
- Wolfgang Amadeus Mozart (1756–1791), musician
- Wig Wam, a Norwegian glam metal band

== Technology ==
- Warren Abstract Machine, an abstract machine for the execution of Prolog
- Web access management, a form of identity management
- Web audience measurement, a tool that measures Internet usage in India
- WAM, a kind of wind wave model
- Wide area multilateration, a surveillance technology for air traffic management
- Windows Account Manager, an authentication API of Microsoft Windows

== Television ==
- Emirates News Agency, a news agency in the United Arab Emirates
- WAM!, a cable television channel for children

== Transport ==
- Walmer railway station, Dover, Kent, England (National Rail station code WAM)

== Organizations ==
- WAM Group, an Italian company

== Other uses ==
- WAM (Wide AC electric mixed), a classification of Indian locomotives
- "Wam", a 2019 song by ASAP Ferg from the EP Floor Seats
- Wam, Pakistan, a village of Ziarat District
- Weekender Records or Weekender Artist Management
- Weighted Average Mark, used for Academic grading in Australian universities
- Wet and messy fetishism
- Women, Action & the Media (WAM!), a North American non-profit focusing on gender justice and media issues

== See also ==
- Wham (disambiguation)
