= Non-denominational Christianity =

Churches and Christians that are not aligned to a particular Christian denomination

Non-denominational Christianity (or nondenominational Christianity) is a concept originating in the United States within Evangelicalism, whereby churches, and individual Christians, would distance themselves from the confessionalism or creedalism of other Christian communities by not formally aligning with a specific Christian denomination.

In North America, non-denominational Christianity arose in the 19th century through the Stone-Campbell Restoration Movement, with followers organizing themselves simply as "Christians" and "Disciples of Christ". (Note: The modern streams of the Stone-Campbell Movement share similar names but different relations to non-denominational Christianity. During the 19th century, congregations would typically be named "Disciples of Christ", "Christian Church", and/or "Church of Christ". Over the course of the early to mid 20th century, the Movement split into three streams and the terms previously used interchangeably became solidified with particular streams. The Churches of Christ, which were recognized as separate in 1906, and the Christian churches and churches of Christ, which separated as early as 1926 and as late as 1968, both still identify as non-denominational. The Christian Church (Disciples of Christ), which is the only stream to use the "Disciples" name, gradually organized as a denomination over the same time period and stopped identifying as non-denominational.) The non-denominational movement saw expansion during the 20th century Jesus movement era, which popularized contemporary Christian music and Christian media within global pop culture. As of 2020, non-denominational Christianity was the largest Protestant movement overall in the United States, with Baptists second.

Many non-denominational churches adhere to congregationalist polity, while others are governed by elders. Some non-denominational churches are independent, while others cooperate in loose associations such as the Churches of Christ; in other cases, non-denominational churches are founded by individual pastors such as Calvary Chapel Association established by Chuck Smith. Some non-denominational churches have grown quite recently within networks like Acts 29. Certain non-denominational churches are associated with various movements in Christendom, such as evangelicalism or Charismatic Christianity.

There are also non-denominational Christians and churches in other parts of the world including Asia. In Singapore and Malaysia, these churches are also more numerous, since the 1990s.

== History ==
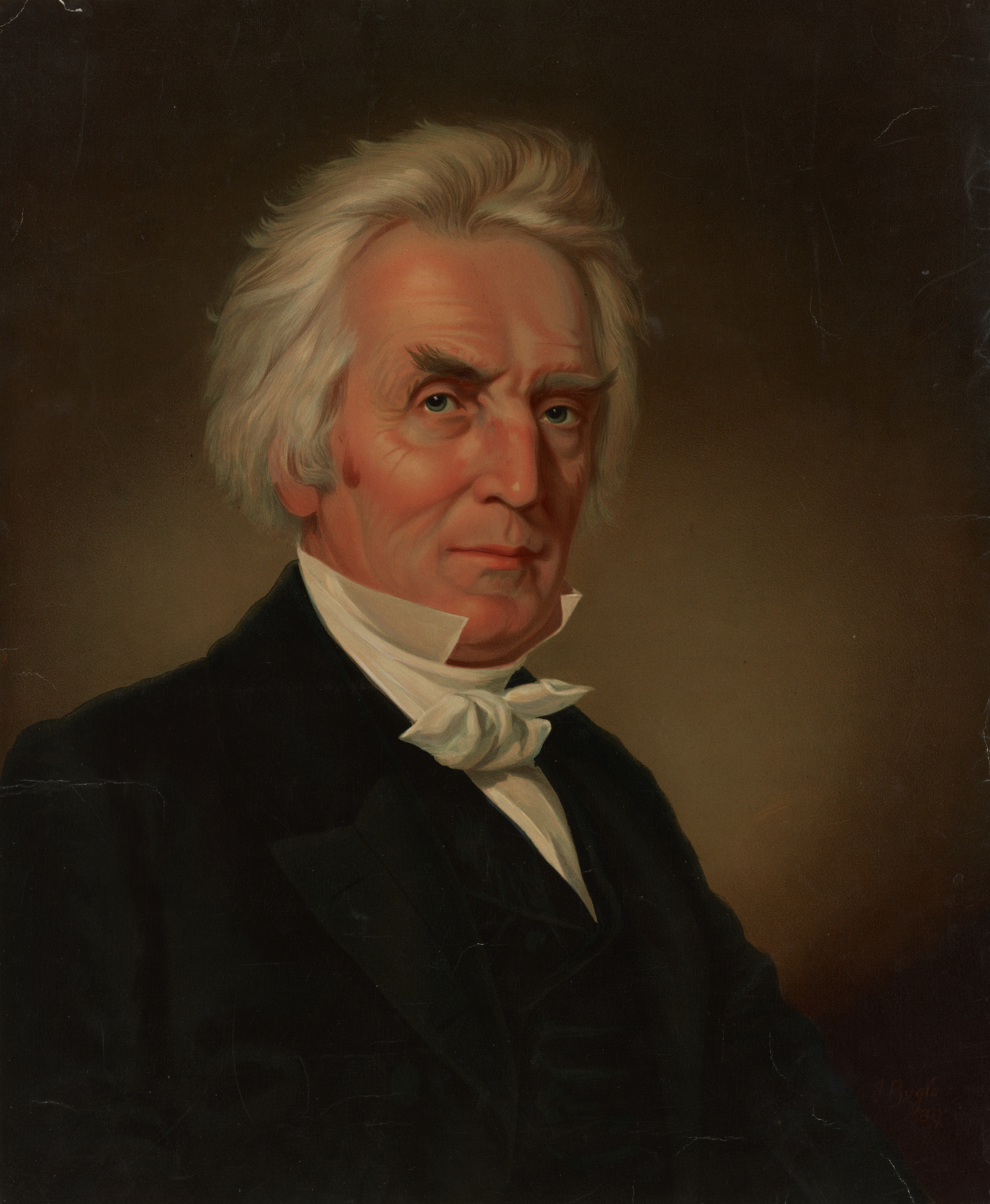
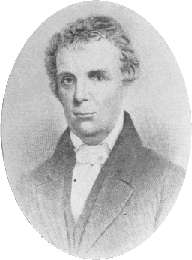
Alexander Campbell and Barton Stone believed in a non-denominational Christianity, which they spread in what is known as the Restoration Movement.

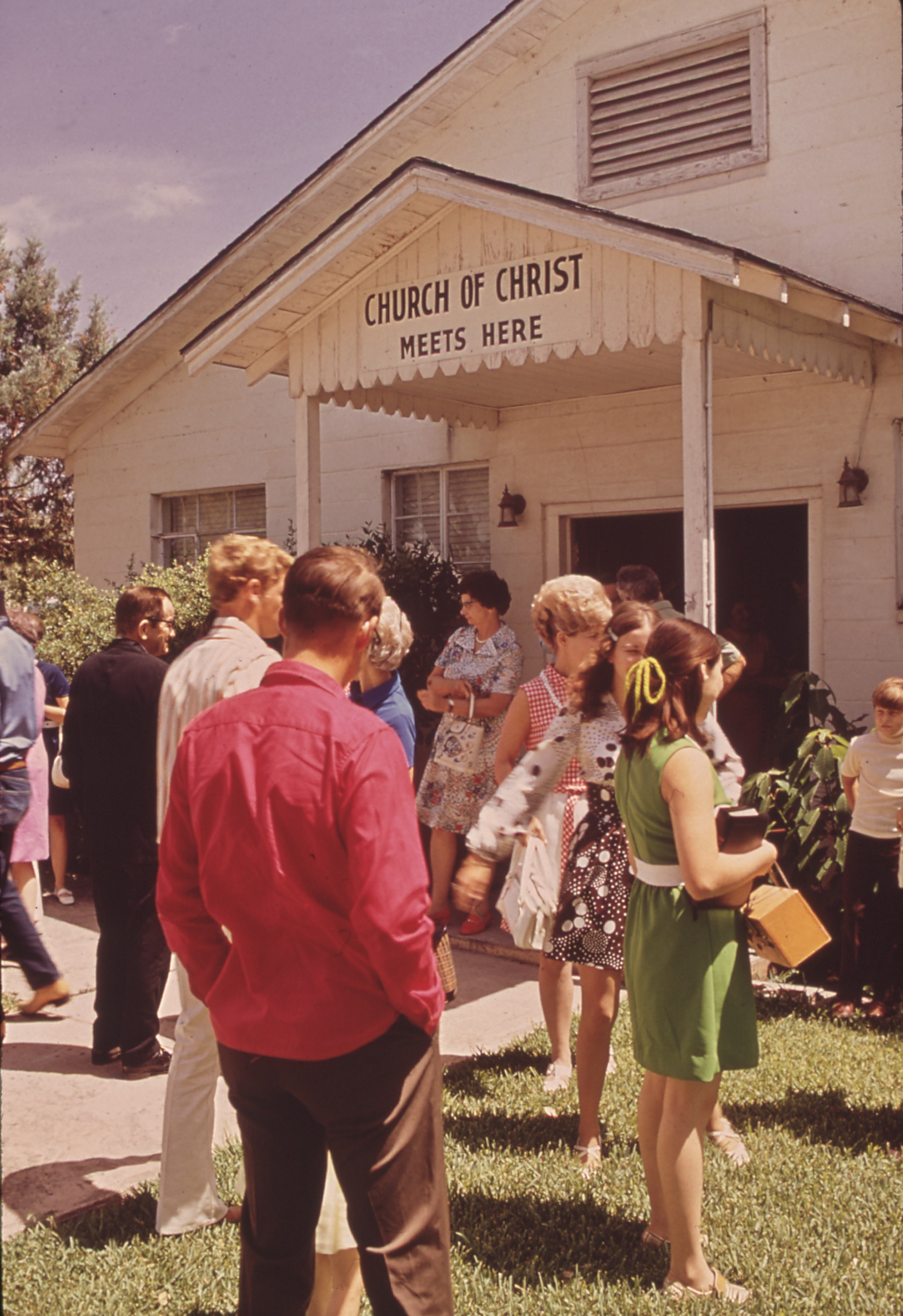
Congregants outside a Church of Christ in Texas, 1972

Non-denominational Christianity first arose in the 18th century through the Stone–Campbell Restoration Movement, with followers organizing themselves simply as "Christians" and "Disciples of Christ". Congregations in this tradition of non-denominational Christianity often refer to themselves as Churches of Christ or Christian churches. Sometimes the name "Independent Christian Church" is used to differentiate the congregation from the Christian Church (Disciples of Christ), the group of Stone–Campbell churches which formed a denomination over the course of the early and mid 20th century.

Independent non-denominational churches continued to appear in the United States in the course of the 20th century.

Non-denominational congregations experienced significant and continuous growth in the 21st century, particularly in the United States. In 2010, there were 35,496 non-denominational churches in the US with over 12 million congregants.

If combined into a single group, non-denominational churches collectively represented the third-largest Christian grouping in the United States in 2010, after the Roman Catholic Church and Southern Baptist Convention. As of 2020, non-denominational churches collectively represented the second-largest group, with Baptists third.

== Characteristics ==
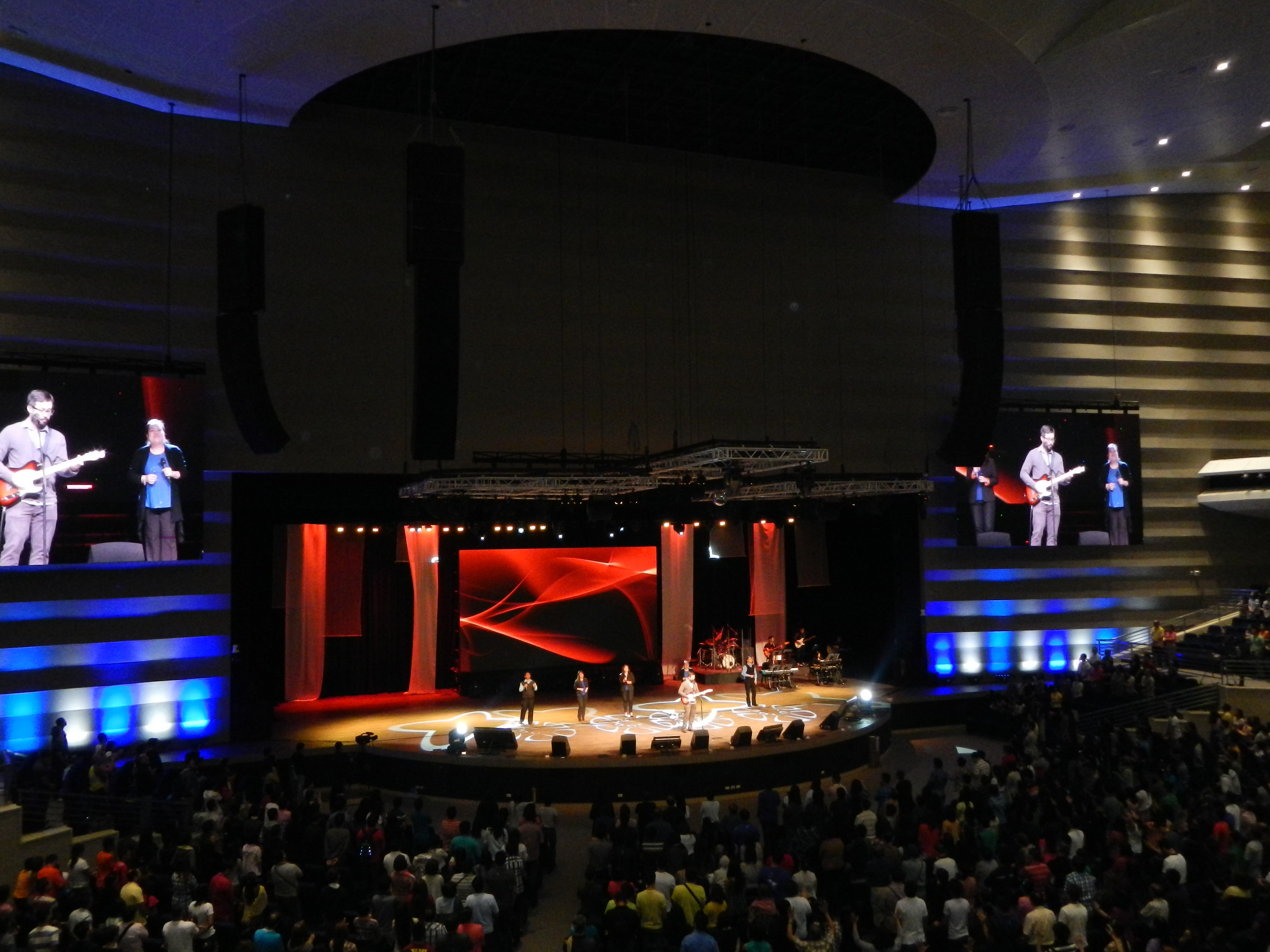
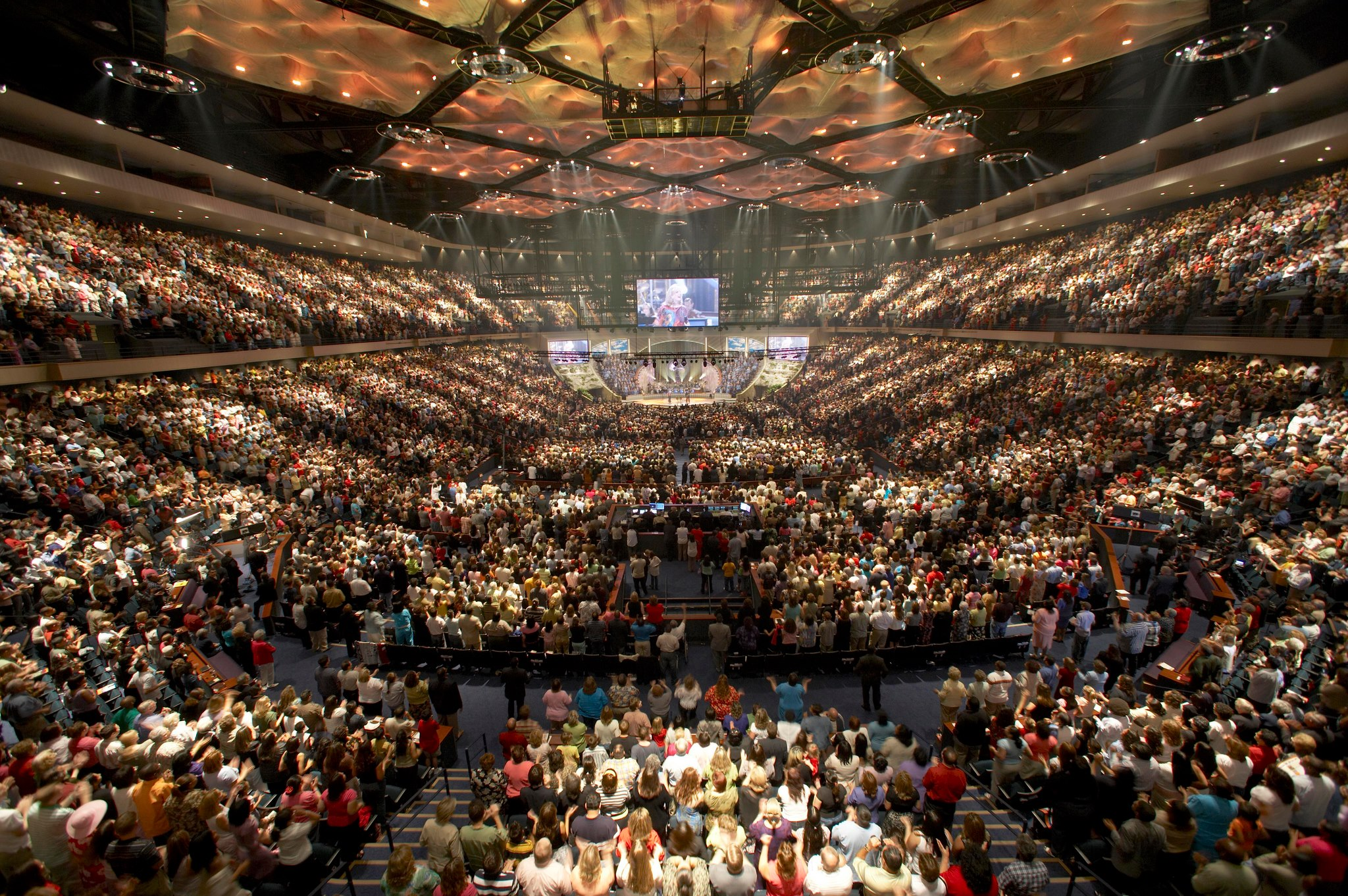
Worship services at Christ's Commission Fellowship in the Philippines (top) and Lakewood Church in the U.S. (bottom)

Non-denominational churches are by definition not affiliated with any specific denominational stream of Christianity, whether by choice from their foundation or because they separated from their denomination of origin at some point in their history. Like denominational congregations, non-denominational congregations vary in size, worship, and other characteristics. Although independent, many non-denominational congregations choose to affiliate with a broader network of congregations.

Many non-denominational churches can nevertheless be positioned in existing movements, such as Evangelicalism and Pentecostalism, even though they are autonomous and have no formal labels.

Non-denominational churches may include certain megachurches, while other megachurches are affiliated with large denominations, such as Frazer Free Methodist Church.

Certain neo-charismatic churches often use the term non-denominational to define themselves.

Many non-denominational churches identify solely with Christianity, rather than a specific branch of it (Catholicism, Protestantism, Orthodoxy, and Restorationism). Most "other Christians" in America belong to non-denominational churches.

Citing data from the Cooperative Congressional Election Study and General Social Survey, political scientist and statistician Ryan Burge noted that non-denominational Christians are very similar to Southern Baptists, but with some caveats. Burge writes, "Nondenominational churches are typically younger and more racially diverse than Southern Baptist churches. On religious matters, both groups attend church at the same rate, yet nondenominationals are more likely to hold a moderate theological position on the Bible than SBC churchgoers. Finally, when it comes to politics it seems that Southern Baptists and nondenominational Christians are very similar. Nondenominational parishioners are slightly more supportive of same-sex marriage and slightly less supportive of abortion rights, but these differences are small."

== Criticism ==
Boston University religion scholar Stephen Prothero argues that non-denominationalism hides the fundamental theological and spiritual issues that initially drove the division of Christianity into denominations behind a veneer of "Christian unity". He argues that non-denominationalism encourages a descent of Christianity—and indeed, all religions—into comfortable "general moralism" rather than being a focus for facing the complexities of churchgoers' culture and spirituality. Prothero further argues that it also encourages ignorance of the Scriptures, lowering the overall religious literacy while increasing the potential for inter-religious misunderstandings and conflict.

Steven R. Harmon, a Baptist theologian who supports ecumenism, argues that "there's really no such thing" as a non-denominational church, because "as soon as a supposedly non-denominational church has made decisions about what happens in worship, whom and how they will baptize, how and with what understanding they will celebrate holy communion, what they will teach, who their ministers will be and how they will be ordered, or how they relate to those churches, these decisions have placed the church within the stream of a specific type of denominational tradition". Harmon argues that the cause of Christian unity is best served through denominational traditions, since each "has historical connections to the church's catholicity ... and we make progress toward unity when the denominations share their distinctive patterns of catholicity with one another".

Presbyterian dogmatic theologian Amy Plantinga Pauw writes that Protestant non-denominational congregations "often seem to lack any acknowledgement of their debts and ties to larger church traditions" and argues that "for now, these non-denominational churches are living off the theological capital of more established Christian communities, including those of denominational Protestantism". Pauw considers denominationalism to be a "unifying and conserving force in Christianity, nurturing and carrying forward distinctive theological traditions" (such as Wesleyanism being supported by Methodist denominations).

In 2011, American evangelical professor Ed Stetzer attributed to individualism the reason for the increase in the number of evangelical churches claiming to be non-denominational Christianity.

Ryan Burge argues that non-denominational churches are less equipped to monitor or report sexual abuse cases because they lack national organizations to do so. Because of their lack of an organizational structure, accountability is minimal.

In an article on evangelical clergy sex abuse in The New Republic by Elle Hardy, religious studies scholar Matthew D. Taylor argues that the relative lack of accountability in non-denominational churches attract pastors "who are more megalomaniacal and authoritarian in their personality". Since non-denominational churches lack a hierarchy to answer to, pastors with authoritarian personalities are given more opportunities to exert power and control over their congregants. Non-denominational preachers claim to have oversight from their boards and mentorship from "spiritual parents", but these are usually people they know. Taylor argues, "They're incentivized to protect their friends and protect the oligarchy. They all have a stake in it, and none of them have personal incentives other than principled theological convictions to actually hold their friends accountable, so that the incentives all push in the direction of abuse and cover-up rather than in the direction of accountability and exposure."

== See also ==
- Evangelicalism
- Protestantism in the United States
- History of Protestantism in the United States
- Community Church movement
- Jesuism
- Local churches
- Non-church movement
- Non-denominational Muslim
- Non-denominational Judaism
- Postdenominationalism
- Sunday Christian
- Southern Baptist Convention
- Mere Christianity
