= Charles and Naomi Bachmann House =

Historic house in Illinois, United States

- U.S. National Register of Historic Places
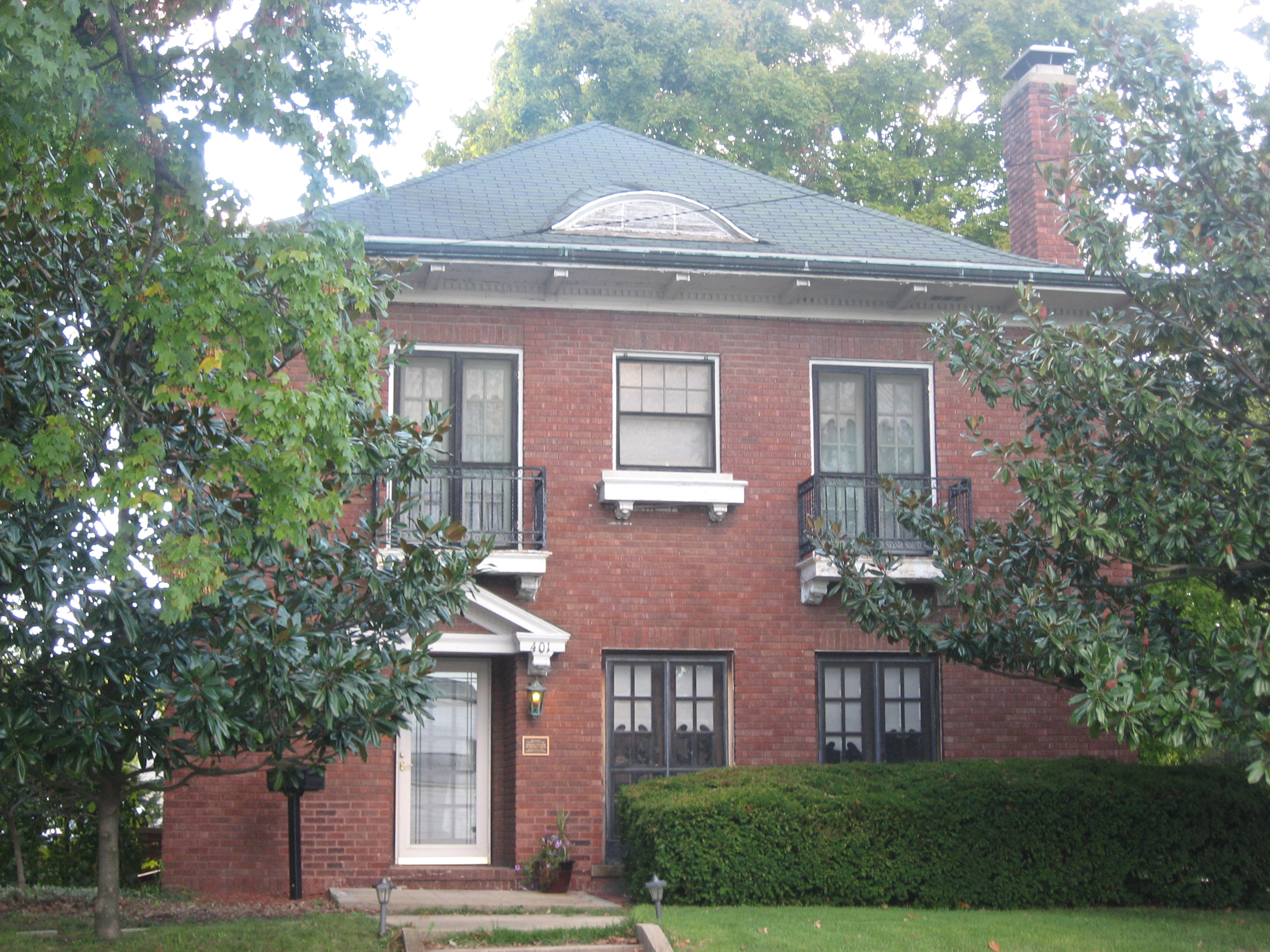
- Front of the house

- Location within Illinois Location within the United States
- Location: 401 S. Walnut St., Salem, Illinois
- Coordinates: 38°37′42″N 88°56′53″W
- Area: less than one acre
- Architect: Morrow, William; The Architects' Small House Service
- Architectural style: Classical Revival, Mediterranean
- NRHP reference No.: 01000598
- Added to NRHP: May 30, 2001

The Charles and Naomi Bachmann House is a historic house located at 401 S. Walnut St. in Salem, Illinois. The house was built in 1929 for Charles Bachmann, a local furniture salesman, and his wife Naomi. Architect William Morrow designed the house using a plan from a book published by the Architects' Small House Service Bureau. The Architects' Small House Service Bureau, which was endorsed by the American Institute of Architects, was organized to provide plans for builders of small houses, most of whom could not afford professional architects. The Bachmann House's plan incorporated elements of the Classical Revival and Mediterranean Revival styles. The house's design features two second-floor iron balconies with decorative acanthus brackets, a pediment above the front door, and a tile roof.

The house was listed on the National Register of Historic Places in 2001. It is one of three properties in Salem listed on the Register. The other two properties, also houses, are the William Jennings Bryan Boyhood Home and the Badollet House.
