= Ryan Burge =

Ryan Burge may refer to:

- Ryan Burge (footballer) (born 1988), English footballer
- Ryan Burge (political scientist), American political scientist
