= Illinois Central Railroad Water Tower and Pump House =

- U.S. National Register of Historic Places
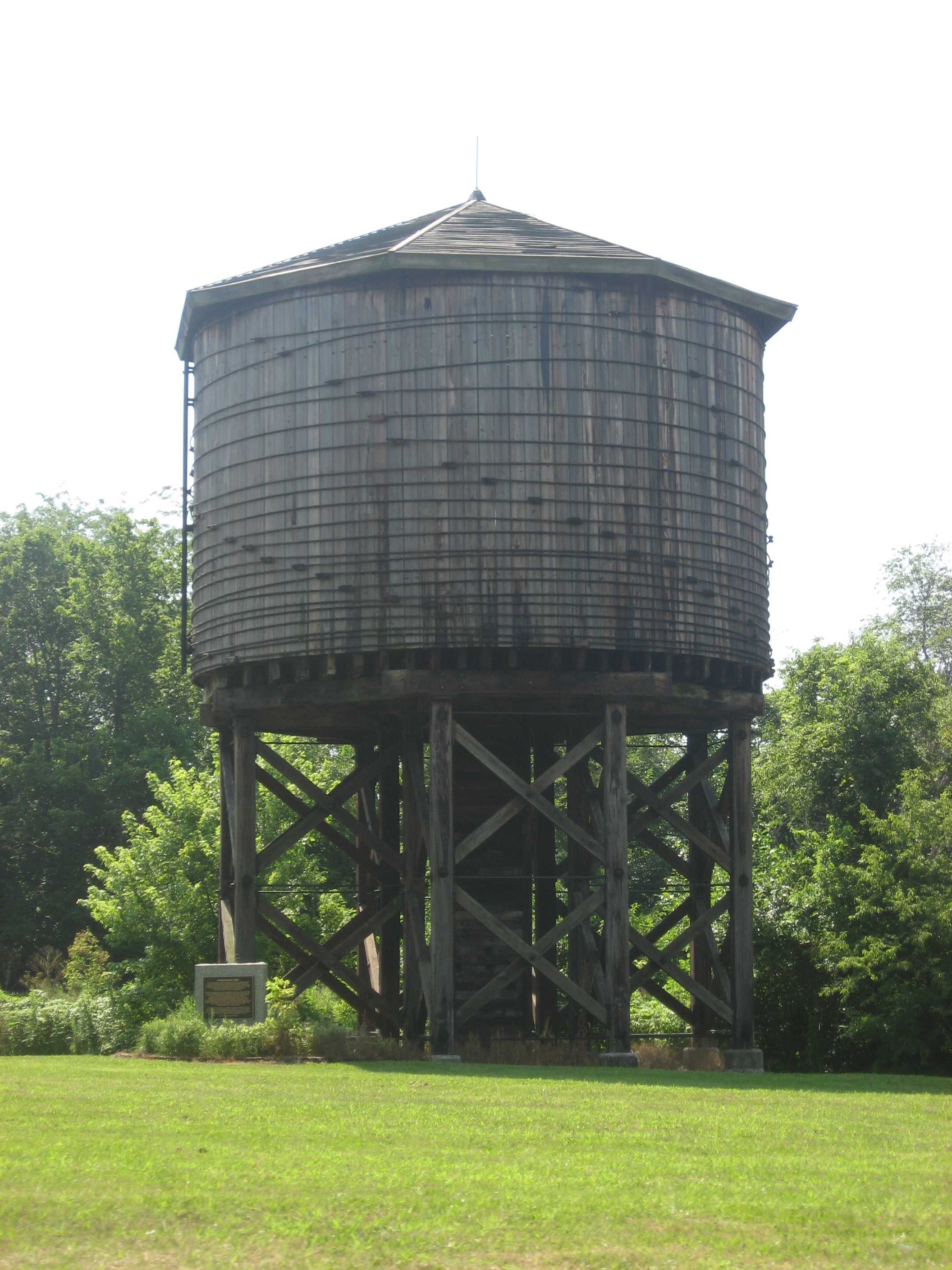
- Roadside view of the water tower

- Location within Illinois Location within the United States
- Location: SW of jct. of I.C.& C. and E.I. R.Rs., Kinmundy, Illinois
- Coordinates: 38°46′23″N 88°50′58″W
- Area: 2 acres (0.81 ha)
- Built: 1885
- NRHP reference No.: 98001355
- Added to NRHP: November 12, 1998

The Illinois Central Railroad Water Tower and Pump House are a water tower and pump house in Kinmundy, Illinois, which served the Illinois Central Railroad.

== History ==
The Illinois Central first built a line through Kinmundy in 1856. As steam engines could only carry a limited water supply at the time, the railroad was dependent on local sources of water near the towns it stopped at. Since these sources were often unreliable, the railroad created its own water supply in several locations. Kinmundy, where the railroad created a 28 acres (11 ha) reservoir, was one such town. The water tower and pump house stored water from the lake and transported it to steam trains.

Similar towers were located every 15 to 20 miles (24 to 32 km) along the line; the towers were used until the Illinois Central ceased to use steam locomotives in the 1950s. In 1951, the city of Kinmundy purchased the water tower and pump house for municipal use.

== Conservation ==
The tower is one of two remaining wooden water towers along Illinois Central lines in Illinois, and as the town's depots have been demolished, the two buildings are the only extant structures representing Illinois Central service to Kinmundy.

The structures were added to the National Register of Historic Places in 1998. They comprise one of Kinmundy's two National Register listings, along with the Calendar Rohrbough House.
