= Erastus D. Telford =

American politician and lawyer

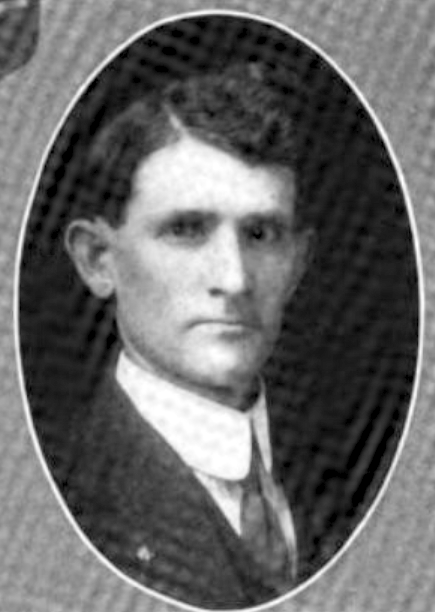

Member of the Illinois Senate
- In office 1910–1912
- In office 1920–1928

Personal details
- Born: Erastus Dalson Telford; April 23, 1874 Salem, Illinois
- Died: December 4, 1936 (aged 62) DeKalb, Illinois
- Party: Republican
- Education: McKendree University; Georgetown University Law Center
- Occupation: Lawyer, politician

Erastus Dalson Telford (April 23, 1874 – December 4, 1936) was an American politician and lawyer.

== Biography ==
Telford was born near Salem, Illinois and graduated from Salem High School. He graduated from McKendree University and Georgetown University Law Center. He was admitted to the Illinois bar and practiced law in Salem. Teford served as the Salem city attorney. Telford served in the United States Army during World War I and was commissioned a major. Telford served in the Illinois Senate in 1911 and 1912 and from 1921 to 1929. He was a Republican. Teford died at Gliden Memorial Hospital in DeKalb, Illinois from an infection he suffered after fracturing his leg in an automobile accident near Vandalia, Illinois on October 25, 1936.
