= Centralia, Illinois =

City in the United States

- City
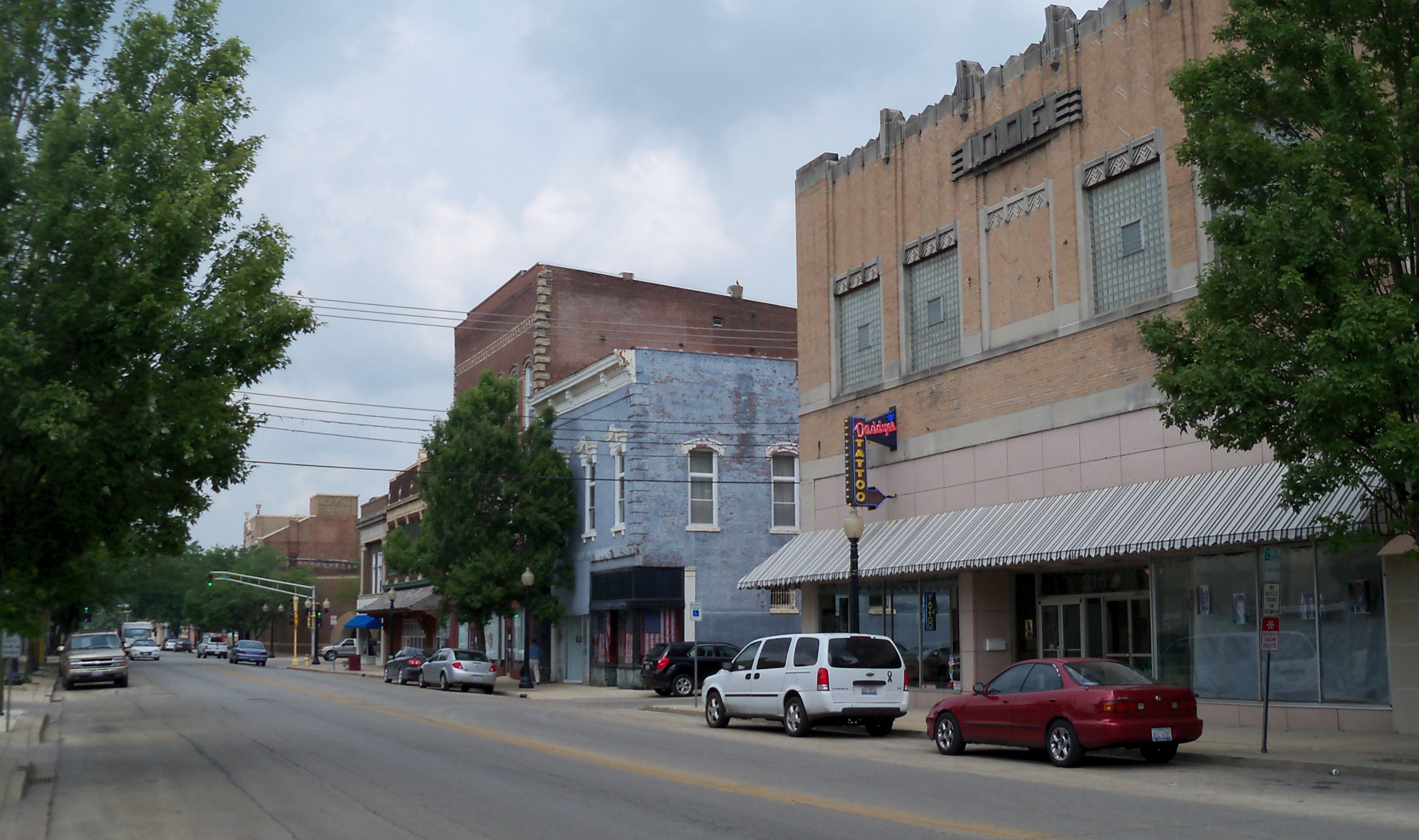
- Buildings in downtown Centralia, Illinois, USA.

- Flag

- Location of Centralia in (clockwise from upper left) Clinton, Marion, Jefferson, and Washington Counties, Illinois.
- Coordinates: 38°31′20″N 89°07′58″W
- Country: United States
- State: Illinois
- Counties: Clinton, Jefferson, Marion, Washington
- Townships: Centralia, Brookside, Grand Prairie, Irvington
- Founded: 1853
- Named for: Illinois Central Railroad

Government
  - Type: Manager-Council
  - Body: City Council

Area
  - Total: 9.23 sq mi (23.91 km^{2})
  - Land: 8.20 sq mi (21.24 km^{2})
  - Water: 1.03 sq mi (2.67 km^{2})
- Elevation: 502 ft (153 m)

Population (2020)
  - Total: 12,182
  - Density: 1,485.6/sq mi (573.61/km^{2})
- Time zone: UTC−6 (CST)
  - Summer (DST): UTC−5 (CDT)
- ZIP code: 62801
- Area codes: 618,730
- FIPS code: 17-12164
- GNIS ID: 2393787
- Website: www.cityofcentralia.org

Centralia is a city in Clinton, Jefferson, Marion, and Washington counties in the U.S. state of Illinois with the largest portion in Marion County. The city is the largest in three counties, Clinton, Marion, and Washington, but it is not a county seat for any of them. The population was 12,182 as of the 2020 census, down from 13,032 in 2010.

== History ==
Centralia is named for the Illinois Central Railroad, built in 1853. The city was founded where the two original branches of the railroad converged. Centralia was first chartered as a city in 1859. Canadian National currently owns the line.

The intersection of the Third Principal Meridian and its baseline is in the southern city limits. This initial point was established in 1815, and it governs land surveys for about 60% of the state of Illinois, including Chicago. The original monument is at the junction of Highway 51 and the Marion-Jefferson County Line Road; today there is a small easement situated in the northeast corner of this intersection, which contains a monument and historical marker. Many Germans settled on the north side of town and Italians on the south side of town.

Production of the PayDay candy bar began here in 1938. Michael Moore's documentary, The Big One (1998), opens with the closing of this candy bar plant in the late 20th century. It addresses similar economic woes in other cities.

The town of Centerville, Washington, was renamed Centralia, Washington to avoid being confused with another Centerville in that state. A former resident of the Illinois town suggested the change.

Centralia's city flag was designed in 1924 by Wendell Bauer, whose design was awarded first prize in a community-wide design competition. A broad red stripe through the center of the flag represents the railroads to which the city owes its existence. A gold star above and below the stripe signifies the area's mining and agricultural industries. Lastly, a triangle pyramid with a sphinx head design is symbolic of Egypt, a tribute to Southern Illinois’ nickname, “Little Egypt”.

The Centralia mine disaster occurred in 1947 when the nearby Centralia No. 5 coal mine exploded, killing 111 people. The disaster was memorialized in folk singer Woody Guthrie's song "The Dying Miner".

== Geography ==
Centralia is located approximately 60 miles (97 km) east of St. Louis, Missouri. Most of the city, including its downtown, is in southwestern Marion County; however, the city extends west into Clinton County and south 5 miles (8 km) into Washington and Jefferson counties. The city is 10 miles (16 km) north of exit 61 of Interstate 64 and 9 miles (14 km) west of exit 109 of Interstate 57. Centralia is one of three Illinois cities with portions in four counties, the others being Barrington Hills and Aurora. Because of its unique location within multiple counties, portions of Centralia are associated with different Core Based Statistical Areas (CBSAs). The Centralia Micropolitan Statistical Area includes all of Marion County. The Clinton County portion of the city is considered part of the St. Louis, MO–IL Metropolitan Statistical Area, while the Jefferson County portion lies within the Mt. Vernon Micropolitan Statistical Area. The portion of Centralia in Washington County is not considered part of any metropolitan or micropolitan area.

According to the 2021 census gazetteer files, Centralia has a total area of 9.23 square miles (23.91 km^{2}), of which 8.20 square miles (21.24 km^{2}) (or 88.81%) is land and 1.03 square miles (2.67 km^{2}) (or 11.19%) is water.

== Demographics ==
Historical population
| Census | Pop. | Note | %± |
|---|---|---|---|
| 1870 | 3,190 | | — |
| 1880 | 3,621 | | 13.5% |
| 1890 | 4,763 | | 31.5% |
| 1900 | 6,721 | | 41.1% |
| 1910 | 9,680 | | 44.0% |
| 1920 | 12,491 | | 29.0% |
| 1930 | 12,583 | | 0.7% |
| 1940 | 16,343 | | 29.9% |
| 1950 | 13,863 | | −15.2% |
| 1960 | 13,904 | | 0.3% |
| 1970 | 15,966 | | 14.8% |
| 1980 | 15,126 | | −5.3% |
| 1990 | 14,274 | | −5.6% |
| 2000 | 14,136 | | −1.0% |
| 2010 | 13,032 | | −7.8% |
| 2020 | 12,182 | | −6.5% |
U.S. Decennial Census

=== Racial and ethnic composition ===
Centralia city, Illinois – Racial and ethnic composition Note: the US Census treats Hispanic/Latino as an ethnic category. This table excludes Latinos from the racial categories and assigns them to a separate category. Hispanics/Latinos may be of any race.
| Race / Ethnicity (NH = Non-Hispanic) | Pop 2000 | Pop 2010 | Pop 2020 | % 2000 | % 2010 | % 2020 |
|---|---|---|---|---|---|---|
| White alone (NH) | 12,128 | 10,999 | 9,356 | 85.80% | 84.40% | 76.80% |
| Black or African American alone (NH) | 1,456 | 1,317 | 1,333 | 10.30% | 10.11% | 10.94% |
| Native American or Alaska Native alone (NH) | 33 | 42 | 22 | 0.23% | 0.32% | 0.18% |
| Asian alone (NH) | 103 | 93 | 254 | 0.73% | 0.71% | 2.09% |
| Pacific Islander alone (NH) | 8 | 1 | 0 | 0.06% | 0.01% | 0.00% |
| Other race alone (NH) | 20 | 6 | 49 | 0.14% | 0.05% | 0.40% |
| Mixed race or Multiracial (NH) | 218 | 293 | 767 | 1.54% | 2.25% | 6.30% |
| Hispanic or Latino (any race) | 170 | 281 | 401 | 1.20% | 2.16% | 3.29% |
| Total | 14,136 | 13,032 | 12,182 | 100.00% | 100.00% | 100.00% |

=== 2020 census ===
As of the 2020 census, Centralia had a population of 12,182. The median age was 41.1 years. 23.2% of residents were under the age of 18 and 21.9% of residents were 65 years of age or older. For every 100 females there were 90.9 males, and for every 100 females age 18 and over there were 87.8 males age 18 and over.

98.3% of residents lived in urban areas, while 1.7% lived in rural areas.

There were 5,280 households and 2,776 families in Centralia, of which 26.3% had children under the age of 18 living in them. Of all households, 33.0% were married-couple households, 21.2% were households with a male householder and no spouse or partner present, and 37.0% were households with a female householder and no spouse or partner present. About 37.7% of all households were made up of individuals and 19.0% had someone living alone who was 65 years of age or older.

There were 5,900 housing units, of which 10.5% were vacant. The homeowner vacancy rate was 2.4% and the rental vacancy rate was 8.2%.

== Arts and culture ==
=== Centralia Cultural Society ===
The Centralia Cultural Society is a community arts center. The center hosts the Centralia Philharmonic Orchestra (an amateur orchestra), the Little Theatre Players, the Choral Society, Bronze Expressions Handbell Ensemble; and periodically hosts galleries by the Light and Lens photography club, and Palette and Brush club, and student art shows. The Little Theatre Players was established in 1961, and performs plays and musicals.

=== Local features ===
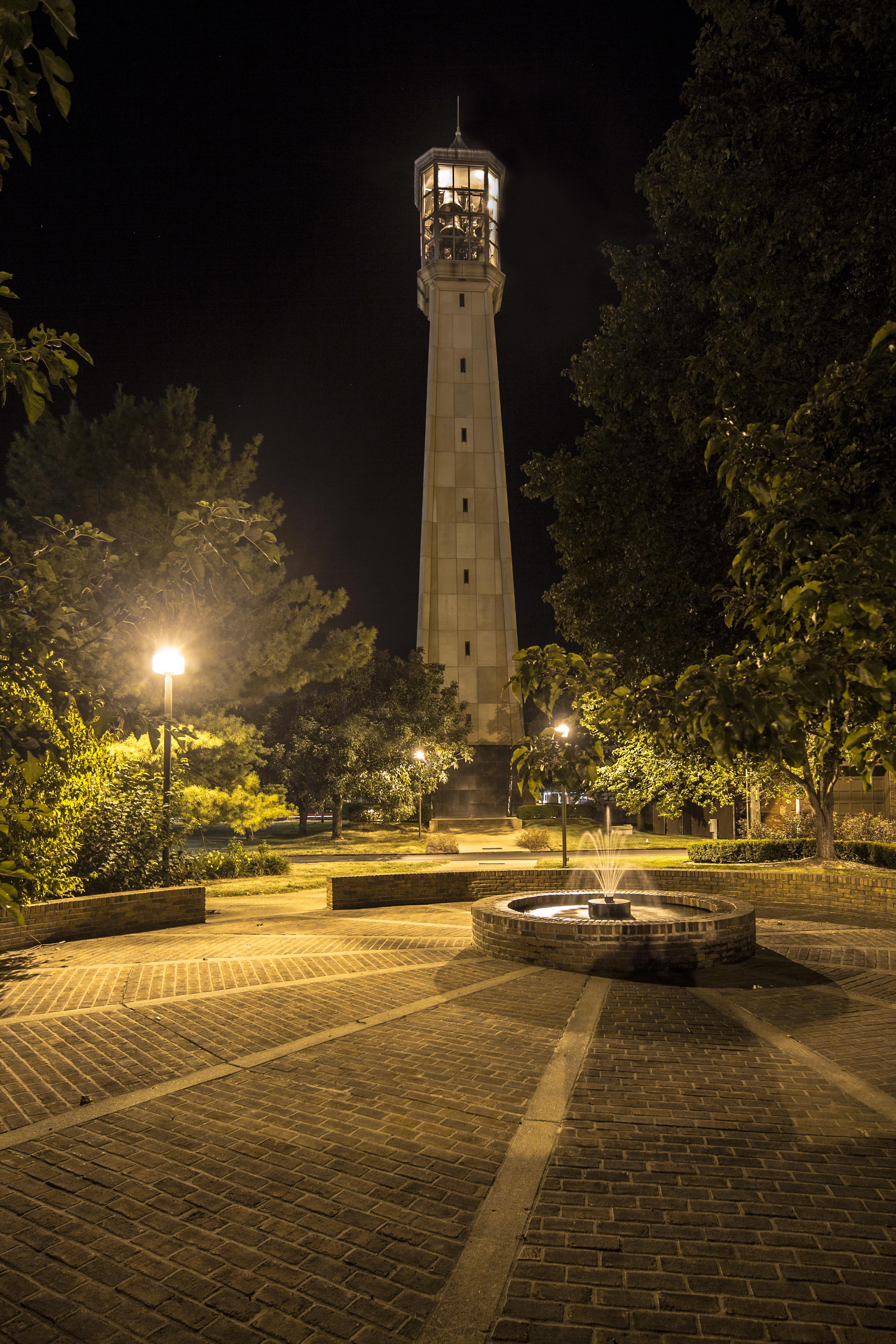
Centralia Bell Tower

Foundation Park is the site of the annual Balloon Fest. Recent events have had about forty balloons and drew 40,000 visitors. The Annual Centralia Balloon Festival was the event in which the second "Space Shuttle" hot air balloon crashed and burned due to a fuel line defect.

Foundation Park also hosts the Fantasy of Lights drive-through holiday light display during November and December.

In addition to Foundation Park, the Centralia Foundation supports the Centralia Carillon. Completed in 1983, with 65 bells, the carillon is ranked as the eighth-largest in the world. The largest bell, Great Tom, weighs 5 1/2 tons. Currently, the tower is under renovation and looking for a carillonneur.

One of only two remaining 2500-class steam locomotives from the Illinois Central Railroad is preserved on static display at Centralia's Fairview Park. The Age of Steam Memorial non-profit organization maintains the locomotive. A 9415 caboose and a rare Republic F-105 Thunderchief aircraft are also on display in the park.

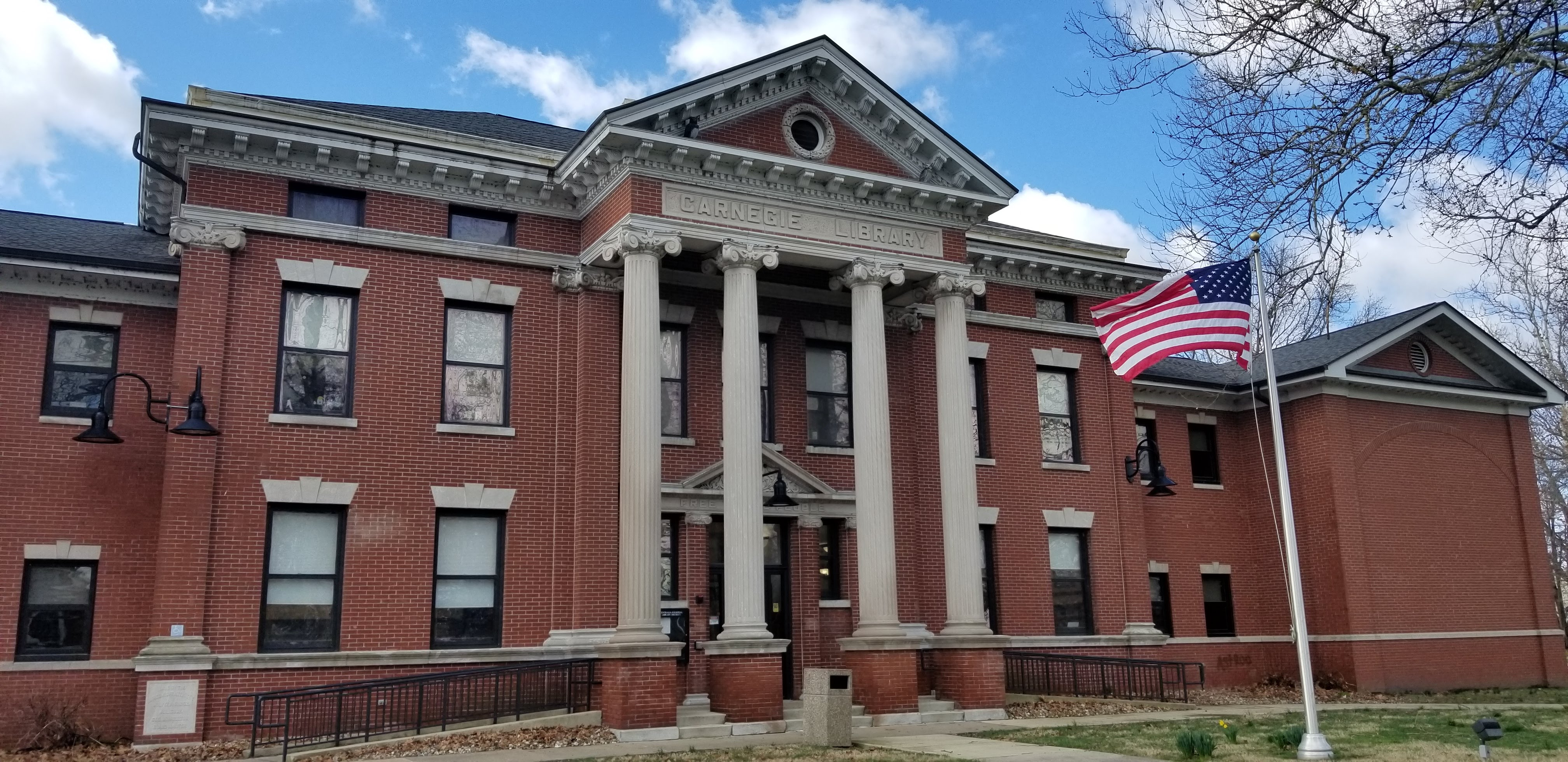
Centralia Public Library

=== Historic downtown ===
Centralia's downtown features historic architecture and has seen recent development, including the addition of a Splash Pad near the Centralia Carillon.

=== Commercial Historic District ===
In 2012, the downtown area of Centralia was added to the National Register of Historic Places. Notable historic buildings include the former Langenfeld Hotel, Centralia House restaurant, Old National Bank buildings, Sadler Opera House, Centralia Sentinel Building, and the Illinois Theater.

The Langenfeld Hotel was "established in 1912 by John Langenfield" and "became the premier hotel in the area." Images of the Langenfield Hotel have been used for postcards featuring Centralia. The name Langenfield was also connected to the historic Langenfield Motor Company buildings.

The Centralia Sentinel Building houses the Centralia Morning Sentinel newspaper and features Egyptian Revival style architecture. This may be connected to Southern Illinois' nickname of "Egypt," or "Little Egypt."

The Illinois Theater in downtown Centralia used to be a vaudeville and movie theater and is currently undergoing renovations that will enable it to seat 500 and hold professional entertainment performances.

=== The Centralia Area Historical Museum ===
The Centralia Area Historical Museum is free and contains three stories of photographs and artifacts from Centralia's extensive history as a major railway hub and mining town. The museum accepts items either as donations or through loans. In addition to the displays, the museum also contains the George Ross Library, which holds city history books, newspapers, periodicals, family histories, and genealogies.

== Parks and recreation ==
Centralia's Foundation Park is a scenic 235-acre (0.95 km^{2}) park that features hiking trails, an exercise trail, an ice skating pond, and two fishing ponds stocked with bass, bluegill, and catfish. The park also sports a restored prairie, a 36-hole disc-golf course, a Chapel in the Woods, the Hall Shelter, the Sentinel Shelter, The Bowl (an outdoor amphitheater), Moose Oven, and the Miner's Memorial.

Fairview Park includes baseball and softball fields, tennis and sand volleyball courts, a skate park, a swimming pool complex, playgrounds, and picnic shelters.

The Centralia Recreational Complex is a 60,000-square-foot recreational facility with a walking track, indoor basketball courts, competition and leisure swimming pools, weight rooms, and exercise classrooms.

Two lakes near Centralia offer water sports and fishing recreation. Raccoon Lake is a 970-acre man-made lake. It was built in 1942 and is a water reservoir. Boating and fishing are permitted on Raccoon Lake with the appropriate licenses and permits. The lake hosts the annual Outboard Power Boat Races (as sponsored by the National Boat Racing Association and Outboard Drivers Association).

Lake Centralia is a 412-acre man-made lake constructed in 1910. It is a reservoir and location for water sports activities such as boating and fishing. It has an average depth of 10 feet. It is located slightly northeast of Centralia. Largemouth bass, bluegill, crappie, and channel catfish populate the lake. Fishing licenses and boating permits are required. Fishermen are limited to two pole and line fishing. Largemouth bass fishing tournaments are held on Centralia Lake, with 28 tournaments being held in 2018.

== Education ==
Public elementary schools in Centralia include Schiller Elementary (PK–1st grade), Jordan Elementary (2nd–3rd grade), and Centralia Junior High School (4th–8th grade). According to the 2018–2019 Illinois Report Card for school districts, Schiller Elementary scored as a Lowest Performing school, Jordan Elementary as a Commendable school, and Centralia Jr. High as an Underperforming school.

Private elementary schools in Centralia include Trinity Lutheran School (K–8), affiliated with Trinity Lutheran Church, St. Mary School (Preschool and K–8), affiliated with St. Mary Catholic Church, and New Horizon Christian School (Preschool and K–8), affiliated with Greenview Christian Church.

Centralia's public high school is Centralia High School. Its sports teams are called the Orphans and Annies. The Centralia boys basketball team won its 2,000th game during the 2007–08 season, becoming the first high school basketball team in the nation to achieve that milestone. The Centralia Orphans were the State Runner-Up in the 2011 Class 3A.

The Orphans got their unique nickname during the early 1900s when the boys basketball team made it to the state tournament. The school was low on funds then, and the team was forced to pick its uniforms from a pile of non-matching red uniforms. At the state tournament, an announcer commented that the team looked like a bunch of orphans on the court because of their mismatched uniforms. The name stuck. Previously, the team had gone by nicknames such as the Reds and Cardinals. In 2013 and 2014, the Centralia Orphans were named the Most Unique Mascot in the nation by USA Today.

The private Christ Our Rock Lutheran High School first opened its doors in August 2004 with nine students. As of 2013, the student body has grown to over 100 students. Christ Our Rock is the home of the Silver Stallions.

Post-secondary education is available at Kaskaskia College, a community college serving the Centralia region. Kaskaskia College has extension centers in the surrounding towns of Vandalia, Salem, Greenville, Trenton, and Nashville. The Harry L. Crisp Technology Center, located on the east side of Centralia, houses occupational and technical programs. Kaskaskia College and its education centers also offer non-degree community education courses on subjects such as photography, gardening, and beekeeping.

Kaskaskia College is the site of the Jim Beasley Veterans Tribute, honoring veterans connected to the Kaskaskia College District 501.

The Airgo International Flight School is a professional flight training school located at the Centralia Municipal Airport.

== Government ==
=== Mayors of Centralia ===
Mayors of Centralia, Illinois

| Number | Image | Mayor | Years | Notes |
|---|---|---|---|---|
| 1 | | Matthew C. Kell | 1859–1860; 1860–1861; 1861–1862 | First mayor of Centralia |
| 2 | | Samuel Storer | 1862–1863; 1863–1864 | |
| 3 | | J. G. Cormick | 1864–1865; 1865–1866 | |
| 4 | | Blake C. Howard | 1866–1867 | |
| (2) | | Samuel Storer (2nd term) | 1867–1868; 1868–1869 | |
| 5 | | John L. Hopkins | 1869–1870 | |
| (1) | | Matthew C. Kell (2nd term) | 1870–1871 | |
| 6 | | Allen T. Barnes | 1871–1872 | |
| 7 | | L. H. Parker | 1872–1873 | |
| (2) | | Samuel Storer (3rd term) | 1873–1874 | |
| (1) | | Matthew C. Kell (3rd term) | 1874–1875 | |
| 8 | | Seymour Andrews | 1875–1876 | |
| 9 | | M. B. Saddler | 1876–1877; 1877–1878; 1878–1879; 1879–1880; 1880–1881 | |
| 10 | | James Benson | 1881–1882 | |
| (9) | | M. B. Saddler (2nd term) | 1882–1883 | |
| 11 | | Elias W. Welson | 1883–1884; 1884–1885 | |
| (9) | | M. B. Saddler (3rd term) | 1885–1886 | |
| 12 | | Berthold M. Haussler | 1886–1887; 1887–1888 | |
| 13 | | Fayette D. Rexford | 1888–1889 | |
| (9) | | M. B. Saddler (4th term) | 1889 | |
| (10) | | James Benson (2nd term) | 1889–1890 | Finished M. B. Saddler's term |
| 14 | | Henry L. Rhodes | 1890–1891; 1891–1892 | |
| 15 | | Jasper N. Kerr | 1892–1893 | |
| (10) | | James Benson (3rd term) | 1893–1894; 1894–1895 | |
| (15) | | Jasper N. Kerr (2nd term) | 1895–1896; 1896–1897 | |
| (12) | | Berthold M. Haussler (2nd term) | 1897–1898; 1898–1899 | |
| 16 | | Simpson A. Frazier | 1899–1900; 1900–1901 | |
| 17 | | Robert Rohl | 1901–1902; 1902–1903 | |
| 18 | | Norman M. Rexford | 1903–1904; 1904–1905; 1905–1906; 1906–1907 | Son of mayor Fayette D. Rexford |
| 19 | | Coral F. Lender | 1907–1908; 1908–1909 | |
| (16) | | Simpson A. Frazier | 1909–1910; 1910–1911; 1911–1912; 1912–1913 | |
| 20 | | Fred Pullen | 1913–1914; 1914–1915 | |
| (19) | | Coral F. Lender (2nd term) | 1915–1916; 1916–1917 | |
| 21 | | Harry G. Cormick | 1917–1919 | Elected to a two-year term |
| (19) | | Coral F. Lender (3rd term) | 1919–1923 | Elected to a four-year term |
| 22 | | John McNeill | 1923–1927 | |
| 23 | | G.W.E. Griffin | 1927–1931 | |
| (22) | | John McNeill (2nd term) | 1931–1935 | |
| 24 | | Louis Peifer | 1935–1939 | |
| 25 | | Wendell W. Webster | 1939–1943 | |
| 26 | | O. M. Wright | 1943–1947 | |
| 27 | | H. B. "Shorty" Blanchard | 1947–1951 | |
| 28 | | Robert M. Washburn | 1951–1955 | |
| (27) | | H. B. "Shorty" Blanchard (2nd term) | 1955–1959 | |
| 29 | | Walker Shipp | 1959–1963 | |
| | | | 1963 – ? | |
| | | Herb Williams | 2019 – 2021 | First African American mayor of Centralia |

== Infrastructure ==
=== Transportation ===
IL 161 runs east and west directly through Centralia, and US Highway 51 runs north and south through the city.

South Central Transit is the public transportation system for Centralia and surrounding areas.

The City of Centralia owns and operates the Centralia Municipal Airport, a general aviation facility that can accommodate corporate and private aircraft. The runway is 5,001 feet long. Airgo, Inc. is the fixed-base operator at the Centralia Municipal Airport.

==== Rail transportation ====
Amtrak, the national passenger rail system, provides service to Centralia. Amtrak Train 59, the southbound City of New Orleans, departs Centralia at 12:25 am daily with service to Carbondale, Fulton, Newbern-Dyersburg, Memphis, Greenwood, Yazoo City, Jackson, Hazlehurst, Brookhaven, McComb, Hammond and New Orleans. Amtrak Train 58, the northbound City of New Orleans, departs Centralia at 4:10 am daily with service to Effingham, Mattoon, Champaign-Urbana, Kankakee, Homewood and Chicago. Centralia is also served by Amtrak Train 390/391, the Saluki, daily in the morning, and Amtrak Train 392/393, the Illini, daily in the afternoon/evening. Both the Saluki and the Illini operate between Chicago and Carbondale.

=== Correctional center ===
The Centralia Correctional Center is a medium security prison for adult males opened in 1980. With an operating capacity of 1,572, its population in 2019 was 1,281.

== Notable people ==
- Chad Beguelin, playwright and four-time Tony Award nominee
- Warren Billhartz, state legislator, businessman, and lawyer
- David Blackwell, statistician and first black member of National Academy of Sciences
- James Brady, press secretary to President Ronald Reagan
- Gilbert Bundy (1911–1955), cartoonist and illustrator, born in Centralia
- Roland Burris, Illinois Attorney General, comptroller, United States senator
- Brian Dinkelman, second baseman with the Minnesota Twins
- Dike Eddleman, small forward with the Tri-Cities Blackhakws/Milwaukee Hawks and Fort Wayne Pistons
- Bryan Eversgerd, pitcher with St. Louis Cardinals and coach
- Dwight Friedrich, state legislator and businessman
- Gary Gaetti, third baseman with the 1987 World Series champion Minnesota Twins and five other MLB teams
- Dick Garrett, guard with Southern Illinois and various NBA teams
- Adruitha Lee, Academy Award-winning hairstylist for her work in the film Dallas Buyers Club
- Mary Lee, actress
- Jean Madeira, opera singer
- Bobby Joe Mason, basketball player, Bradley University and Harlem Globetrotters
- Ken "Preacher" McBride, Harlem Globetrotter
- Florence McClure, Nevada activist
- Ora A. Oldfield, Illinois state senator and businessman
- Gene Paulette, infielder for four Major League Baseball teams; born in Centralia
- Smiley Quick, golfer with the PGA Tour
- Charles W. Root, Minnesota state legislator and lawyer
- Kirk Rueter, left-handed pitcher for thirteen seasons, for the Montreal Expos and San Francisco Giants
- Nancy Scranton, golfer with the LPGA Tour
- June C. Smith, Chief Justice of the Illinois Supreme Court
- Tom Wargo, golfer with the Senior PGA Tour
- Dottie Wham, Colorado state legislator
- Robert Wham, lawyer and Colorado state legislator
