= Warren Billhartz =

American lawyer and politician

Warren O. Billhartz (January 3, 1927 – August 21, 2006) was an American lawyer and politician.

Billhartz was born in Centralia, Illinois and went to the New Baden, Illinois public schools. He served in the United States Merchant Marine during World War II. Billhartz graduated from Illinois College and Washington University School of Law. Billhartz was admitted to the Illinois and Missouri bar associations and practiced law in Belleville, Illinois. He was also involved with the banking and loan business. He was an assistant Illinois Attorney General and was involved with the Republican Party. Billhartz served on the Clinton Board of School Trustees and was the first president of the school board. Billhartz served in the Illinois House of Representatives from 1955 to 1961. He lived in Collinsville, Illinois. Billhartz died in St. Louis, Missouri
