= Ora A. Oldfield =

American businessman and politician

Ora A. Oldfied (December 18, 1893–February 8, 1963) was an American businessman and politician.

Oldfield was born in Marion County, Illinois. Oldfield served in the United States Army Signal Corps during World War I. He went to Southern Illinois University Carbondale and the American Institute of Banking. He lived in Centralia, Illinois with his wife and family. Oldfield was involved in the banking, real estate, and oil business. He also taught school and was the deputy treasurer for Madison County. Oldfield served in the Illinois Senate from 1945 to 1949 and was a Republican. Oldfield died at the Veterans Memorial Hospital in Marion, Illinois from a heart condition.
