= Centralia Municipal Airport =

- IATA: ENL; ICAO: KENL; FAA LID: ENL

Summary
- Airport type: Public
- Owner/Operator: City of Centralia
- Location: Centralia, Illinois
- Opened: April 1947; 79 years ago
- Elevation AMSL: 534 ft / 163 m
- Coordinates: 38°30′55″N 089°05′30″W

Map

Runways
Direction	Length		Surface
Direction	ft	m	Surface
18/36	5,001	1,524	Asphalt
09/27	3,300	1,006	Asphalt
- Source: AirNav.com

Centralia Municipal Airport (IATA: ENL, ICAO: KENL, FAA LID: ENL) is a U.S. general aviation airport located two nautical miles southeast of Centralia, Illinois.

== Facilities and aircraft ==
The airport has two asphalt runways: runway 18/35 is 5001 x 75 ft (1524 x 23 m), while Runway 9/27 3300 x 60 ft (1006 x 18 m).

For the 12-month period ending August 31, 2019, the airport has 77 aircraft operations per day, or about 28,000 per year. That consists of 92% general aviation, 7% air taxi, and <1% military. For the same time period, there are 39 aircraft based on the field: 31 single-engine and 8 multi-engine.

== Flight Training ==
The airport is home to the Airgo International Flight School, which provides part 141 flight training through the airline transport pilot license, FAR 135 charter operations, and has previously been an aircraft dealership and fixed-base operator. The school places focus on attracting international students on the premise that the school is cheaper and moves more quickly than its international counterparts.

== Accidents & Incidents ==
- On July 23, 2022, a Beechcraft Bonanza crashed into a pool near Centralia Municipal. One passenger was killed, and the pilot was taken to the hospital for treatment.

== See also ==
- List of airports in Illinois
- South Central Transit
- Centralia station
