= Airgo Academy =

American flight school

Airgo Academy, also known as Airgo International Flight School, is a flight school headquartered at Centralia Municipal Airport in Centralia, Illinois. The flight school specializes in training international student pilots and reportedly graduates 80 to 100 students in a typical year. The flight school has 3 additional satellite training locations in Mount Vernon, Phoenix and Veterans Airport of Southern Illinois.

The flight school is certified under 14 CFR Part 141, allowing its graduates to fly for U.S.-based airlines with a reduced number of hours on a restricted airline transport pilot license.

The school has a specialized bridge program between American and Chinese training programs, so the school has a high number of Chinese students training for their commercial licenses.

Besides a flight school, Airgo also operates an on-demand charter airline certified under 14 CFR Part 135 and previously operated as an aircraft dealership.
