= Kinmundy, Illinois =

- City
- Location in Marion County, Illinois
- Coordinates: 38°46′16″N 88°51′42″W
- Country: United States
- State: Illinois
- County: Marion
- Township: Kinmundy

Area
  - Total: 1.45 sq mi (3.76 km^{2})
  - Land: 1.20 sq mi (3.10 km^{2})
  - Water: 0.25 sq mi (0.66 km^{2})
- Elevation: 577 ft (176 m)

Population (2020)
  - Total: 733
  - Density: 611.9/sq mi (236.26/km^{2})
- Time zone: UTC-6 (CST)
  - Summer (DST): UTC-5 (CDT)
- ZIP code: 62854
- Area code: 618
- FIPS code: 17-40117
- GNIS ID: 2395542
- Website: cityofkinmundy.com

Kinmundy is a town in Marion County, Illinois, United States. The population was 733 at the 2020 census.

The town is believed to have been named after a place in Scotland, the birthplace of William Ferguson, a London agent for the Illinois Central Railroad during Kinmundy's construction. He visited the area in 1856.

== Geography ==
Kinmundy is located in northeastern Marion County. Illinois Route 37 passes through the village center as 1st Street, leading southwest 12 miles (19 km) to Salem, the county seat, and northeast 6 miles (10 km) to Farina. Interstate 57 passes northwest of the city, with access from Exit 127. I-57 leads northeast 32 miles (51 km) to Effingham and southwest 38 miles (61 km) to Mount Vernon.

According to the U.S. Census Bureau, Kinmundy has a total area of 1.45 square miles (3.76 km^{2}), of which 1.29 square miles (3.34 km^{2}) are land and 0.25 square miles (0.65 km^{2}), or 17.44%, are water. The water area consists of Kinmundy Lake, a reservoir 1 mile (1.6 km) west of the city proper. The city drains to the northwest, toward the East Fork of the Kaskaskia River.

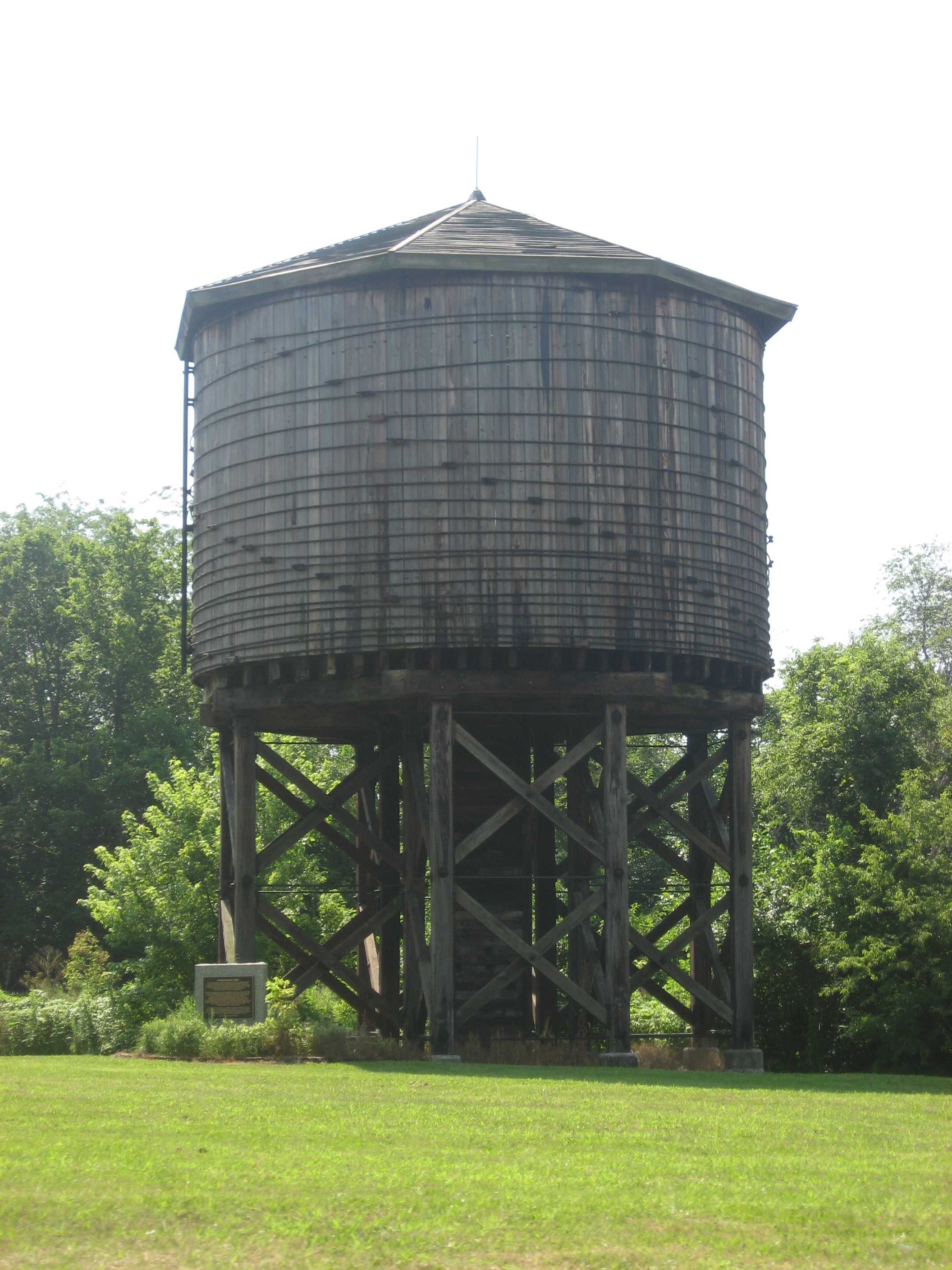
Historic Illinois Central Railroad water tower, built in 1885

== History ==
The origins of the town of Kinmundy are rooted in the expansion of the railroads in southern Illinois, with the first significant economic influence being construction work on the Chicago branch of the Illinois Central Railroad. In April 1857, the town was initially laid out east of the railroad, in 15 blocks of varying sizes, and later, incorporated as a city in 1867.

In 1903 Kinmundy was struck by a fire in the evening that burnt down most of the downtown area, causing the sharpest drop in population in the town's history. One of the buildings that burnt was the opera house, which was rebuilt before burning again for the second, and final time in 1916, not being rebuilt afterward.

In January 1912, Illinois Central Railroad train No. 3, traveling at 50 miles per hour (80 km/h), collided with passenger train No. 25, which was standing at the station in Kinmundy taking water. The devastating train wreck demolished the private car at the rear of train No. 25, killing five passengers, among them James T. Harahan, the recently retired president of the Illinois Central Railroad.

== Arts, culture, and nature ==
=== Landmarks ===
The stately Italianate Calendar Rohrbough House, located on so-called "Quality Hill", is listed on the National Register of Historic Places.

The Illinois Central Railroad Water Tower and Pump House was added to the National Register of Historic places in 1998.

The Kinmundy Log Cabin Village is a collection of twelve original pioneer homes rescued in the 1960s from the surrounding local region and reassembled in a wooded area on the edge of the town. All of the cabins pre-date the American Civil War, with the oldest originally constructed in 1818. The log cabin village plays host to an annual fall craft fair, during which the village is populated by local volunteers and crafts people in period dress and the authentically furnished homes are open to the public. Some of the volunteers are descendants of the original residents of the historic cabins.

Stephen A. Forbes State Recreation Area lies about 5 miles (8 km) southeast of the town and offers trails, camping, hunting, and fishing. The park features a man-made lake which was completed in 1968 and boasts 18 miles (29 km) of shoreline.

Some parts of Kinmundy are included in Prairie Ridge State Natural Area, a refuge for the endangered prairie chicken.

== Notable people ==
- Marilyn Kaytor, journalist and internationally known food critic; born in Kinmundy in 1929.

== Demographics ==
Historical population
Census	Pop.	Note	%±
1880	1,096		—
1890	1,045		−4.7%
1900	1,221		16.8%
1910	997		−18.3%
1920	898		−9.9%
1930	813		−9.5%
1940	1,015		24.8%
1950	912		−10.1%
1960	813		−10.9%
1970	759		−6.6%
1980	945		24.5%
1990	879		−7.0%
2000	892		1.5%
2010	796		−10.8%
2020	733		−7.9%
U.S. Decennial Census

As of the census of 2000, there were 892 people, 365 households, and 246 families residing in the city. The population density was 865.2 inhabitants per square mile (334.1/km^{2}). There were 409 housing units at an average density of 396.7 per square mile (153.2/km^{2}). The racial makeup of the city was 98.21% White, 0.34% African American, 0.11% Native American, 0.34% from other races, and 1.01% from two or more races. Hispanic or Latino of any race were 0.67% of the population.

There were 365 households, out of which 31.5% had children under the age of 18 living with them, 53.4% were married couples living together, 11.2% had a female householder with no husband present, and 32.6% were non-families. 28.2% of all households were made up of individuals, and 17.0% had someone living alone who was 65 years of age or older. The average household size was 2.44 and the average family size was 3.00.

In the city, the population was spread out, with 25.6% under the age of 18, 9.4% from 18 to 24, 25.0% from 25 to 44, 24.0% from 45 to 64, and 16.0% who were 65 years of age or older. The median age was 38 years. For every 100 females, there were 89.0 males. For every 100 females age 18 and over, there were 86.5 males.

The median income for a household in the city was $28,500, and the median income for a family was $37,125. Males had a median income of $31,875 versus $20,938 for females. The per capita income for the city was $15,279. About 10.0% of families and 12.8% of the population were below the poverty line, including 16.0% of those under age 18 and 8.8% of those age 65 or over.

Ameren's Kinmundy Power Plant, a combustion turbine generator (CTG) power plant, is located in Kinmundy.
