= Charles W. Root =

American politician (1899–1968)

Charles W. Root (October 5, 1899 – January 2, 1968) was an American lawyer and politician.

Root was raised in Centralia, Illinois. He received his bachelor's degree from University of Michigan and his law degree from the University of Minnesota Law School. Root lived in Minneapolis, Minnesota with his wife and family and practiced law in Minneapolis. Root served in the Minnesota House of Representatives from 1945 to 1950 and in the Minnesota Senate in 1951 and 1952.
