= Marilyn Kaytor =

American writer

- Born: Marilyn Miller; July 26, 1929; Kinmundy, Illinois
- Died: October 20, 2007 (aged 78); New York City, USA
- Occupations: Journalist, author
- Writing career
- Genre: Non-fiction

Marilyn Kaytor (July 26, 1929 – October 20, 2007) was an American journalist, editor and author internationally known for writing about cooking, style, and fashion.

== Life and career ==
Kaytor was born Marilyn Miller on July 26, 1929, in Kinmundy, Illinois. Her father, Arno Hugo Miller, was formerly a clerk in the Chicago Stock Yards and, later, a banking executive. Her mother, Dorcas Harvey Miller, was, at one time, a stenographer in an automobile factory. She attended local schools. In October 1951, she received her Bachelor of Science Degree in home economics from the University of Illinois. In 1952 Kaytor moved to New York City to attend graduate school at Columbia University.

Soon thereafter, Kaytor began her career as one of the first journalists to write about food for a mass audience. In the early 1950s she started writing about international cuisine and cooking for newspapers and magazines. This led to a position at Look magazine, a popular bi-weekly general interest publication.

== At Look magazine ==
For 12 years Kaytor was Look's food editor. In the era before there were professional food writers, Kaytor stood out. She conceived the ideas for her articles, traveled to scout locations, gathered props, tested recipes, and styled the photo shoots. These took her around the world.

During the 1960s, Kaytor hired prominent photographers from the fashion world to work on her photo shoots. Among these were Irving Penn, Ben Somoroff, Hiro, and Arthur Rothstein. The visually stunning food layouts were artistic enough to be added to collections in the Metropolitan Museum of Art and the Library of Congress.

At a time when Americans were just starting to wake up to foreign cuisine, notably French, she told a mass audience about cooking international dishes. She presented stories on food from the West Indies to the Balkans. For example, when Julia Child was beginning to make French cooking popular, Kaytor, in 1963, wrote that more than any other culture in the world, the French "have elevated cooking to a fine creative art." She said, "good food and wine, plus good company and conversation, are as important to the French as the quality of the music they listen to and the paintings they look at."

== Writing career ==
For almost forty years, Kaytor wrote about food and style. Despite the demise of Look in 1971, Kaytor continued to sell freelance articles. She wrote for The New York Times, Esquire, New York, the Los Angeles Times, Bon Appétit, The Saturday Evening Post, Pageant, and many others.

In 1975, Kaytor wrote "21" The Life and Times of New York's Favorite Club. The 175-page illustrated book was published by the Viking Press to wide acclaim; it remains the definitive book about the 21 Club.

In 1981, Kaytor traveled to the White House to write an article for The New York Times about the Family Dining Room. She described First Lady Nancy Reagan's taste: “Yellow is the predominant color, and she has added furniture from her California home, colorful fabrics, needlepoint pillows and a gallery of pictures of family and friends.”

== Personal life ==
Kaytor's first husband was fellow Kinmundy native Richard Maulding. They were married on June 8, 1947. The couple, both graduates of Kinmundy-Alma High School, briefly attended Southern Illinois University at Carbondale before transferring to the University of Illinois. Maulding later became an anesthesiologist, practicing in Carbondale.

Kaytor's second husband was painter Albert Kaytor, of Bay Ridge, Brooklyn, whom she met at the University of Illinois. They were married on Feb 9, 1952, at Queen of All Saints Roman Catholic Church in Fort Greene, Brooklyn. The couple lived in Brooklyn after their wedding. Albert Kaytor, an instructor at Pratt Institute, rose to become associate art director for CBS. He died in 1963.

Kaytor became involved with author and journalist Robert Ruark at this time. She lived in Ruark's villa in Palamos, Spain, and the couple was planning a wedding in 1965 when Ruark died in London of complications from alcoholism. Ruark left his Spanish estate to Kaytor, a bequest that was unsuccessfully challenged by Ruark's family in court.

Kaytor was married and divorced at least one other time: in the late 1960s to Manhattan art dealer Walter Randel.

== Death and legacy ==
On Oct 20, 2007, Kaytor was discovered dead in her second-floor apartment at 111 East 79th Street, on the Upper East Side of Manhattan. Kaytor had lived in the apartment for about thirty years. Firefighters were called to an apartment fire and found Kaytor's body in bed.

The New York Medical Examiner's office determined that Kaytor had died of natural causes, yet the fire department determined the source of the fire was likely caused by Kaytor smoking in bed.

Kaytor's remains were returned to her home state of Illinois for burial.

Following Kaytor's death, some of the contents of her apartment were sold at auction by Doyle New York. Among these were twin elephant tusks that had belonged to Robert Ruark for $25,000; an Andy Warhol piece, Untitled (Gold Shoe) sold for $205,000; and a second Warhol ink and watercolor, Untitled (Floral Still Life), for $145,000.
