= Sentinel Building (Centralia, Illinois) =

- U.S. National Register of Historic Places
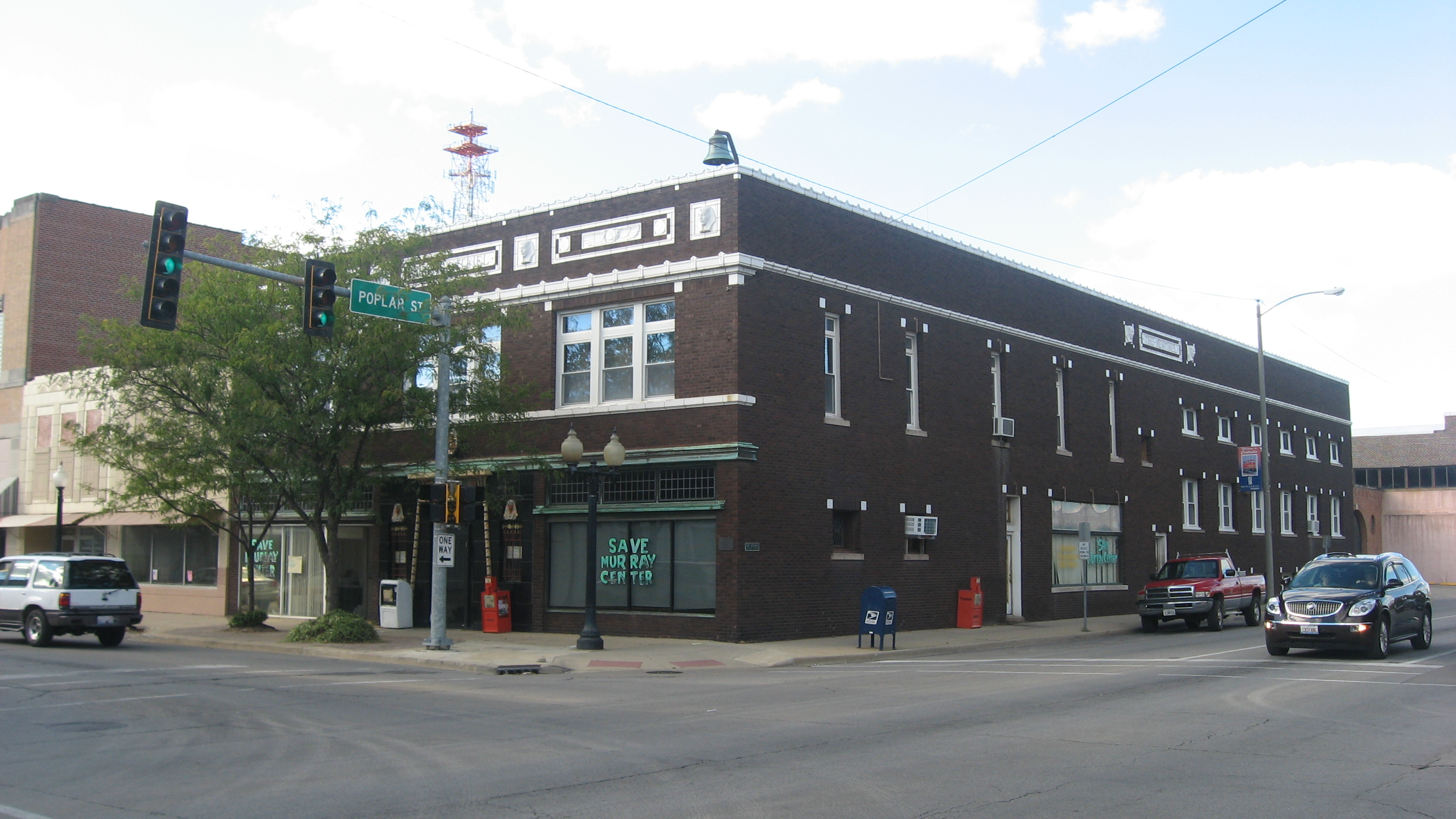
- Front and eastern side

- Location within Illinois Location within the United States
- Location: 232 E. Broadway; Centralia, Illinois
- Coordinates: 38°31′31″N 89°7′57″W
- Area: less than one acre
- Built: 1881
- Architectural style: Egyptian Revival
- NRHP reference No.: 78001169
- Added to NRHP: April 15, 1978

The Sentinel Building is a historic building located at 232 East Broadway in Centralia, Illinois. The building was constructed in 1881 to serve as the headquarters and printing press of the Centralia Sentinel, Centralia's daily newspaper. Renovations in 1922 and 1929 converted the building's design to the Egyptian Revival style; the change reflected the Sentinel's slogan, "Egypt's Greatest Daily", which was chosen since the newspaper served the Little Egypt region. The entrance to the building features yellow reed molding, pharaoh heads on either side, and a cavetto cornice. Terra cotta plaques with Egyptian motifs decorate the building's upper story, and lotus-patterned terra cotta trim adorns its parapet. The building's lobby includes an 11-foot (3.4 m) tall panel depicting a scene from the Temple of Edfu as well as Egyptian-inspired detailing.

The building was added to the National Register of Historic Places on April 15, 1978.
