= WAM Group =

- WAM Group logo
- Industry: Mechanical engineering and construction
- Founded: 1968, Italy
- Founder: Vainer Marchesini
- Headquarters: Ponte Motta di Cavezzo, Modena, Italy
- Area served: Worldwide
- Brands: Flitech; Torex); Map; Extrac; Saveco
- Number of employees: 2,500 people worldwide
- Subsidiaries: 20
- Website: www.wamgroup.it; www.wamgroup.com

WAM Group is an Italian worldwide mechanical engineering and construction company, in the development and manufacture of equipment and components for bulk material handling and treatment plants.

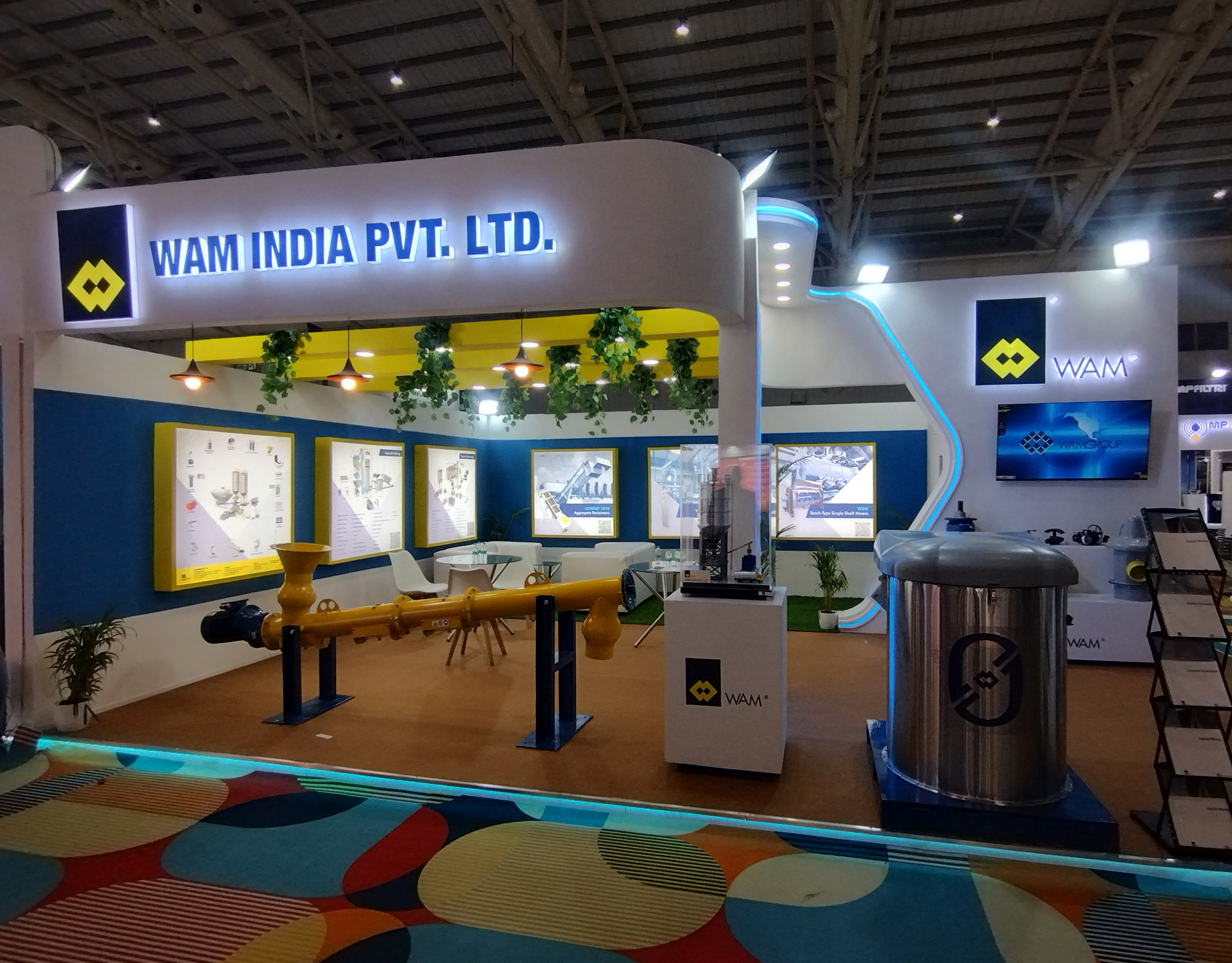
WAM India at EXCON 2025, BIEC

== Company ==
WAM Group was founded in 1968 by Vainer Marchesini, in Italy.

=== Torex ===
Engineering and manufacturing company Torex was established in 1987, within the WAM Group.
