= Wam, Pakistan =

Wam
- Location within Pakistan
- Coordinates: 30.26°N 67.27°E
- Country: Pakistan
- Elevation: 2,478 m (8,130 ft)
- Time zone: UTC+5 (PST)

Wam is a village of Ziarat District in the Balochistan province of Pakistan.

The village was badly affected by the 2008 Ziarat earthquake. Quake survivors initially tried to seek shelter from the elements in the remains of their homes as temperatures plunged below zero.
