= Frazer Free Methodist Church =

Church in Alabama, United States

Coordinates: 32°22′51.55″N 86°11′50.97″W

Frazer Church
- Frazer Free Methodist Church
- Frazer Church
- Location: 6000 Atlanta Highway, Montgomery, Al 36117
- Country: United States
- Denomination: Free Methodist
- Website: www.frazer.church

History
- Founded: 1892

Administration
- District: Southeast Region

Clergy
- Bishop: Keith Cowart

Frazer Church is a Free Methodist megachurch located at 6000 Atlanta Highway, Montgomery, Alabama. It has 4,055 members with a mission to "Make disciples of Jesus Christ for the hope of the world".

== History ==
=== Beginnings ===
Frazer Methodist Church began in 1889 in a storeroom on Holt Street, Montgomery. A local preacher held Sunday School meetings here until the group grew enough to purchase a house on Herron Street. A minister was assigned in 1892, turning the group into an organized church.

=== Growth ===
In 1978 Frazer expanded to three Sunday morning worship services, and in 1992 began broadcasting live services on television. In 1990 Frazer had the largest attendance in both Sunday School and their Sunday morning worship of any Methodist congregation in North America. In 2000 Frazer once again increased the number of its morning worship services to six. The three new services use a contemporary worship style. A Spanish service was added in 2003 with the hiring of a full-time Hispanic minister. A new building was added in 2005. This new building, Wesley Hall, is a 2,000-seat atrium that currently houses the contemporary worship services. It also includes a bookstore, coffee shop, baptistery and children's ministry facilities.

=== Connection ===
In 2022 Frazer's congregation voted to disaffiliate from the United Methodist Church and affiliate with the Free Methodist Church. The vote was ratified by the UMC Alabama-West Florida Annual Conference on June 14, 2022, and Frazer was received at that time by the Free Methodist Church. The clergy on staff also reaffiliated with the Free Methodist Church and were appointed back to Frazer Free Methodist Church by Bishop Keith Cowart of the FMC. At that time Frazer was one of only three Free Methodist congregations in Alabama. A fourth, in Phenix City, operated as a campus of a Columbus, Georgia, congregation.

== Clergy ==
Dr. Chris Montgomery was appointed to serve as senior pastor in 2020. Previous leaders include Dr. John Ed Mathison, who retired from the position of senior pastor at Frazer in June 2008 after serving in that role for 36 years. In February 2010, Tim Thompson was appointed as the new senior pastor by Bishop Paul L. Leeland. Thompson grew up in the Methodist church and is a former youth minister at Frazer. In early 2016, Thompson announced his retirement. In March 2016, Leeland appointed Larry Bryars to assume the role of senior pastor to take place the first week of July, 2016. In the summer of 2020 Rev Bryars retired and Bishop David Graves appointed Dr. Chris Montgomery to take the role of senior pastor of Frazer. Other clergy currently appointed to Frazer include Dr. Neil Epler, Rev. Mario Aman, and Dr. Jimmy Jeffcoat.
