= Methodist Episcopal Church (Salem, Illinois) =

Historic church in Illinois, United States

- U.S. National Register of Historic Places
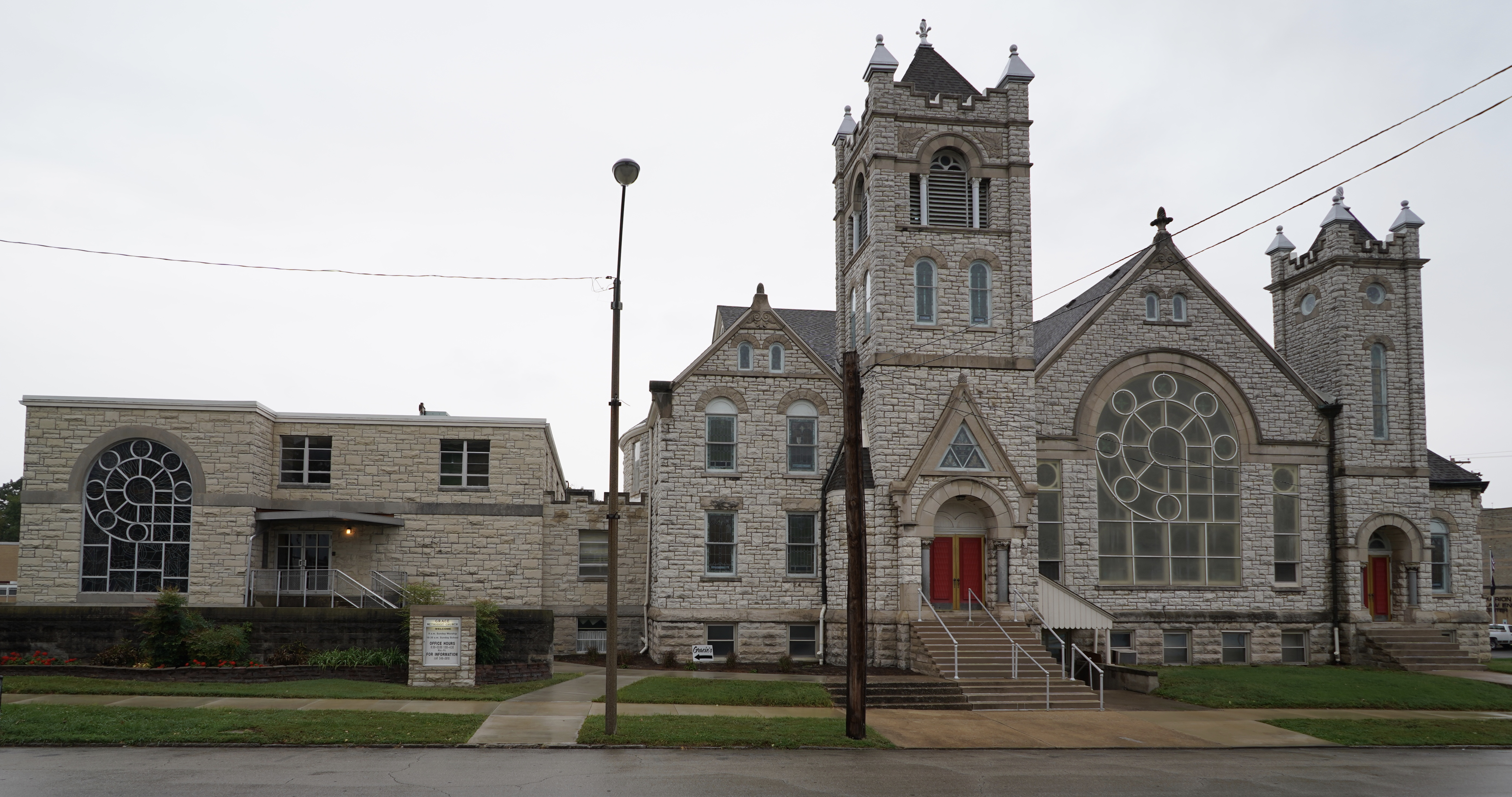

- Location within Illinois Location within the United States
- Location: 116 E. Schwartz St., Salem, Illinois
- Coordinates: 38°37′40″N 88°56′42″W
- Built: 1907
- Architect: Charles Henry and Son
- Architectural style: Richardsonian Romanesque
- NRHP reference No.: 100002823
- Added to NRHP: August 28, 2018

The Methodist Episcopal Church is a historic church at 116 E. Schwartz Street in Salem, Illinois. The church was built in 1907 for Salem's congregation of the Methodist Episcopal Church; the congregation had to raise the funds for the church twice, as its treasurer stole the original funds during its construction. Architects Charles Henry and Son of Ohio designed the church in the Richardsonian Romanesque style. Their design includes a rusticated stone exterior, a large rounded window, arched entrances supported by stone columns, and two square towers. An education building with a matching rounded window was added to the west end of the church in 1960. Interior designer and church member Vi Mueller redesigned the church's sanctuary in 1968; her design repurposed household items to create elaborate decorations at a low cost.

The church was added to the National Register of Historic Places on August 28, 2018.
