= Badollet House =

Historic house in Illinois, United States

- U.S. National Register of Historic Places
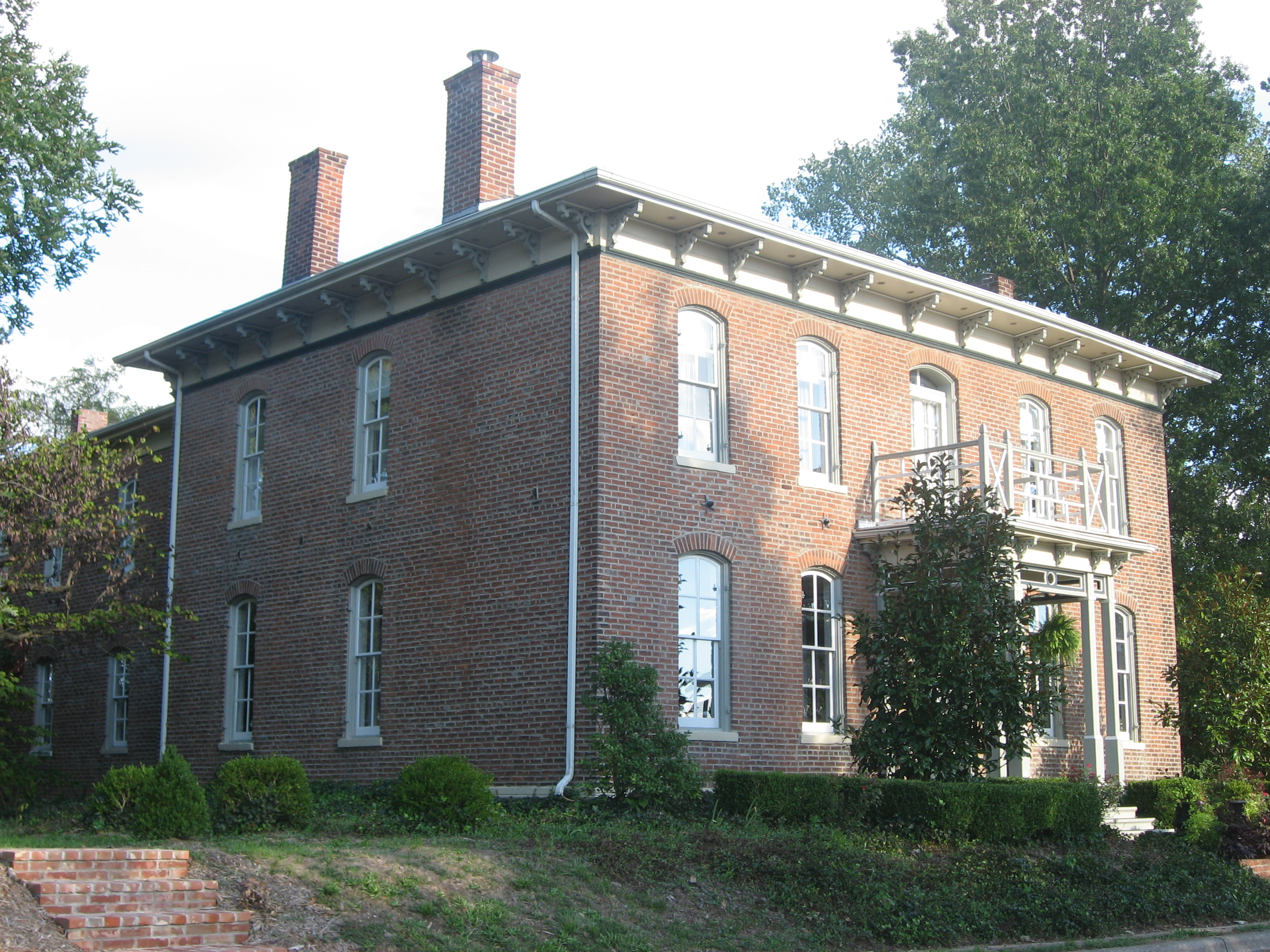
- Front and northern side of the house

- Location within Illinois Location within the United States
- Location: 310 N. Washington St., Salem, Illinois
- Coordinates: 38°37′42″N 88°56′53″W
- Area: 1 acre (0.40 ha)
- Built: 1854-55
- Architectural style: Italianate
- NRHP reference No.: 90001839
- Added to NRHP: December 6, 1990

The Badollet House is one of three properties listed on the National Register of Historic Places in the Marion County, Illinois county seat of Salem. The house was built for businessman Howard Badollet and his wife. The house was designed in the Italianate style and is the only surviving Italianate home in Salem. The two-story brick house consists of a front section completed in 1854 and a rear wing finished the following year. The decorative elements of the house were most likely added in the 1860s or 1870s. The house's hip roof features overhanging eaves and a bracketed cornice. The original front porch was replaced by a simpler two-story porch around 1900.

The house was added to the National Register of Historic Places on December 6, 1990.
