= Salem, Illinois =

- City
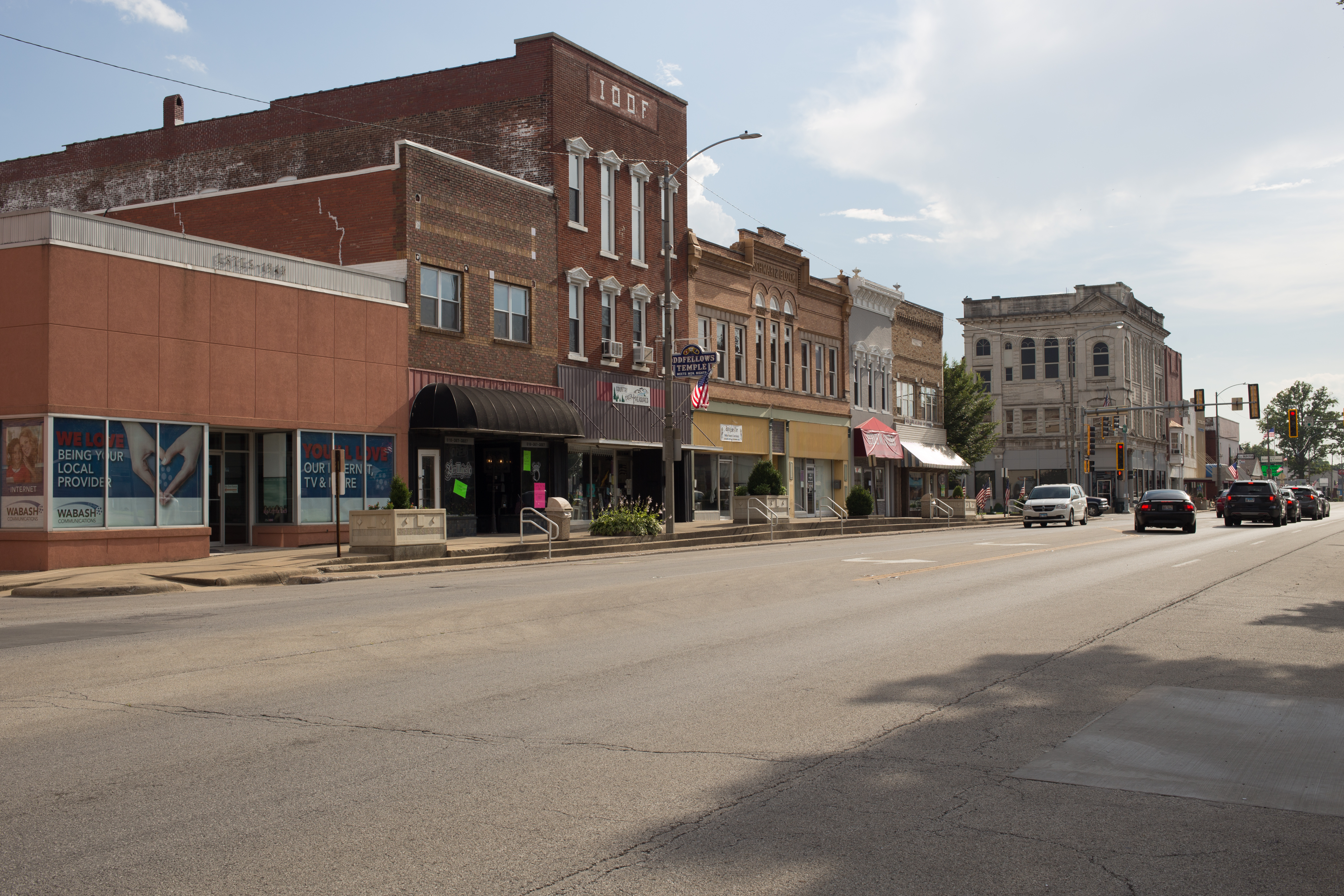
- Downtown Salem, July 2019
- Interactive map of Salem, Illinois
- Location within Illinois Location within the United States
- Coordinates: 38°37′34″N 89°00′06″W
- Country: United States
- State: Illinois
- County: Marion
- Townships: Salem, Tonti

Government
  - Mayor: Nicolas Farley

Area
  - Total: 7.15 sq mi (18.51 km^{2})
  - Land: 6.99 sq mi (18.11 km^{2})
  - Water: 0.15 sq mi (0.40 km^{2})
- Elevation: 545 ft (166 m)

Population (2020)
  - Total: 7,282
  - Density: 1,041.6/sq mi (402.18/km^{2})
- Time zone: UTC-6 (CST)
  - Summer (DST): UTC-5 (CDT)
- ZIP code: 62881
- Area code: 618
- FIPS code: 17-67236
- GNIS ID: 2396526
- Website: www.salemil.us

Salem is a city in and the county seat of Marion County, Illinois, United States. The population was 7,282 at the 2020 census.

== History ==
Salem was founded in 1823 as the county seat of the newly formed Marion County. It is situated halfway between the Indiana and Missouri borders on what was originally the Vincennes-St. Louis Road, now U.S. Highway 50.

Salem was formerly a sundown town. For decades, Salem had signs on each main road going into town telling African Americans that they were not allowed in town after sundown.

In the late 1930s, production increased in local oil fields, leading to a significant population increase in the city.

== Geography ==
Salem is located in central Marion County. U.S. Route 50 passes through the city center as Main Street, leading east 26 miles (42 km) to Flora and west 23 miles (37 km) to Carlyle. Illinois Route 37 (Broadway) crosses US 50 in the center of town, leading north 7 miles (11 km) to Alma and south 15 miles (24 km) to Dix. Interstate 57 passes through the west side of Salem, with access from Exit 116 (US 50); the Interstate leads northeast 45 miles (72 km) to Effingham and south 21 miles (34 km) to Mount Vernon.

According to the U.S. Census Bureau, Salem has a total area of 7.15 square miles (18.52 km^{2}), of which 6.99 square miles (18.10 km^{2}) are land and 0.16 square miles (0.41 km^{2}), or 2.17%, are water. Town Creek flows through the east side of the city, running to Crooked Creek just south of the city limits. Via Crooked Creek, Salem is part of the Kaskaskia River watershed.

=== Climate ===
Climate data for Salem, Illinois (1991–2020 normals, extremes 1932–present)
Month	Jan	Feb	Mar	Apr	May	Jun	Jul	Aug	Sep	Oct	Nov	Dec	Year
Record high °F (°C)	71 (22)	78 (26)	90 (32)	91 (33)	100 (38)	104 (40)	105 (41)	105 (41)	101 (38)	94 (34)	82 (28)	74 (23)	105 (41)
Mean maximum °F (°C)	61.0 (16.1)	66.6 (19.2)	75.3 (24.1)	82.2 (27.9)	88.0 (31.1)	93.9 (34.4)	95.4 (35.2)	95.1 (35.1)	91.4 (33.0)	85.2 (29.6)	72.9 (22.7)	62.8 (17.1)	97.1 (36.2)
Mean daily maximum °F (°C)	38.4 (3.6)	43.4 (6.3)	54.0 (12.2)	66.2 (19.0)	75.7 (24.3)	84.5 (29.2)	87.8 (31.0)	86.6 (30.3)	80.4 (26.9)	68.7 (20.4)	54.3 (12.4)	42.8 (6.0)	65.2 (18.4)
Daily mean °F (°C)	29.6 (−1.3)	33.7 (0.9)	43.5 (6.4)	55.0 (12.8)	65.2 (18.4)	74.2 (23.4)	77.6 (25.3)	75.9 (24.4)	68.6 (20.3)	56.9 (13.8)	44.1 (6.7)	34.2 (1.2)	54.9 (12.7)
Mean daily minimum °F (°C)	20.8 (−6.2)	24.0 (−4.4)	33.0 (0.6)	43.7 (6.5)	54.6 (12.6)	63.8 (17.7)	67.4 (19.7)	65.2 (18.4)	56.9 (13.8)	45.0 (7.2)	34.0 (1.1)	25.6 (−3.6)	44.5 (6.9)
Mean minimum °F (°C)	1.0 (−17.2)	7.1 (−13.8)	16.5 (−8.6)	29.9 (−1.2)	40.6 (4.8)	51.9 (11.1)	58.8 (14.9)	56.8 (13.8)	43.8 (6.6)	30.8 (−0.7)	20.1 (−6.6)	8.2 (−13.2)	−2.0 (−18.9)
Record low °F (°C)	−23 (−31)	−23 (−31)	−8 (−22)	20 (−7)	31 (−1)	38 (3)	48 (9)	44 (7)	33 (1)	21 (−6)	2 (−17)	−20 (−29)	−23 (−31)
Average precipitation inches (mm)	3.07 (78)	2.56 (65)	3.73 (95)	4.69 (119)	4.99 (127)	5.08 (129)	4.07 (103)	3.80 (97)	3.54 (90)	3.44 (87)	3.99 (101)	2.93 (74)	45.89 (1,166)
Average snowfall inches (cm)	3.9 (9.9)	2.5 (6.4)	0.2 (0.51)	0.0 (0.0)	0.0 (0.0)	0.0 (0.0)	0.0 (0.0)	0.0 (0.0)	0.0 (0.0)	0.1 (0.25)	0.6 (1.5)	2.9 (7.4)	10.2 (26)
Average precipitation days (≥ 0.01 in)	9.5	8.3	9.8	10.6	11.8	10.0	8.5	8.1	7.1	8.7	9.3	9.3	111.0
Average snowy days (≥ 0.1 in)	2.4	2.0	0.6	0.0	0.0	0.0	0.0	0.0	0.0	0.0	0.4	1.6	7.0
Source: NOAA

== Demographics ==
=== Racial and ethnic composition ===
Salem, Illinois – Racial and ethnic composition Note: the US Census treats Hispanic/Latino as an ethnic category. This table excludes Latinos from the racial categories and assigns them to a separate category. Hispanics/Latinos may be of any race.
Race / Ethnicity (NH = Non-Hispanic)	Pop 2000	Pop 2010	Pop 2020	% 2000	% 2010	% 2020
White alone (NH)	7,638	7,120	6,538	96.57%	95.12%	89.78%
Black or African American alone (NH)	57	78	93	0.72%	1.04%	1.27%
Native American or Alaska Native alone (NH)	23	15	12	0.29%	0.20%	0.16%
Asian alone (NH)	90	81	69	1.14%	1.08%	0.95%
Native Hawaiian or Pacific Islander alone (NH)	3	2	0	0.04%	0.03%	0.00%
Other race alone (NH)	3	4	13	0.04%	0.05%	0.18%
Mixed race or Multiracial (NH)	38	86	402	0.48%	1.15%	5.52%
Hispanic or Latino (any race)	57	99	155	0.72%	1.32%	2.13%
Total	7,909	7,485	7,282	100.00%	100.00%	100.00%

Historical population
Census	Pop.	Note	%±
1870	1,182		—
1880	1,327		12.3%
1890	1,493		12.5%
1900	1,642		10.0%
1910	2,669		62.5%
1920	3,457		29.5%
1930	4,420		27.9%
1940	7,319		65.6%
1950	6,159		−15.8%
1960	6,165		0.1%
1970	6,187		0.4%
1980	7,813		26.3%
1990	7,470		−4.4%
2000	7,909		5.9%
2010	7,485		−5.4%
2020	7,282		−2.7%
U.S. Decennial Census

=== 2020 census ===
As of the 2020 census, Salem had a population of 7,282. The median age was 40.2 years. 23.0% of residents were under the age of 18 and 21.9% of residents were 65 years of age or older. For every 100 females there were 93.4 males, and for every 100 females age 18 and over there were 89.5 males age 18 and over.

97.0% of residents lived in urban areas, while 3.0% lived in rural areas.

There were 3,084 households in Salem, of which 27.8% had children under the age of 18 living in them. Of all households, 38.2% were married-couple households, 20.5% were households with a male householder and no spouse or partner present, and 33.4% were households with a female householder and no spouse or partner present. About 36.8% of all households were made up of individuals and 18.6% had someone living alone who was 65 years of age or older.

There were 3,380 housing units, of which 8.8% were vacant. The homeowner vacancy rate was 2.4% and the rental vacancy rate was 8.5%.

=== 2000 census ===
At the 2000 census there were 7,909 people in 3,249 households, including 2,082 families, in the city. The population density was 1,296.5 inhabitants per square mile (500.6/km^{2}). There were 3,473 housing units at an average density of 569.3 per square mile (219.8/km^{2}). The racial makeup of the city was 97.13% White, 0.72% African American, 0.30% Native American, 1.15% Asian, 0.04% Pacific Islander, 0.14% from other races, and 0.52% from two or more races. Hispanic or Latino of any race were 0.72%.

Of the 3,249 households, 28.6% had children under the age of 18 living with them, 48.8% were married couples living together, 11.0% had a female householder with no husband present, and 35.9% were non-families. 32.3% of households were one person and 17.2% were one person aged 65 or older. The average household size was 2.32 and the average family size was 2.91.

The age distribution was 23.5% under the age of 18, 8.7% from 18 to 24, 26.1% from 25 to 44, 22.1% from 45 to 64, and 19.6% 65 or older. The median age was 39 years. For every 100 females, there were 87.6 males. For every 100 females age 18 and over, there were 83.9 males.

The median household income was $34,339 and the median family income was $42,070. Males had a median income of $31,811 versus $21,931 for females. The per capita income for the city was $16,954. About 6.1% of families and 9.2% of the population were below the poverty line, including 13.2% of those under age 18 and 9.2% of those age 65 or over.

== Education ==
Public schools:

- Salem Community High School
- Salem Elementary School District 111, which is split into two separate schools:
  - Hawthorn, a Kindergarten through 3rd grade school.
  - Franklin Park, a 4th through 8th grade school.
- Selmaville Elementary School

== Notable people ==
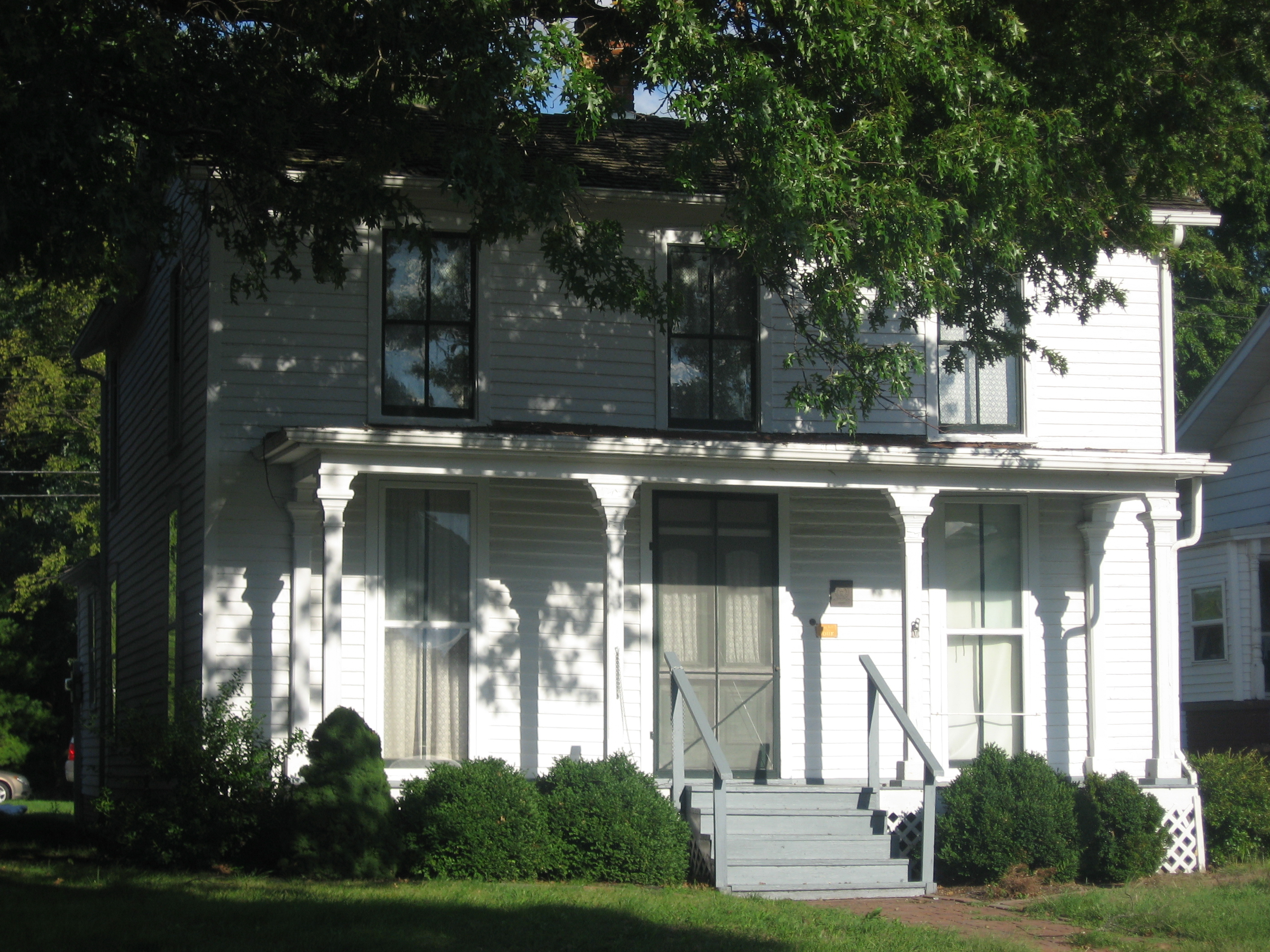
Birthplace of William Jennings Bryan

- Jim Bredar, basketball player for 1950–51 Illinois team
- Charles W. Bryan, 20th and 23rd governor of Nebraska
- William Jennings Bryan, 41st US Secretary of State and U.S. presidential candidate
- Ryan Burge, political scientist, statistician, and pastor; born in Salem
- Jim Finks, pro football player and executive; attended high school in Salem
- Merle Harmon, sports broadcaster; born in Salem
- Bill Laswell, bassist, producer, and record label owner
- Jess Marlow, television journalist; born in Salem
- Riley Martin, relief pitcher for the Chicago Cubs
- Rockette Morton, musician and bassist with Captain Beefheart and The Magic Band
- John T. Scopes, science teacher who defended the teaching of evolution at the Scopes Trial
- Morrie Steevens, pitcher for Chicago Cubs and Philadelphia Phillies
- Erastus D. Telford, Illinois state senator and lawyer

== Arts and culture ==
Salem is home to four buildings on the National Register of Historic Places: the Charles and Naomi Bachmann House, the Badollet House, the William Jennings Bryan Boyhood Home, and Grace Methodist Church.

President Franklin D. Roosevelt delivered an address on May 3, 1934, dedicating a statue of William Jennings Bryan created by Gutzon Borglum. The statue originally stood in Washington, D.C., but was displaced by highway construction in 1961 and moved to Salem, Bryan's birthplace, with formal Congressional approval in 1974.

== See also ==
- List of sundown towns in the United States
