= William Jennings Bryan Boyhood Home =

Historic house in Illinois, United States

- U.S. National Register of Historic Places
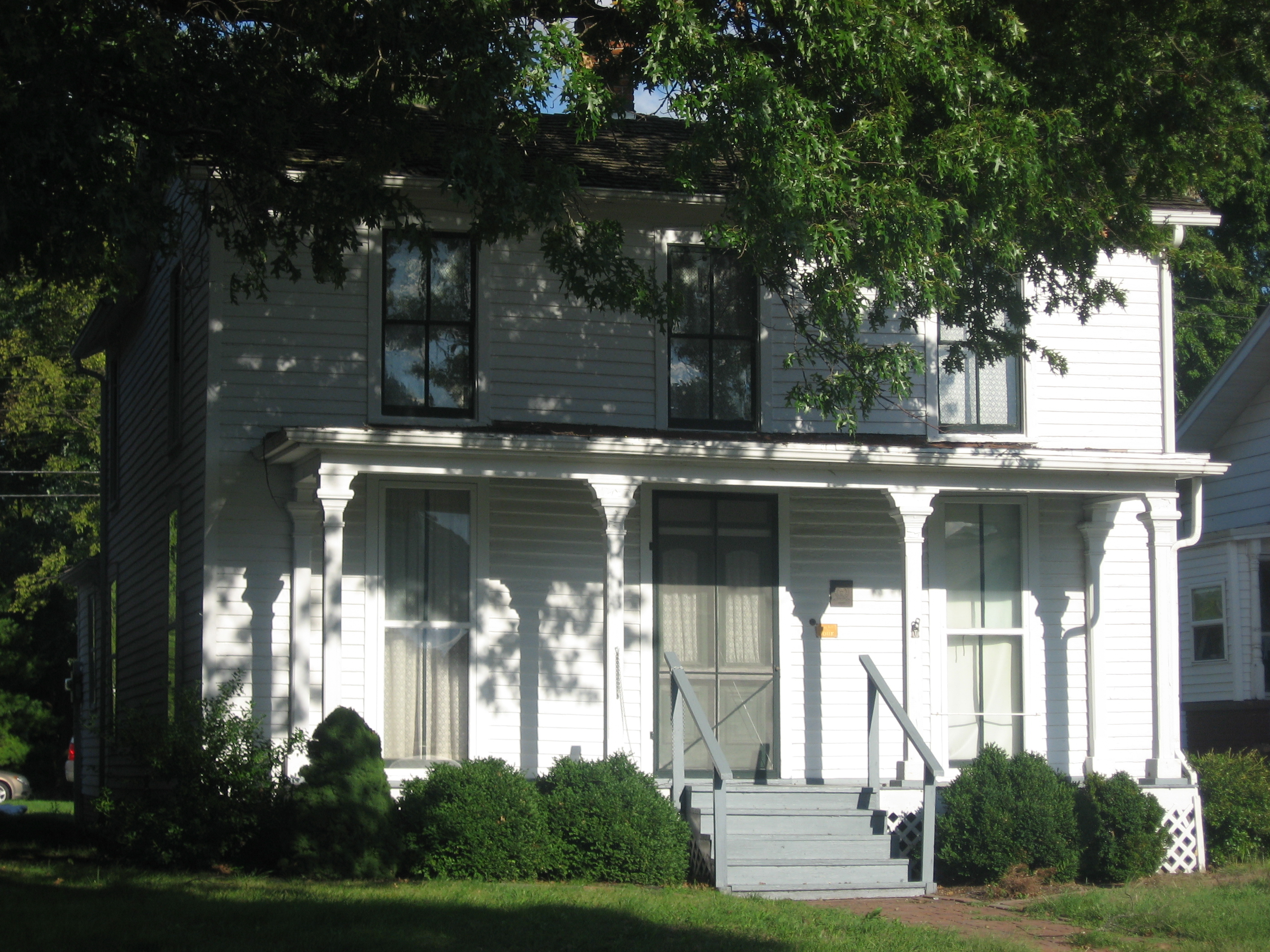
- Front of the house

- Location within Illinois Location within the United States
- Location: 408 S. Broadway, Salem, Illinois
- Coordinates: 38°37′42″N 88°56′53″W
- Area: 0.4 acres (0.16 ha)
- Built: 1852
- NRHP reference No.: 75000668
- Added to NRHP: February 18, 1975

The William Jennings Bryan Boyhood Home is a historic house located at 408 S. Broadway in Salem, Illinois. The house was the birthplace and boyhood home of William Jennings Bryan, three-time Democratic Party nominee for president. The two-story frame house was built in 1852 for Silas Bryan, an Illinois State Senator and father of William Jennings Bryan. William Jennings Bryan was born in the home in 1860.

The city of Salem operates the home as a museum, including information and memorabilia about Bryan, his politics and his times. Bryan himself donated the house to the city in the early 1900s, as he wished for it to become a museum. The house features two main rooms in the front, a kitchen and a dining room in back, and three bedrooms upstairs.

The house was listed on the National Register of Historic Places in 1975.
