= Robert Wham =

American politician

Robert Shanklin Wham (January 18, 1926 – December 21, 2011) was an American lawyer and politician.

== Background ==
Wham was born in Centralia, Illinois. He married Dorothy Stonecipher in 1947. Wham graduated from University of Illinois College of Law and moved with his wife to Colorado and settled in Montrose, Colorado in 1950 where he practiced law. In 1953, Wham moved to Denver, Colorado, with his wife and family, and served in the office of the Colorado Attorney General. He also served as an assistant United States District Attorney and as the Denver City Attorney. Wham continued to practice law in Denver. Wham served in the Colorado Senate from 1977 to 1980 and was a Republican. His wife Dottie also served in the Colorado General Assembly.
