= Calendar Rohrbough House =

Historic house in Illinois, United States

- U.S. National Register of Historic Places
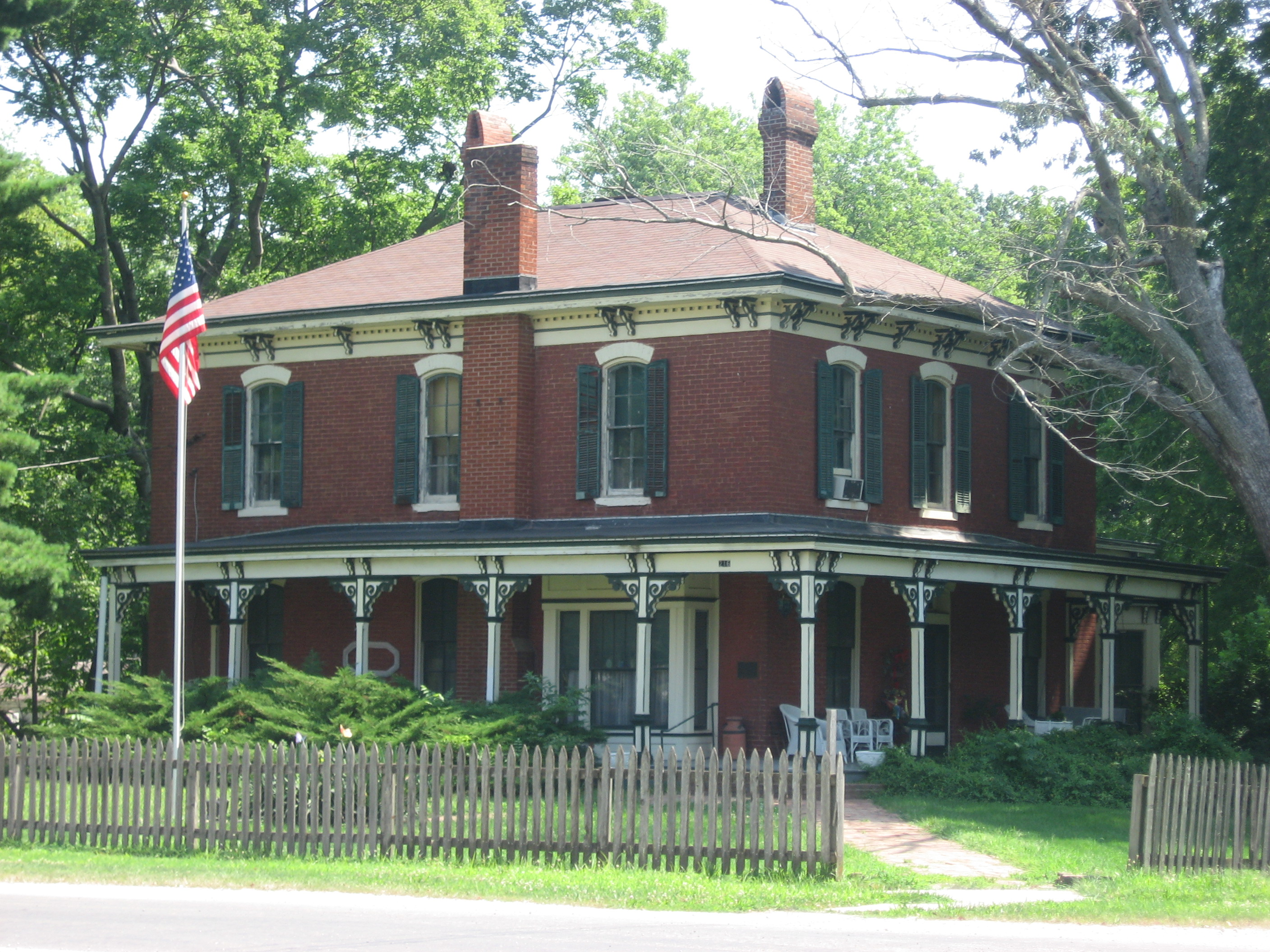
- View from the southwest

- Location within Illinois Location within the United States
- Location: 3rd and Washington Sts., Kinmundy, Illinois
- Coordinates: 38°46′17″N 88°50′42″W
- Area: less than one acre
- Built: 1875
- Architectural style: Italianate
- NRHP reference No.: 79000857
- Added to NRHP: September 6, 1979

The Calendar Rohrbough House is a historic house located at 3rd and Washington Streets in Kinmundy, Illinois. The Italianate house was built in 1875 for Calendar Rohrbough, a local merchant and politician. It was added to the National Register of Historic Places in 1979.

== Architecture ==
The house is designed in the Italianate style. A verandah wraps around the south and west sides of the house; the verandah features scroll brackets on its cornice and at the top of its supporting posts. Scroll brackets also decorate the cornice of the house's hip roof. The house's exterior windows are tall, narrow, and topped by arched brick lintels. The interior of the house features several rooms arranged around a central hallway and staircase; the rooms are decorated with oak trim, and the doors are topped with oak grilles. The Illinois Historic Structures Survey named the house as the best surviving example of the style in Kinmundy.

== History ==
The house's first owner, Calendar Rohrbough, was born in Upshur County, Virginia and moved to Kinmundy in 1857. He served in the Civil War for the Union Army from 1862 to 1865, achieving the rank of captain as a member of the 118th Illinois Volunteer Infantry Regiment. After returning to Kinmundy, Rohrbough founded the Kinmundy First National Bank and the Kinmundy Savings and Loan Association. He was also active in politics and was elected mayor of Kinmundy before attempting a run for U.S. Congress in 1888. After Rohrbough's death, Fred O. Grissom purchased the house in 1925. Grissom also served as mayor of Kinmundy; in addition, he served as the city's postmaster for twenty-three years and as editor and publisher of the Kinmundy Express for eighteen. Grissom lived in the house until his death in 1978.

The house was added to the National Register of Historic Places on September 6, 1979.
