= Dottie Wham =

American politician (1925–2019)

Dorothy Wham (née Stonecipher; January 5, 1925 – October 20, 2019) was an American politician from the state of Colorado.

== Early life ==
Wham was born on January 5, 1925, as Dorothy Stonecipher, in Centralia, Illinois. She graduated from MacMurray College, earning her bachelor's degree in 1946. She married her high school sweetheart, Robert Wham, in 1947, and earned her master's degree from the University of Illinois in 1949.

In 1950, they moved to Montrose, Colorado, where her husband practiced law. In 1953, Wham and her husband moved to Denver, Colorado where her husband continued to practice law. She became involved in politics in 1952, volunteering for the campaign of moderate Republican presidential candidate Dwight Eisenhower, while she first got involved in public policy working on immunization of children.

== Political career ==
From 1972 to 1980, she served on the Colorado Civil Rights Commission. Her husband was elected to one term as a state senator from 1976 to 1978.

Wham was elected to her first term in the Colorado House in 1984, serving until 1987. She was appointed to the state senate in November 1987 to finish out an unexpired term of a senator who left to become a lobbyist; she was elected three times in her own right, but was term-limited in 2000. She was chairperson of the Senate Judiciary Committee from the 1989 to 2000, and involved mostly in health policy, including AIDS, mental health, service animals for people with disabilities, and breast cancer.

A moderate Republican on social issues, Wham supported abortion rights and state funding of HIV health care, as well as needle exchanges.

She was called “The grande dame” of the Colorado state legislature. In 2000, as she prepared to retire due to term limits, she won a legislator of the year award from the Colorado Trial Lawyers Association, and the "Public Service Lifetime Achievement Award" from the Colorado Nonprofit Association.

== Family and death ==
Wham and her husband Robert S. Wham were childhood sweethearts and were married until his death. They had three children, Nancy Mitchell, Jeanne Ryan, and Robert S. Wham II. Wham died on October 20, 2019, aged 94.
