= Ryan Burge (political scientist) =

American political scientist

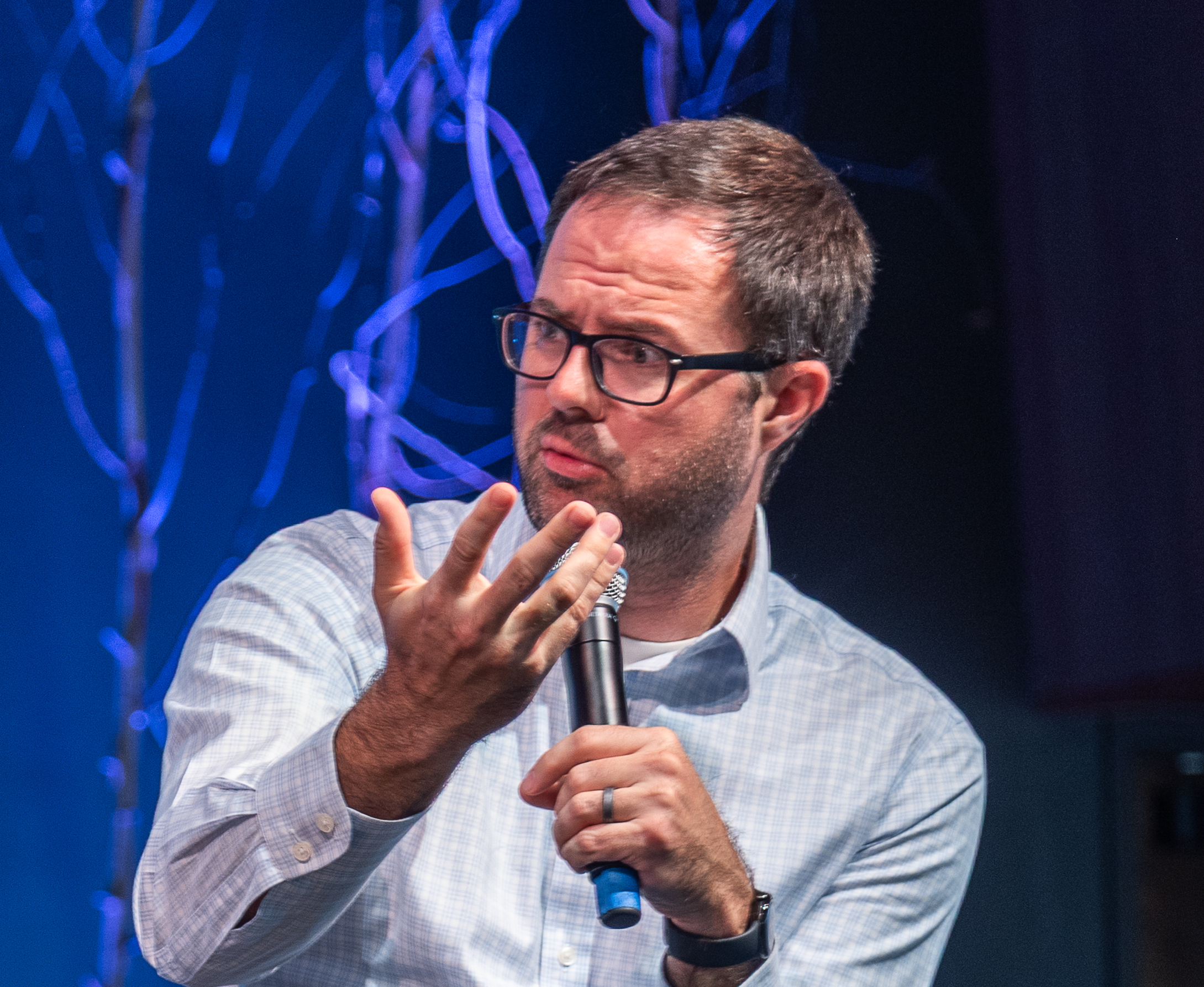
- Burge speaks at a Portland Seminary event in 2025.
- Born: 1982 (age 43–44)
- Title: Professor of Practice

Academic background
- Education: Greenville College (B.A.), Southern Illinois University Carbondale (M.A., Ph.D.)
- Alma mater: Southern Illinois University Carbondale
- Thesis: Religion and Political Behavior: Studies of Political Tolerance, Voting, and Public Opinion (2011)
- Doctoral advisor: J. Tobin Grant

Academic work
- Discipline: Political scientist, statistician
- Sub-discipline: American religion
- Institutions: Washington University in St. Louis (2025 - present); Eastern Illinois University (2012 - 2025)
- Website: drburge.com graphsaboutreligion.com

Ryan P. Burge (born 1982) is an American political scientist, statistician, and former pastor. He is currently a professor of practice at Washington University in St. Louis in the John C. Danforth Centre on religion and politics.

== Early life ==
Burge began to be involved in the church at around 14 years of age in which he took part in a vote which would freeze the salary of his Church, the First Baptist Church of Salem in Illinois.

== Career ==
For 17 years until summer 2024, Burge was pastor at an American Baptist church in Mount Vernon, Illinois. He is currently a professor of practice at Washington University in St. Louis, and works in the John C. Danforth Center on Religion and Politics. He had previously been an associate professor at Eastern Illinois University, and is best known for his work on religion in the United States. 60 Minutes has termed him one of the "leading data analysts on religion and politics" within the United States.

== Views ==
Burge has argued that secular voters represent a growing force in American politics. His research finds that the majority of "nones" have religion-like beliefs and believe in some conception of a higher power, despite not affiliating with a religion. According to Burge, over 30% of people are "nones" compared to 5% in 1972. Burge has argued that the term "evangelical" is becoming more descriptive of politics than religion, particularly that of conservatism, rather than its traditional association with adherence to evangelical theology.

In Burge's book The Vanishing Church, he argued that it has become rarer for congregations of both Democrats and Republicans to come together. He argues that this has been caused by increasing hostility to religion in the liberal part of society contrasted to increasing conservatism within the Christian movement. In his book, he writes that people are going to church to affirm their political views rather than for religious reasons. He further argues that Christian congregations are declining such as his own due to less young people going to church. In an America Magazine article on him, they call this phenoma "polarization". Although Burge talks about decreasing congregations, he admitted that for every seven Americans who believed in God, there was one who didn't. In an interview with the Commonweal magazine, Burge said that the issue was that there were no longer congregations with mixed religious views. He believes that this has a widespread effect on society and politics by people only interacting with those with similar views and losing the skills for engaging with different points of view. In the interview, he added that diversity in ideas was important for democracy.

== Bibliography ==
- The Nones: Where They Came From, Who They Are, and Where They Are Going (Fortress Press, 2021) ISBN 9781506465852
- 20 Myths about Religion and Politics in America (Fortress Press, 2022) ISBN 9781506482019
- (with Collin Hansen, Jim Davis, and Michael Graham) The Great Dechurching: Who's Leaving, Why Are They Going, and What Will It Take to Bring Them Back? (Zondervan, 2023) ISBN 9780310147435
- The American Religious Landscape: Facts, Trends, and the Future (Oxford University Press, 2025) ISBN 9780197762844
- The Vanishing Church: How the Hollowing Out of Moderate Congregations Is Hurting Democracy, Faith, and Us (Brazos Press, 2026) ISBN 9781587436697
- (with Michael Graham) The Great American Church Migration: A Landmark Study of How, Why, and When People Switch Faiths (Zondervan, 2027) ISBN 9780310176343)
