= Frederick O. Bemm =

American photographer

Frederick O. Bemm (April 4, 1877 - January 6, 1944) was a photographer in Chicago known for his photographs of artworks, people, and buildings. As staff photographer for the Art Institute of Chicago he captured many art works in photographs. He later established his own studio. Several institutions including the Chicago History Museum have collections of his work.

Bemm was a staff photographer for the Art Institute of Chicago before establishing his own studio. Bemm purchased the home of landscape painter and Art Institute professor Charles Edward Boutwood.

== Work ==
His work includes lantern slides and Autochrome photographs. The Smithsonian has a photograph of a class taught by Mary H Buehr at the Art Institute that was taken by Bemm.

The Chicago History Museum's collection includes 471 negatives of Chicago buildings including the Art Institute of Chicago, Church of the Disciples, Dearborn Station, the Field Museum, Montgomery Ward Tower, Pure Oil & Jeweler's Building, Railway Exchange Building, Studebaker Hall Theater, and the Tavern Club as well as residential buildings owned by Max Epstein, Robert Mandel, Potter Palmer, Jos. Peters, Jules Raymond, J. B. Shaw, Benjamin Squire, P.A. Starch, Dudley Craft Watson, James V. R. Willett and various monuments in Jackson and Lincoln Parks as well as College in the Hills in Herod, Illinois and St. Mary of the Lake Seminary in Mundelein, Illinois plus images of agricultural equipment and the Pontiac automobile service station and the Chalberg family that ran it. The Art Institute also has a large collection of his work including photographs of architectural projects by Edward H. Bennett and views of.various buildings including the Blackstone Hotel, Blair Building in New York City, Gorham Building, a Corn Exchange Bank building, buildings at the Panama–Pacific International Exposition, various chapels, monuments, statues, residential building exterior and interior shots, and panoramas.

== Burial ==
He is buried at Crown Hill Cemetery in Knox, Indiana.
