= Heyworth Building =

Office skyscraper in Chicago, Illinois

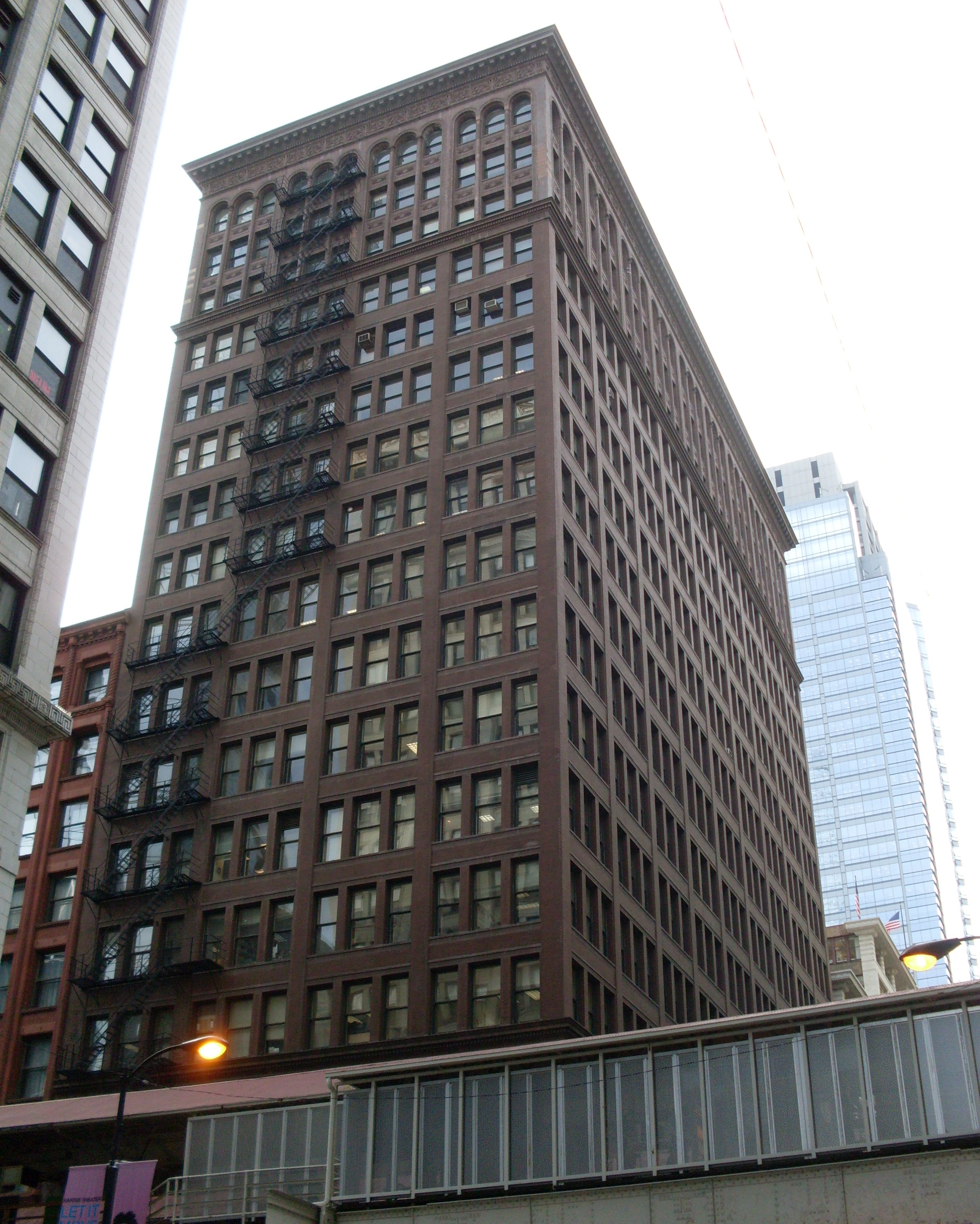
- Interactive map of the Heyworth Building area

General information
- Location: 29 E. Madison Street, Chicago, Illinois, United States
- Coordinates: 41.8819°N 87.6267°W
- Opened: 1904

Technical details
- Floor count: 19
- Floor area: 256,000 square feet (23,800 m^{2})

Design and construction
- Architect: Frederick P. Dinkelberg
- Architecture firm: D. H. Burnham & Company

Chicago Landmark
- Designated: September 27, 2000

The Heyworth Building is a Chicago Landmark located at 29 East Madison Street, on the southwest corner of Madison Street and Wabash Avenue in Chicago, Illinois.

The building was constructed in 1904 by the architectural firm of D. H. Burnham & Company under the commission of Otto Young, a real estate investor and wholesale jeweler. It received its name from Lawrence Heyworth, the son-in-law of Otto Young, who also supervised construction of the building. Like many other buildings along Wabash Avenue, the Heyworth historically housed watchmakers, jewelers, and associated businesses. This structure was one of the final buildings designed by Frederick P. Dinkelberg at the firm before administration was turned over to Ernest Robert Graham.

The Heyworth stands 19 stories tall with a gross square footage of 256,000 square feet (23,800 m^{2}). Its style strays from the typical designs of Burnham and Root, appearing more rigid and geometrical than their other works done in a classical style. It combined the Chicago School's structurally expressive character with decorative appearance common in traditional masonry architecture. The tapestry-like ornament of the building pairs well with the ornamentation designed by Louis Sullivan on the adjacent Sullivan Center building. The Heyworth is also noted for its intact finely crafted decorative cornice, which is an uncommon feature among the other commercial buildings of Chicago. The building was designated a Chicago Landmark on September 27, 2000.

According to a real estate firm that manages the property, the height of the building is listed in various documents as 260 or 273 or 282 feet (79 or 83 or 86 m).

The building underwent an $11 million (equivalent to $20 million in 2025) renovation in 2001. As part of the renovation, the façade was cleaned and the famous cornice was rebuilt after having undergone a stripping in years past. It is currently the home of Computer Systems Institute, the ESL Academy's Chicago campus, MacCormac College in Chicago and to the Center for Economic Progress.

== See also ==
- Chicago school (architecture)
- Chicago architecture
