= Joachim Giæver =

American architect

Joachim Gotsche Giæver
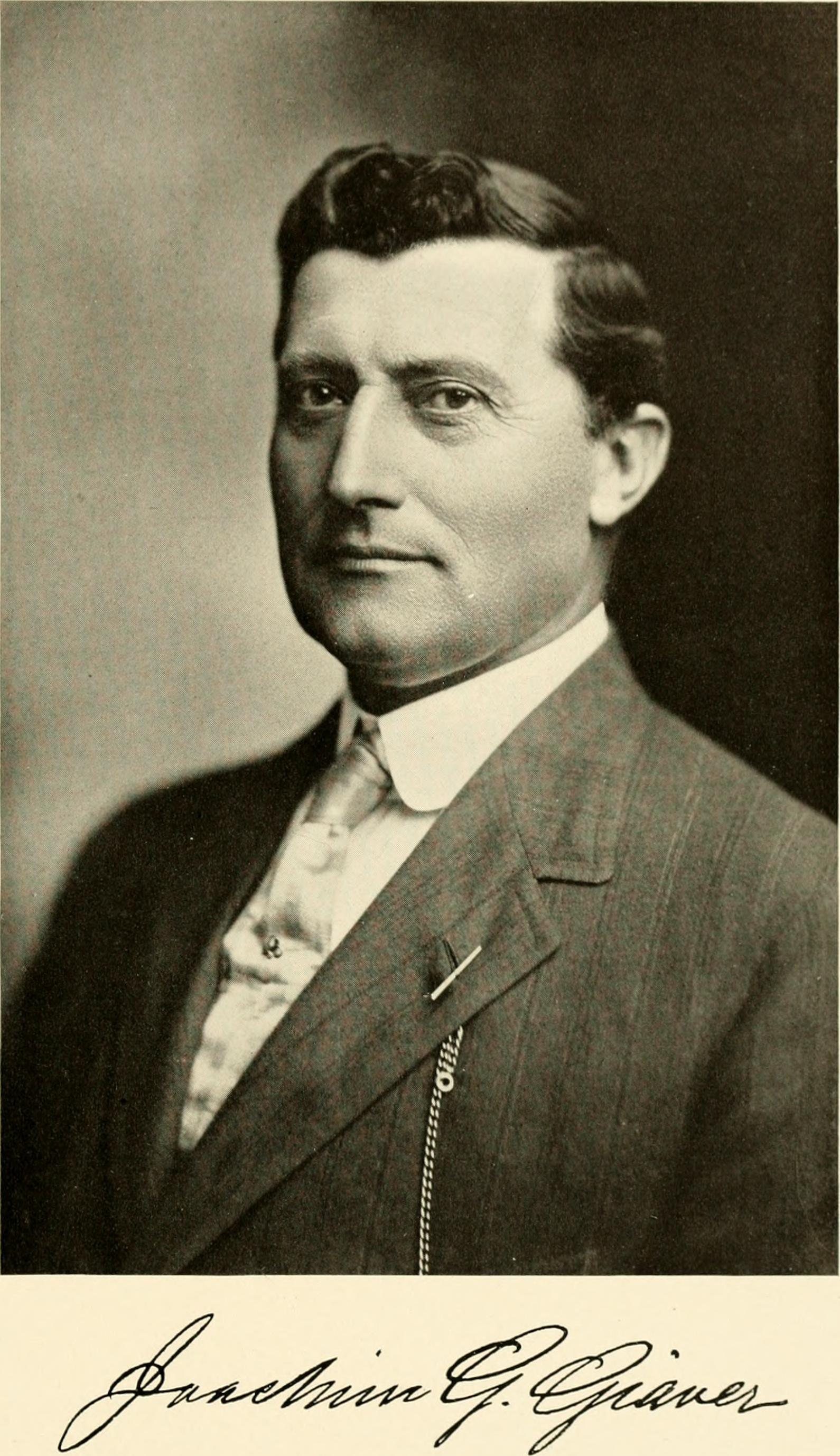
- Born: 15 August 1856; Jøvik i Ullsfjorden, Norway
- Died: 29 May 1925 (aged 68); Chicago, Illinois
- Education: Trondhjems Tekniske Læreanstalt, 1881
- Spouse: Louise Caroline Schmedling (m. 1883)
- Parent(s): Jens Holmboe Giæver and Hanna Birgithe Holmboe
- Engineering career
- Discipline: Civil engineer
- Projects: Constructed the framework of the Statue of Liberty
- Awards: Knight, 1st class of the Order of St. Olav

Joachim Gotsche Giæver (15 August 1856 – 29 May 1925) was a Norwegian born, American civil engineer who designed major structures in the United States.

== Biography ==
Joachim Gotsche Giæver was born at the village of Jøvik at Lyngen Municipality in Troms, Norway. He was the youngest of eight children born to Jens Holmboe Giæver (1813–1884) and Hanna Birgithe Holmboe (1821–1903). His father was a leader in the local fishing industry. Giæver entered the Norwegian Institute of Technology (Trondhjems Tekniske Læreanstalt) at Trondheim from which he was graduated in 1881 with the degree of Civil Engineer.

He migrated to the United States in 1882, where he found employment as a draftsman at Saint Paul and Pacific Railroad in St. Paul, Minnesota. In 1883, he went to Pittsburgh, Pennsylvania, to work as a draftsman and later civil engineer for the Schiffler Bridge & Iron Co. where he designed several bridges over the Allegheny and Monongahela Rivers. He was married in New York during 1883 to Louise C. Schmedling of Trondhjem, Norway.

In 1886, he designed the structural framework for the Statue of Liberty (Liberty Enlightening the World). His work involved design computations, detailed fabrication and construction drawings, as well as oversight of construction. In completing his engineering for the statue’s frame, he worked from drawings and sketches produced by the designer, Gustave Eiffel. In 1891, he went to Chicago to become Assistant Chief Engineer of the World’s Columbian Exposition. In 1898, he became Chief Engineer for the firm of D. H. Burnham & Company, a position he held until 1915.

In 1916, he entered into partnership with Frederick P. Dinkelberg to form the architectural and engineering firm of Giaver and Dinkelberg. Later with the architect firm of Thielbar and Furgard; Giaver and Dinkleberg, he assisted with the design on the 35 East Wacker Building (also known as the Jewellers' Building) located in downtown Chicago. Designed during 1924 with construction finished during 1926, at the time it was America's largest building outside of New York City.

He was a trustee of the Norwegian American Hospital in Chicago, President of the Chicago Norske Klub and a member of the American Society of Civil Engineers. He was decorated as a Knight, 1st class of the Order of St. Olav in 1920.

== Other sources ==
- Bjork, Kenneth O. (1947) Saga in Steel and Concrete - Norwegian Engineers in America (Northfield, Minnesota: Norwegian-American Historical Association)
- Hines, Thomas S. (2008) Burnham of Chicago: Architect and Planner (University of Chicago Press) ISBN 9780226341729
