= Frederick P. Dinkelberg =

American architect (1858–1935)

- Born: June 30, 1858; Lancaster, Pennsylvania
- Died: February 10, 1935 (age 76); Chicago, Illinois
- Education: Pennsylvania Academy of the Fine Arts
- Occupation: Architect
- Buildings: Flatiron Building; 35 East Wacker; Santa Fe Building; Heyworth Building; Wanamaker's; Land Title Building; Fourth & Walnut Center

Frederick Philip Dinkelberg (June 30, 1858 – February 10, 1935) was an American architect best known for being Daniel Burnham's associate for the design of the Flatiron Building in New York City. Other important projects he worked on include, Chicago's Railway Exchange and the Jewelers' Building, and Philadelphia and New York's Wanamaker's Department Stores.

== Life and career ==
Dinkelberg was born on June 30, 1858, in Lancaster, Pennsylvania, to Maria Imer (1832–1872), who was supposedly an Italian Countess, and well-to-do contractor Philip Dinkelberg (1832–1886) who was born at Ramsen in Rheinland-Pfalz. Frederick grew up in privileged surroundings, and studied architecture at the Pennsylvania Academy of the Fine Arts in Philadelphia.

In 1881, he began his career as a practicing architect in New York City, where he would remain for 10 years. While there, he designed a 26-story skyscraper in lower Manhattan, on Broadway between Battery Place and Maiden Street, which has since been demolished. At the time, this was the tallest office building in the world and formed the basis for Dinkelberg's widely published obituaries crediting him as the "Father of the Skyscraper." In 1892, he designed the home of Andrew Simonds Jr. in Charleston, South Carolina at 4 South Battery. In addition, for developer William Broadbelt he designed a row of eleven limestone Renaissance revival-style townhouses at 757–777 Saint Nicholas Avenue in Sugar Hill in Harlem, which are "among the finest" in the Hamilton Heights/Sugar Hill Historic District and Extension. In 1898, Dinkelberg's submitted design for a new building for Erasmus Hall High School in Brooklyn was published in American Architect and Building News. The submission, which was not chosen for construction, was a tall French-inspired H-plan building topped by a mansard roof and cupola.

While in New York, Dinkelberg met Charles Atwood, and, through Atwood, Daniel Burnham, who hired Dinkelberg to work on the World's Columbian Exposition, for which Burnham was the chief of construction. Once the fair was completed, Burnham hired Dinkelberg for his firm, D. H. Burnham & Company. There, he designed the Santa Fe Building, also known as Railway Exchange Building, a 17-story office building built in 1903–1904 and today part of the Historic Michigan Boulevard District, and the Heyworth Building, a 19-story office building which is now a Chicago landmark.

When Burnham was commissioned by Harry S. Black of the Fuller Company to design a new company headquarters on a triangular plot of land on Madison Square in Manhattan, Burnham had numerous other projects he was already working on, and he assigned Dinkelberg to what was then called the "Fuller Building", but which would gain fame as the Flatiron Building. The extent of Dinkelberg's responsibility for the details of the design of the Flatiron Building is not known, and the design was credited at the time to "D.H. Burnham & Co."

During his years with Burnham, Dinkelberg designed the Flatiron Bldg., Wanamaker's Stores in both NYC and Philadelphia; McCreary Store, Pittsburgh; Land Title Bldg., Philadelphia.; First National Bank (now known as Fourth & Walnut Center) and Fourth National Bank (now known as 18 E Fourth Luxury Condos of Cincinnati; Bank of Commerce & Trust Co., Memphis; Hibernian Bank, New Orleans; Field Annex, Railway Exchange, Heyworth Building, Edison Building (originally known as Commercial National Bank Building until 1912), and Conway buildings, Chicago. Dinkelberg served as Daniel Burnham's chief designer for 7 years. In 1898 Dinkelberg also designed and built a model aluminum streamlined train.

Dinkelberg moved to Mill Valley, California (Marin County) in 1912, not returning to Evanston, IL until 1915. He maintained an office at 1005 Chronicle Building, San Francisco and received a California certificate to practice architecture in early 1914. He most likely was there to assist in the design of the Panama–Pacific International Exposition.

Later with Joachim Giæver, Dinkelberg was the co-designer of the 35 East Wacker Building in Chicago, built in 1925–1927 and a designated Chicago landmark since February 9, 1994. Giæver and Dinkelberg were also involved in the design of Grand Park Centre, also known as the Michigan Mutual Building, in Detroit, Michigan in 1922.

Dinkelberg amassed a fortune during his career, which he invested in utility stocks, which lost all value in the Wall Street crash of 1929. He and his wife, Emily Dunn Dinkelberg, sold their house in Evanston, Illinois. When Dinkelberg died in Chicago on February 10, 1935, at the age of 76, the couple was on relief and living in a small apartment. Dinkelberg's funeral was paid for by friends and colleagues at the Chicago branch of the American Institute of Architects. p. 71

Dinkelberg's tombstone in Wunder's Cemetery reports Feb 10, 1934 as date of death, one year in error. Dinkelberg's wife, Emily, destitute and living in an "old peoples' home" died 10 years later July 3, 1945. Her body remained unclaimed for over a week and was about to be donated to a medical school when a Chicago attorney brought the matter to the Tribune. The following day her body was claimed by the A.I.A. and they paid for her burial next to Fred. Her grave is unmarked.
