= Railway Exchange Building (Chicago) =

Office skyscraper in Chicago, Illinois

- U.S. National Register of Historic Places
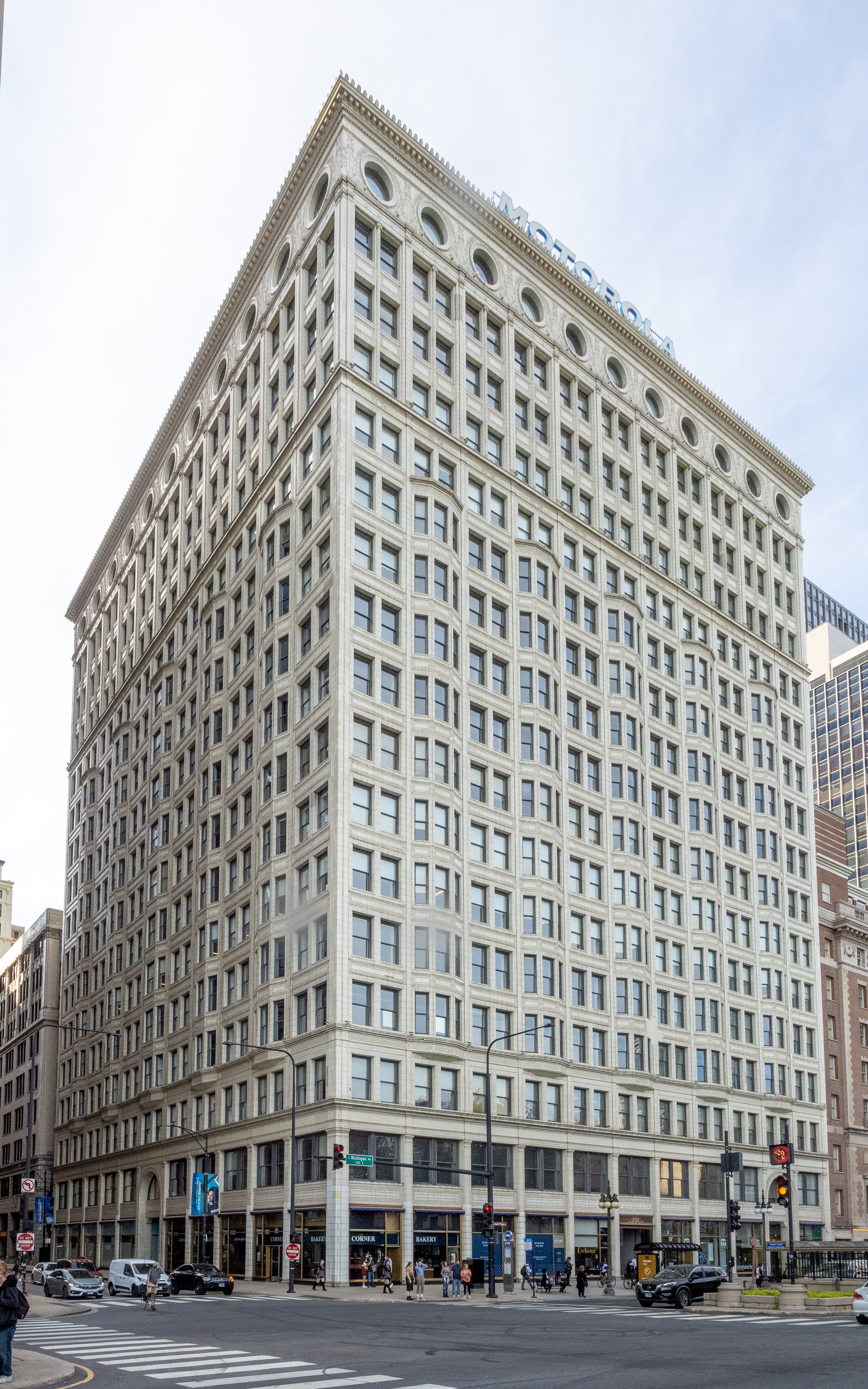
- The Railway Exchange Building in 2021

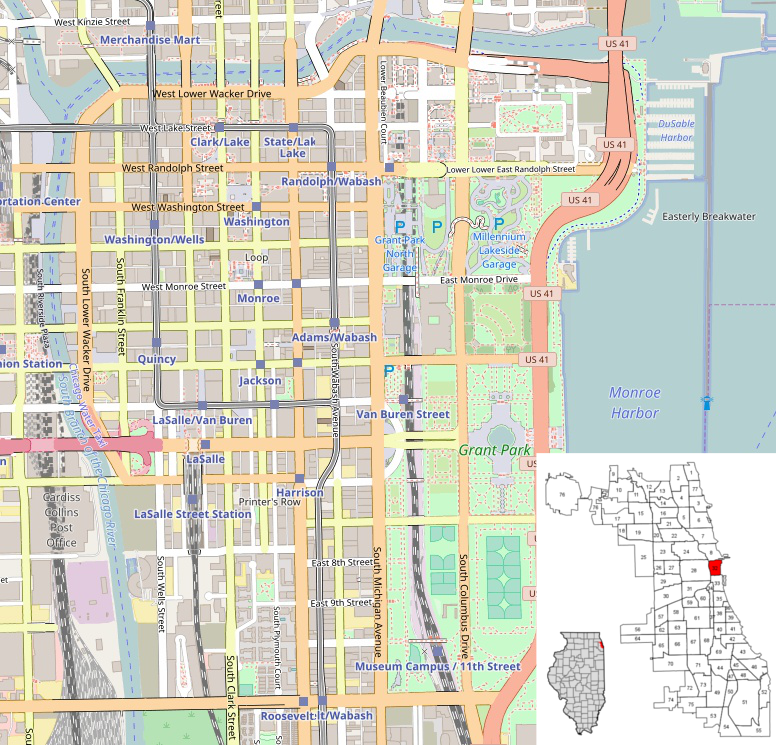
- Location within Chicago Loop
- Location: 224 South Michigan Avenue, Chicago, Illinois, U.S.
- Coordinates: 41°52′42.10″N 87°37′28.58″W
- Built: 1903–1904
- Architect: D. H. Burnham & Company; F. P. Dinkelberg
- Architectural style: Chicago
- NRHP reference No.: 82002530
- Added to NRHP: June 3, 1982

The Railway Exchange Building, also known as Santa Fe Building, is a 17-story office building in the Historic Michigan Boulevard District of the Loop community area of Chicago in Cook County, Illinois, United States. It was designed by Frederick P. Dinkelberg of D. H. Burnham & Company in the Chicago style. Dinkelberg was also the associate designer to Daniel Burnham for the Flatiron Building in New York City.

It opened in 1904 at 224 South Michigan Avenue.

The building is recognizable by the large "Motorola" logo on the roof, which is visible from Grant Park across Michigan Ave and from Lake Michigan. It is also notable for the round, porthole-like windows along the cornice. The center of the building features a lightwell, which was covered with a skylight in the 1980s.

== Architecture ==
The formal entrance to the building is located on Jackson Boulevard, which in 1904 was a more important street than Michigan Avenue. The impressive entrance is believed to have been required by Daniel Burnham, head of the architectural firm and the building's main stockholder. The firm moved its offices to the fourteenth floor, and Burnham's descendants continued ownership in the building until 1952. This Chicago School of Architecture building with Beaux Arts detailing is organized as a classicization of John Wellborn Root's Rookery. A street-level, two-story enclosed court designed in a symmetrical Beaux-Arts style was surmounted by an open lightwell which was surrounded by a ring of offices. By the formal arched entrance on Jackson Boulevard, a large staircase led to shops and a second-floor balcony. White-glazed terracotta sheaths the exterior façade and interior court and the lightwell is lined with white-glazed brick. Classical designs were used for the ornamental dentils, balusters, and column capitals. The building is completely steel-framed. In July 2012, the Santa Fe sign was replaced with an illuminated Motorola sign when Motorola Solutions began a lease on one floor of the building. The Santa Fe letters were given to the Illinois Railway Museum. After a four-year restoration, the sign was put on display at the museum in 2016.

The building is significant as a historic site because Daniel Burnham and his staff made the 1909 Plan of Chicago in a penthouse on the northeast corner of the roof.

== Tenants ==
The building was originally built as a railway exchange for the Santa Fe railway. Burnham & Company had offices on the 14th floor. Though the firm's successor, Graham, Anderson, Probst & White, has moved, a number of architectural organizations still practice there, including the Goettsch Partners, VOA Associates, Harding Partners, and the Chicago offices of Skidmore, Owings & Merrill and landscape architecture and planning firm, Design Workshop.

The building was purchased by the University of Notre Dame in 2006. The university's Mendoza College of Business began holding classes there in 2008.

From 2009 to 2018, visitors enjoyed the 320-square-foot Chicago Architecture Foundation scale model of central Chicago in the building's atrium. [An expanded model — with accompanying light show and interpretation — is now at 111 East Wacker Drive, where the CAF moved in 2018; CAF simultaneously changed its name to the Chicago Architecture Center or CAC. CAC continues to update the expanded city model to reflect architectural changes in the downtown area.]

In 2011, Anacostia Rail Holdings moved its corporate headquarters to the Railway Exchange Building.

== Position in Chicago's skyline ==
The Railway Exchange Building appears (unlabelled) in front of Three First National Plaza in the image below:

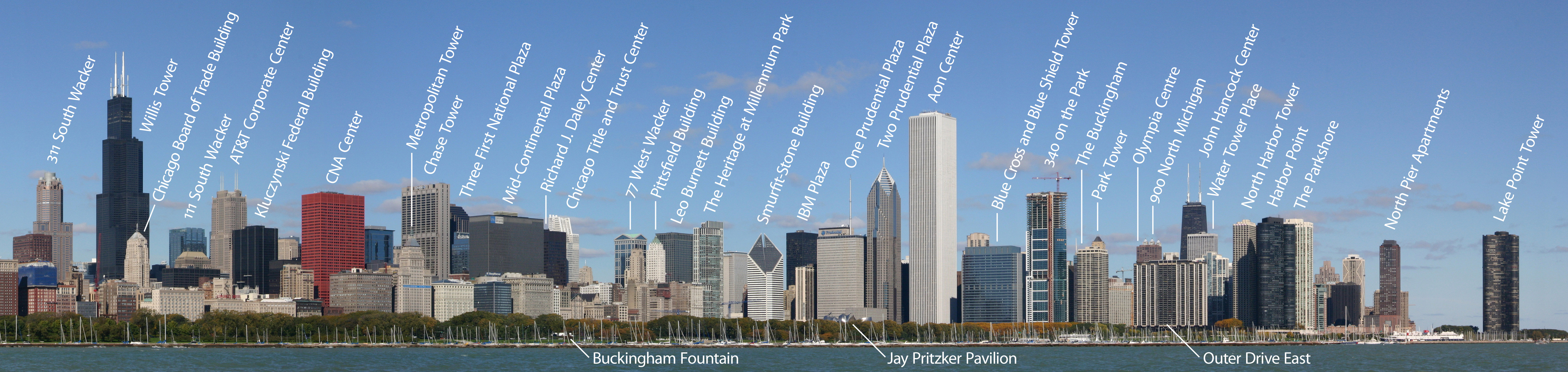

== See also ==
- Early skyscrapers
