= Otto Young =

German-American merchant and real estate mogul

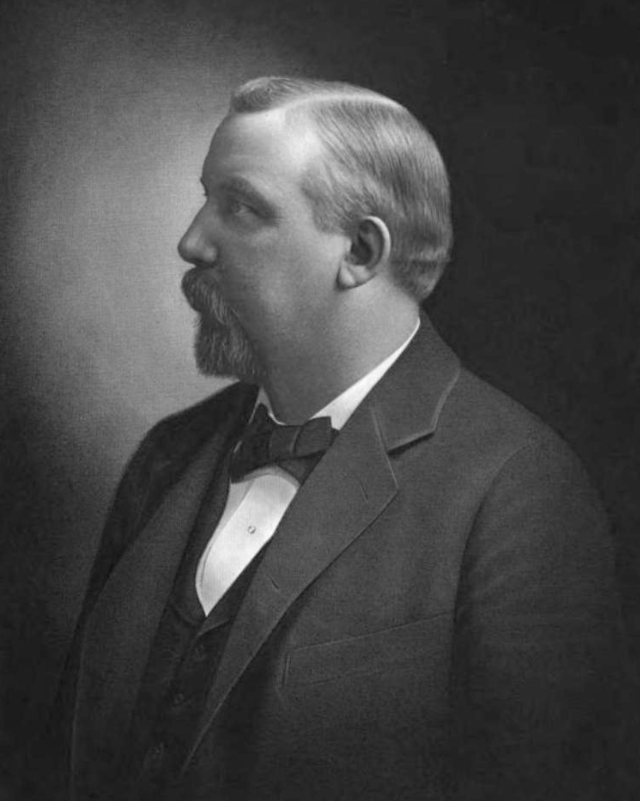
- Born: December 20, 1844; Elberfeld, Prussia
- Died: November 30, 1906 (aged 61); Lake Geneva, Wisconsin, U.S.
- Resting place: Oak Woods Cemetery
- Occupations: Merchant, real estate investor
- Spouse: Ann Elizabeth Murphy
- Children: 5

Otto Young (December 20, 1844 – November 30, 1906) was a German-American merchant and real estate mogul from Elberfeld, Prussia. After his father died in his youth, Young struggled to earn enough money to follow his mother to the United States. After he did, he sold toys on the streets of New York City before attending some school. He then worked as a clerk in a cigar store, eventually amassing enough money to open a jewelry store. The store was very successful and Young moved west to establish a new store in Chicago, Illinois.

With the earnings from his Chicago store, Young purchased a half interest in The Fair Store. The value of the store skyrocketed afterward and Young became wealthy. He maintained several interests in real estate, including the Heyworth Building, and served on the board of trustees of the First National Bank of Chicago. Young was also a philanthropist, and often donated to the Chicago Home for Incurables in memory of his son. Young's estate in Lake Geneva, Wisconsin is today recognized on the National Register of Historic Places.

== Early life ==
Otto Young was born on December 20, 1844, in Elberfeld, Prussia. His father and grandfather were architects, and Young initially studied the same trade. He also attended school at the local Roman Catholic Church. When Young was ten, his father died. His mother immigrated to the United States three or four years later, leaving Young in Düsseldorf. Although Young was instructed to follow her when he had the means, he instead moved to London, England, living on Threadneedle Street. However, he soon ran out of money and struggled to find enough food to eat.

While working a temporary job on a dock, Young decided to follow his mother to the United States. He boarded the SS Great Eastern, arriving in New York City. There, he noticed a particularly successful toy store on Broadway. He purchased a supply of toys from a wholesaler and peddled them on the street. After a week, he had saved up enough money to return to his mother. She encouraged him to attend a school, where he studied for eight months. Young then ran away and took a job as a clerk of a cigar store in New York City.

== Career ==
In the early 1860s, Young used his savings from the cigar store to found a jewelry house. The store was very successful and he sold it in 1867 to establish a new store, intending to open it elsewhere in New York. In the meantime, however, he did some work for another New York trading house. This work took him to Chicago, Illinois in 1871 during the Great Chicago Fire. Young saw potential in the regrowth of the city and established a wholesale jewelry house the next year as Otto Young & Co.

In 1886, Young purchased a half interest in The Fair Store, a department store founded by Ernst J. Lehman, upon its incorporation. The store's value quintupled from $200,000 to $1 million by 1890. By 1901, the company employed over 3,000 people. Young was also on the board of directors of the First National Bank of Chicago and the Chicago City Railway.

Young was also active in Chicago real estate. His largest holding was the Heyworth Building, designed by D. H. Burnham & Company. He also held portions of land under the Carson, Pirie, Scott and Company Building and the Auditorium Building. In declining health, Young sold his portion of The Fair in 1903. He intended to build a large hotel near the Auditorium Building.

== Personal life ==
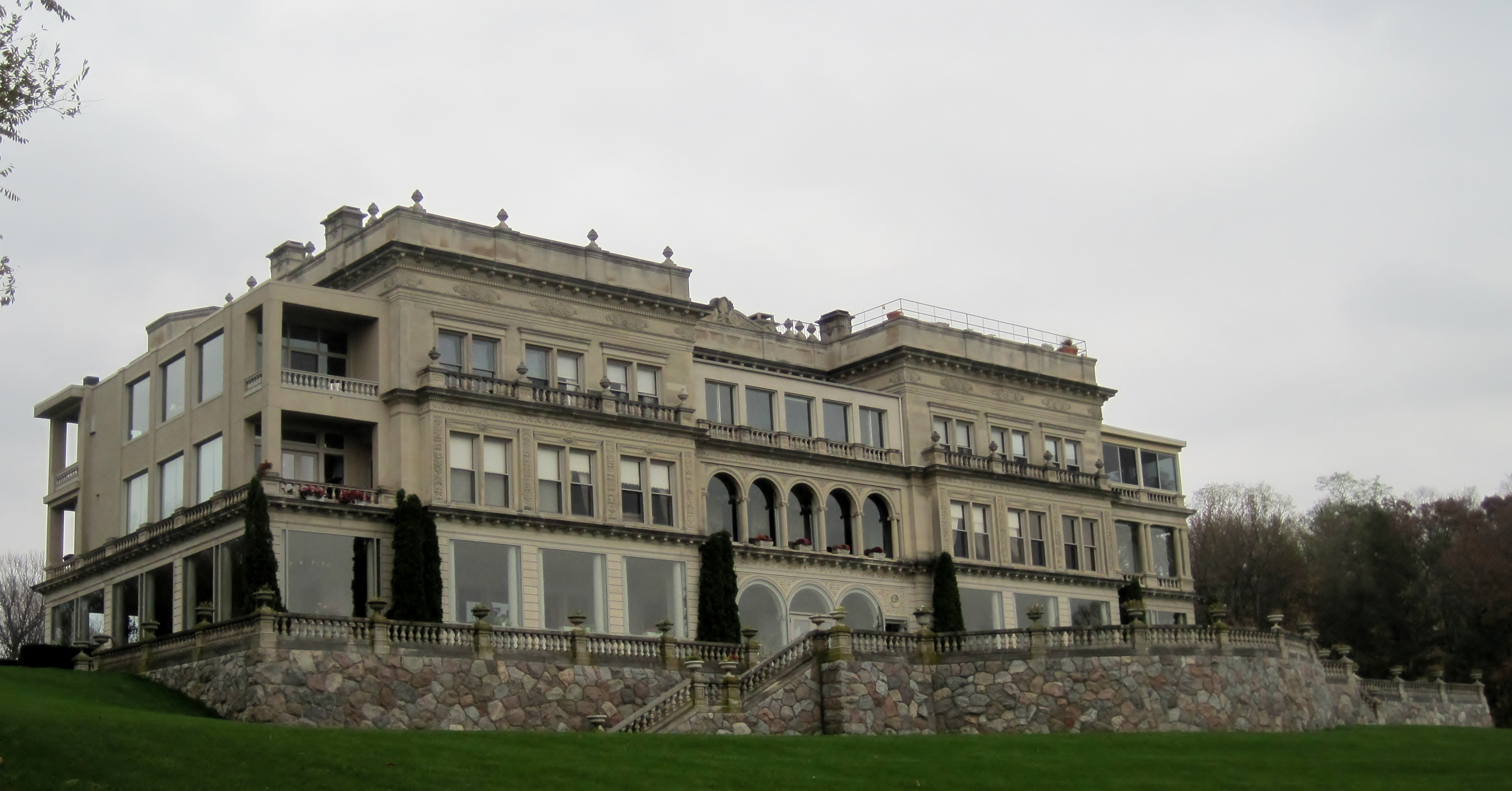
Younglands, the Otto Young estate in Lake Geneva, Wisconsin

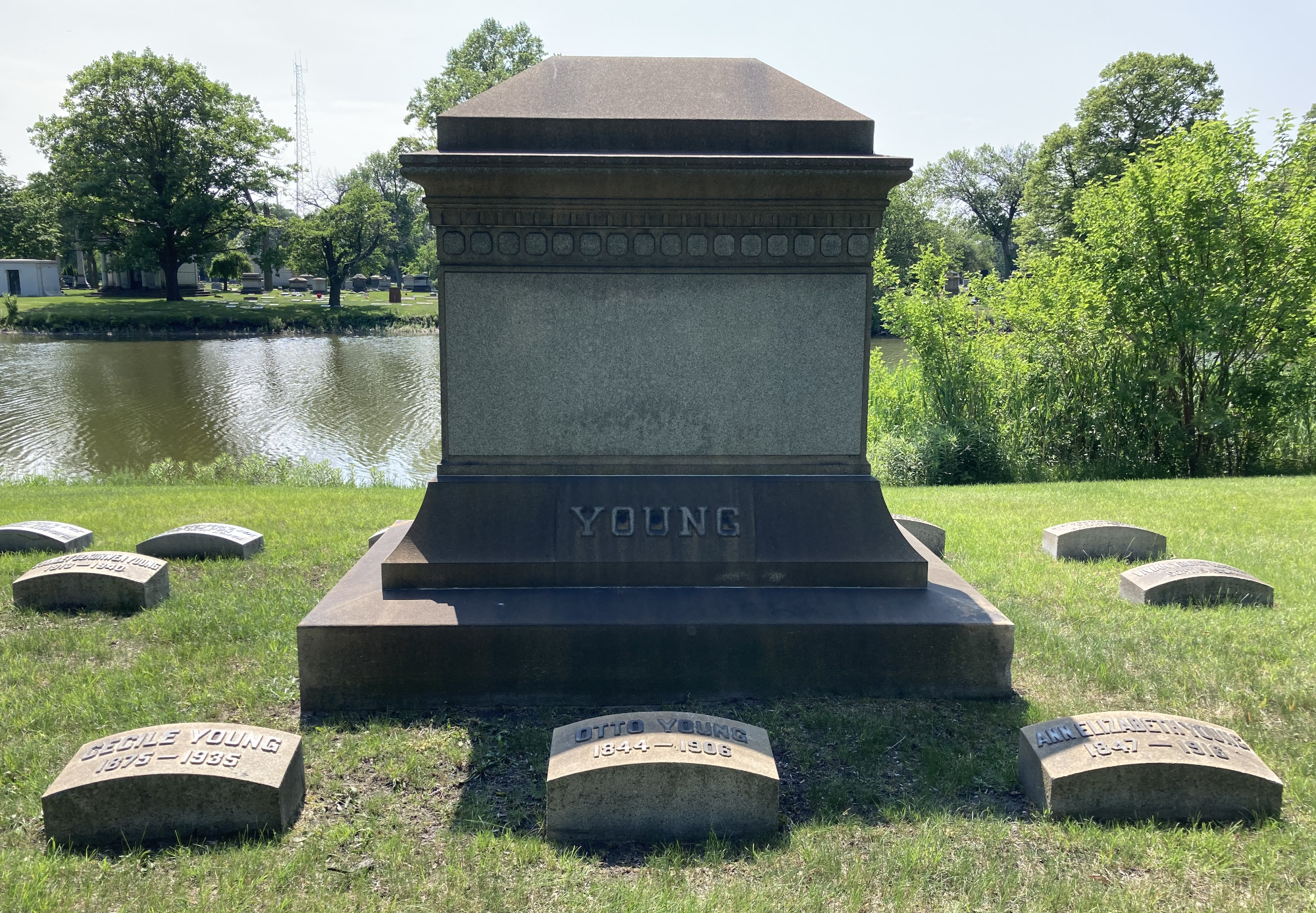
Young's grave at Oak Woods Cemetery

In 1867, Young married Ann Elizabeth Murphy. In 1901, his Renaissance Revival mansion, known as Younglands, was completed in Lake Geneva, Wisconsin. They had four daughters and a son that died young, including:

- John William Young (1872–1896), who died unmarried.
- Cecile Selma Young (1875–1935), who married Lawrence Heyworth and Josip Korwin.
- Marie Julia Young (b. 1878), who married Louis Graveraet Kaufman.
- Catherine Osborn Young (1880–1942), who married Byron Frank Hobart and Walter Forman Wickes.
- Laura Elizabeth Young (1881–1924), who married Samuel Klump Martin Jr.

He was a member of the Union League Club of Chicago. He enjoyed collecting rugs, and his Persian collection in Lake Geneva was thought to be worth over $150,000. Young died on November 30, 1906, at his Lake Geneva estate and was buried in Chicago's Oak Woods Cemetery. He was thought to be worth about $20 million at the time of his death; $460,000 was donated to charity in his will, mainly to the Home for Incurables.

=== Legacy ===
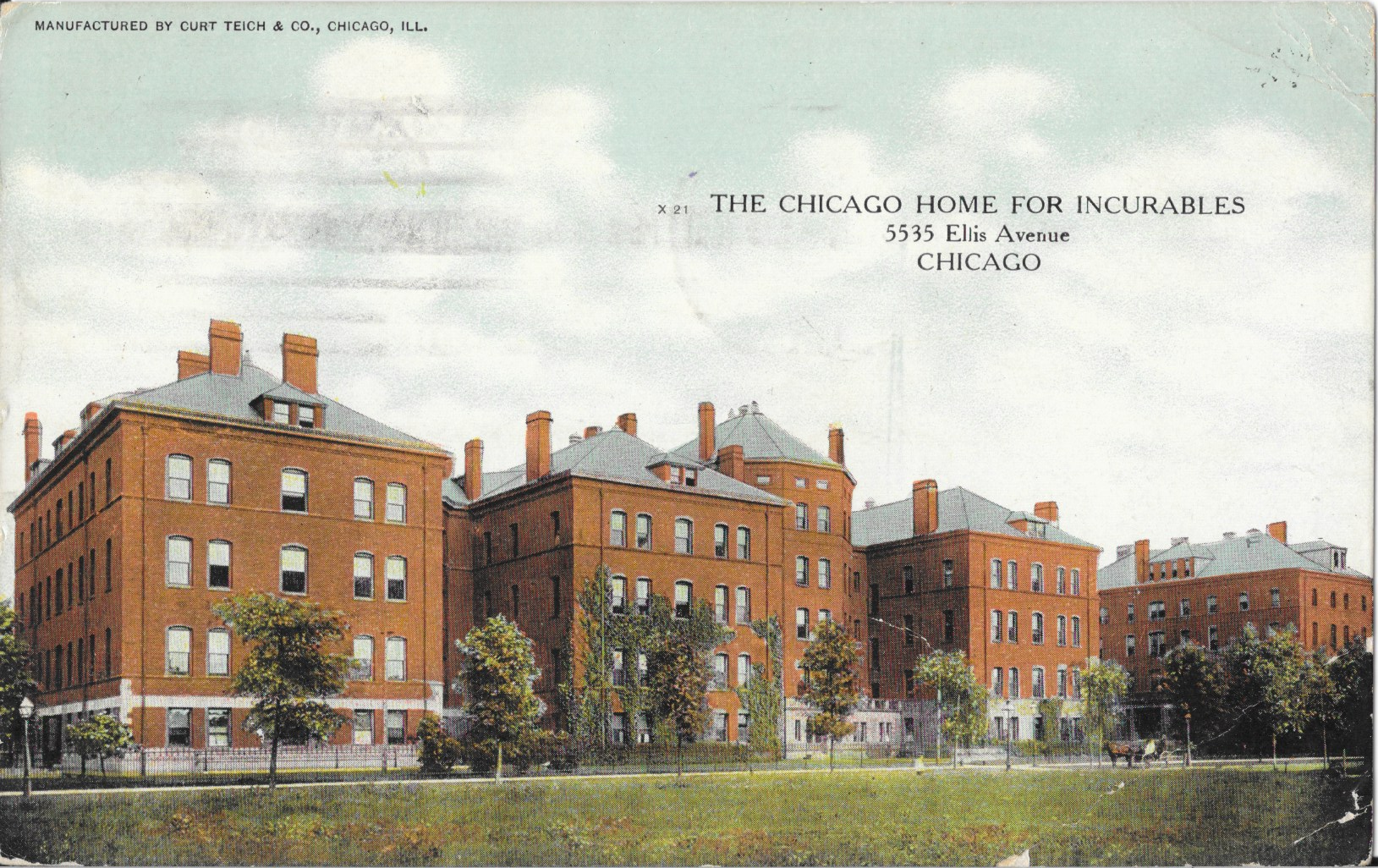
Chicago Home For Incurables circa 1909

In his son's memory, Young funded an addition to the Chicago Home for Incurables.

In 1979, Younglands was listed on the National Register of Historic Places.
