= Generations College =

Private two-year college in Chicago, Illinois

Coordinates: 41.8818°N 87.6267°W

- Former name: MacCormac College
- Motto: Living the Legacy
- Type: Private two-year college
- Established: 1904
- Founder: Morton MacCormac
- Accreditation: Higher Learning Commission
- Chancellor: Grace Alexis
- Location: Chicago, Illinois, United States
- Campus: Urban
- Website: generations.edu

Generations College is a private two-year college in Chicago, Illinois. The college is accredited by the Higher Learning Commission and approved by the National Court Reporters Association and American Bar Association. It is located in downtown Chicago at 29 East Madison Street, on the second floor of the historic Heyworth Building.

== History ==
Generations College was founded in 1904 by Morton C. MacCormac and his wife, Mary MacCormac, in Hyde Park on Chicago's south side near the University of Chicago. MacCormac served as the school's first president for 50 years. The school established the first court reporting program in the United States in 1912 and the first paralegal studies program in Illinois in 1973.

== Accreditation ==
Generations College is accredited by the Higher Learning Commission.
