= 333 North Michigan =

Skyscraper in Chicago, Illinois

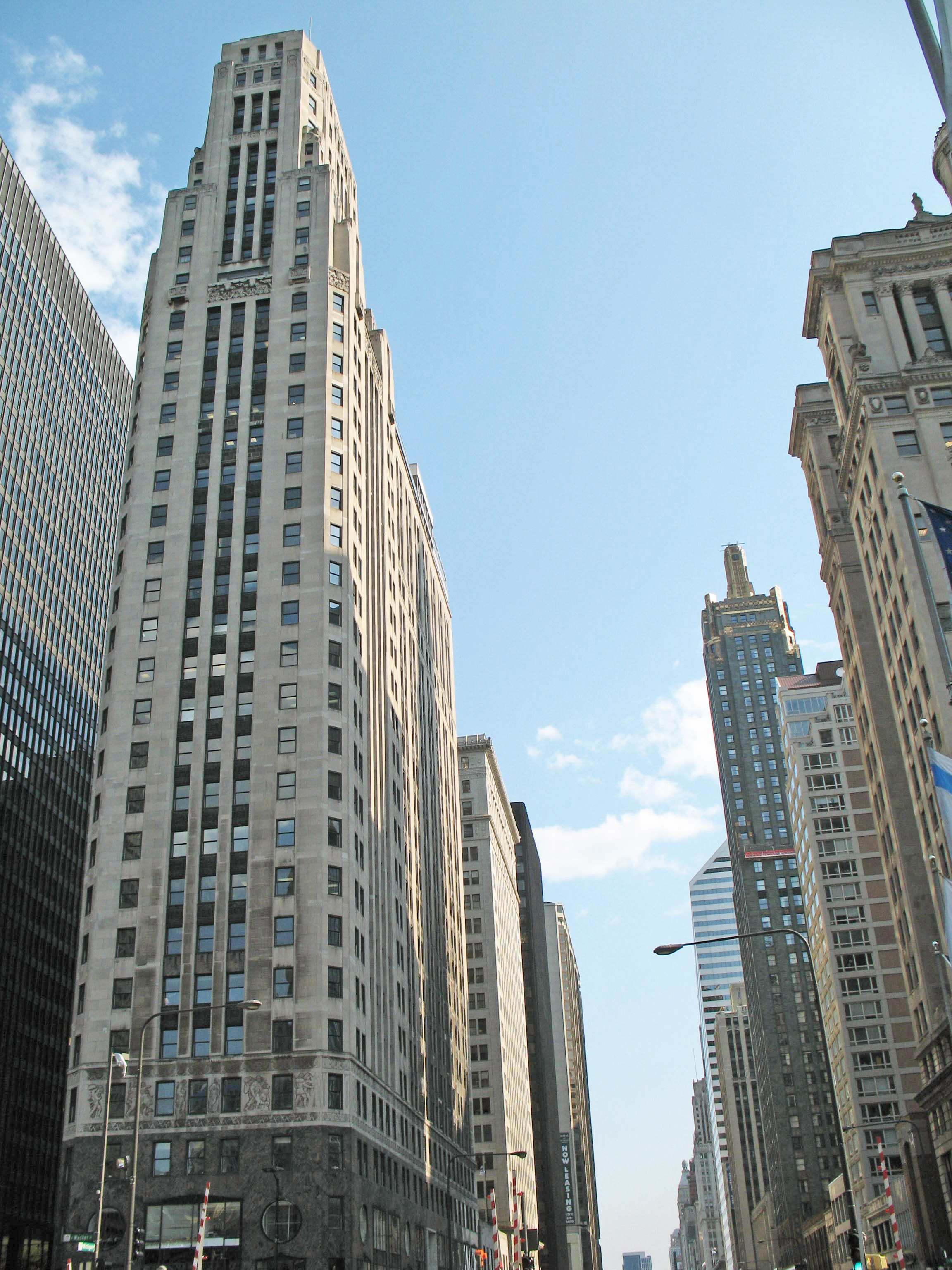
- Interactive map of the 333 North Michigan area

General information
- Status: Completed
- Type: Skyscraper
- Architectural style: Art Deco
- Location: 333 N. Michigan Avenue, Chicago, Illinois, United States
- Coordinates: 41.8880°N 87.6242°W
- Construction started: 1927
- Completed: 1928

Height
- Roof: 396 feet (121 m)

Technical details
- Floor count: 34

Design and construction
- Architect: Holabird & Roche/Holabird & Root

Chicago Landmark
- Designated: February 7, 1997

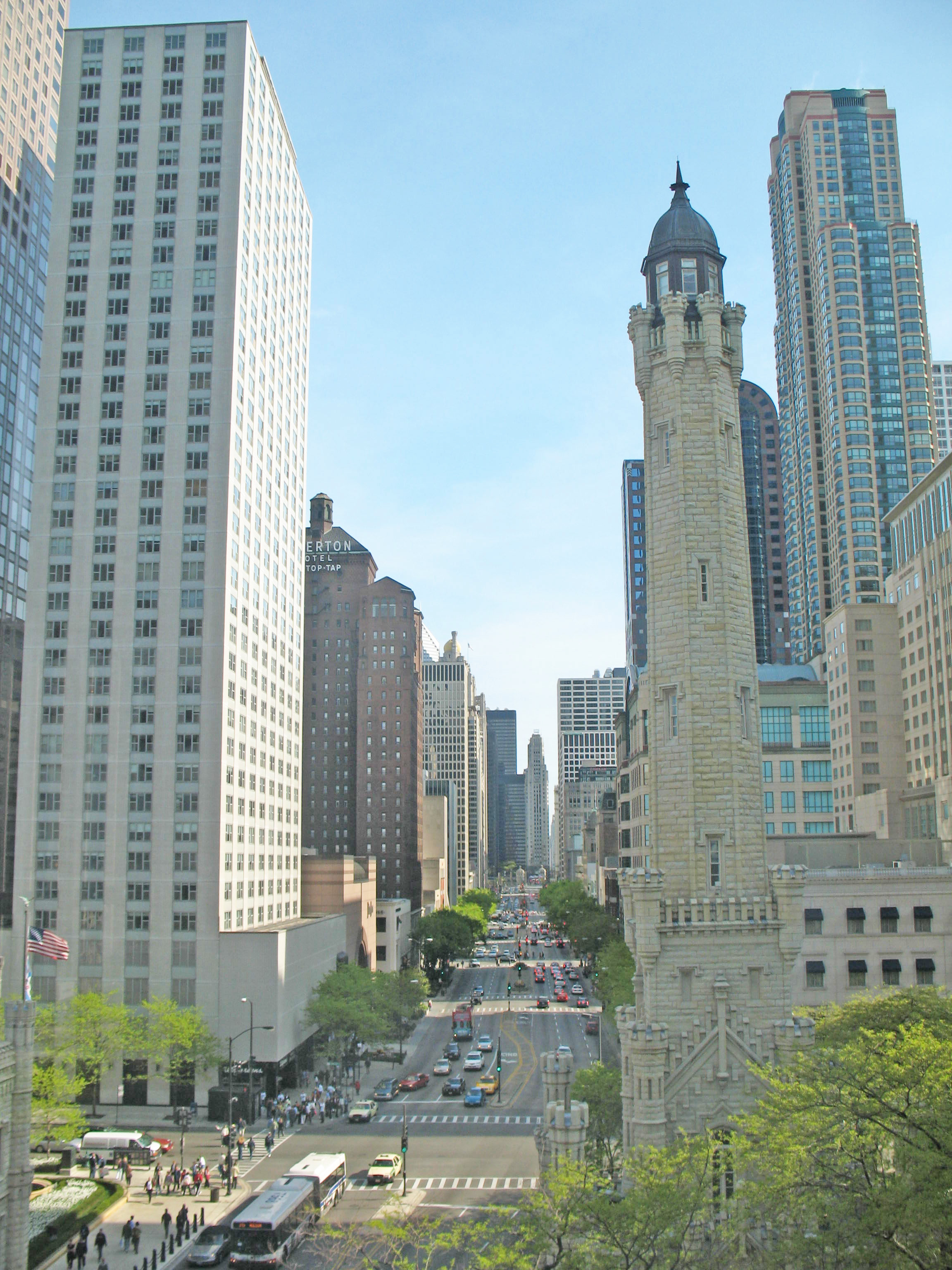
Magnificent Mile looking south
(Red dot marks 333 North Michigan)

333 North Michigan is a skyscraper in the art deco style located in the Loop community area of Chicago, Illinois, United States. Architecturally, it is noted for its dramatic upper-level setbacks that were inspired by the 1923 skyscraper zoning laws. Geographically, it is known as one of the four 1920s flanks of the Michigan Avenue Bridge (along with the Wrigley Building, Tribune Tower and the London Guarantee Building) that are contributing properties to the Michigan–Wacker Historic District, which is a U.S. Registered Historic District.

Additionally, it is known as the geographic beneficiary of the jog in Michigan Avenue, which makes it visible along the Magnificent Mile as the building that seems to be in the middle of the road at the foot of this stretch of road (pictured at left). The building was designed by Holabird & Roche/Holabird & Root and completed in 1928. It is 396 feet (120.7 m) tall, and has 34 stories.

It was designated a Chicago Landmark on February 7, 1997. It is located on the short quarter mile stretch of Michigan Avenue between the Chicago Landmark Historic Michigan Boulevard District and the Magnificent Mile. The building is managed and leased by MB Real Estate.

Designed by John Wellborn Root Jr., the building's long and narrow footprint and towering structure are a tribute to Root's father John Wellborn Root's earlier Chicago Monadnock Building; Louis Sullivan's tall-building canon; and Eliel Saarinen's second-prize entry in the Tribune Tower design contest. The building was such a success that Holabird and Root took commercial residence there. The building's long and slender design optimized use of natural lighting. The building's interior represents Prohibition era modernism, especially its Art Deco Tavern club.

The building is embellished by a polished marble base, ornamental bands, and reliefs depicting frontiersmen and Native Americans at Fort Dearborn, which partially occupied the site.

== Gallery ==
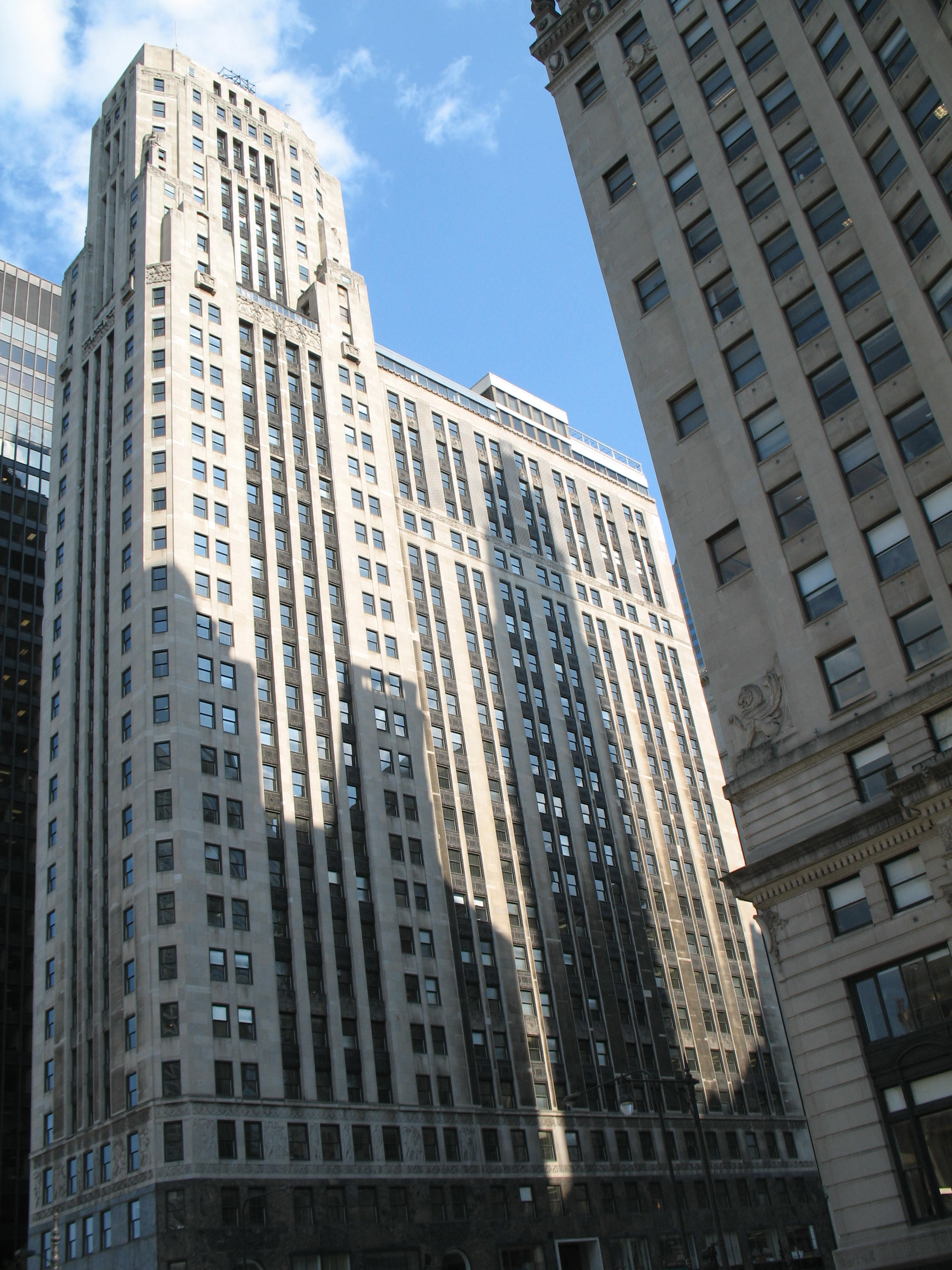
333 North Michigan

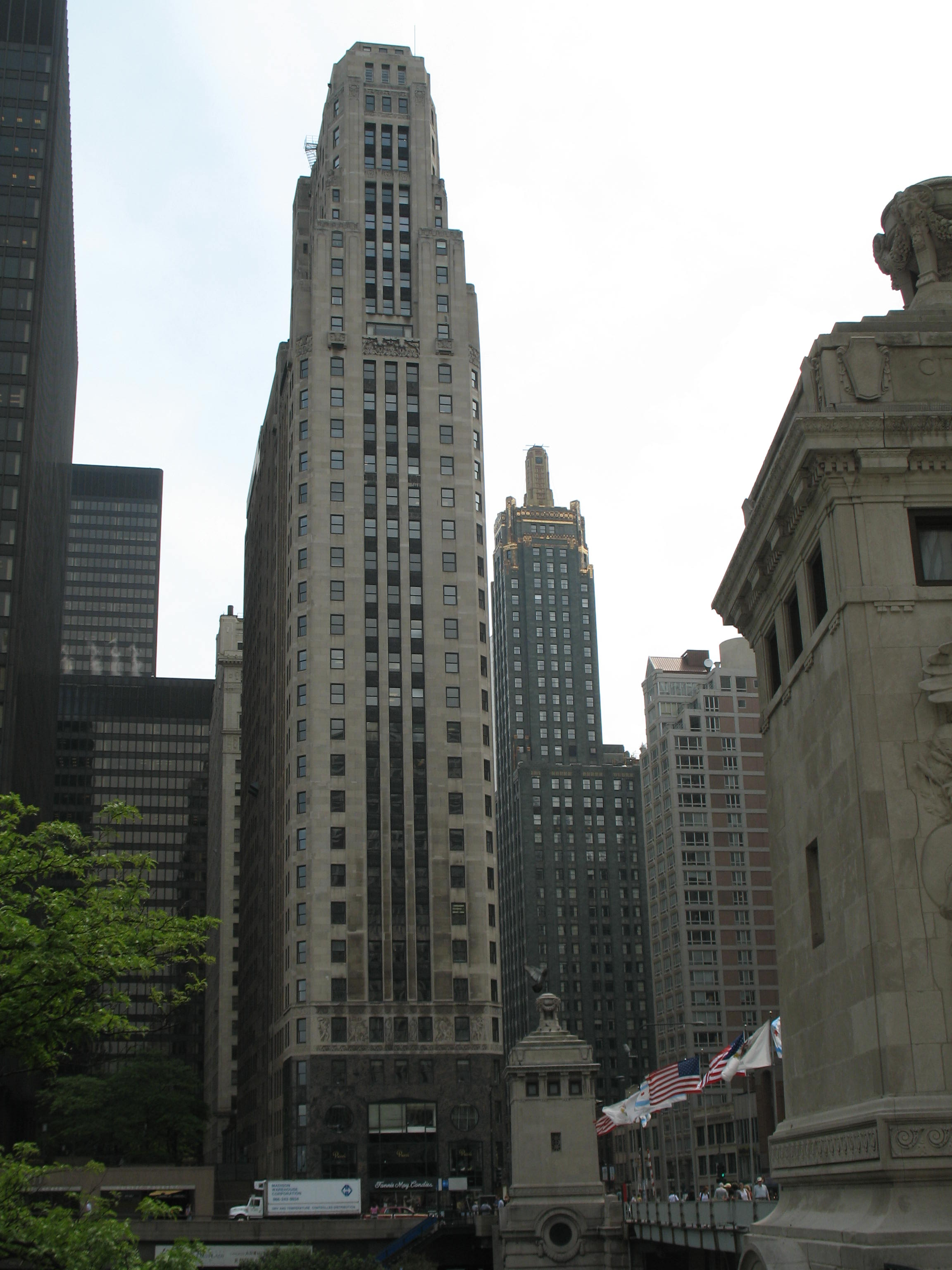
Carbide & Carbon Building behind 333 North Michigan

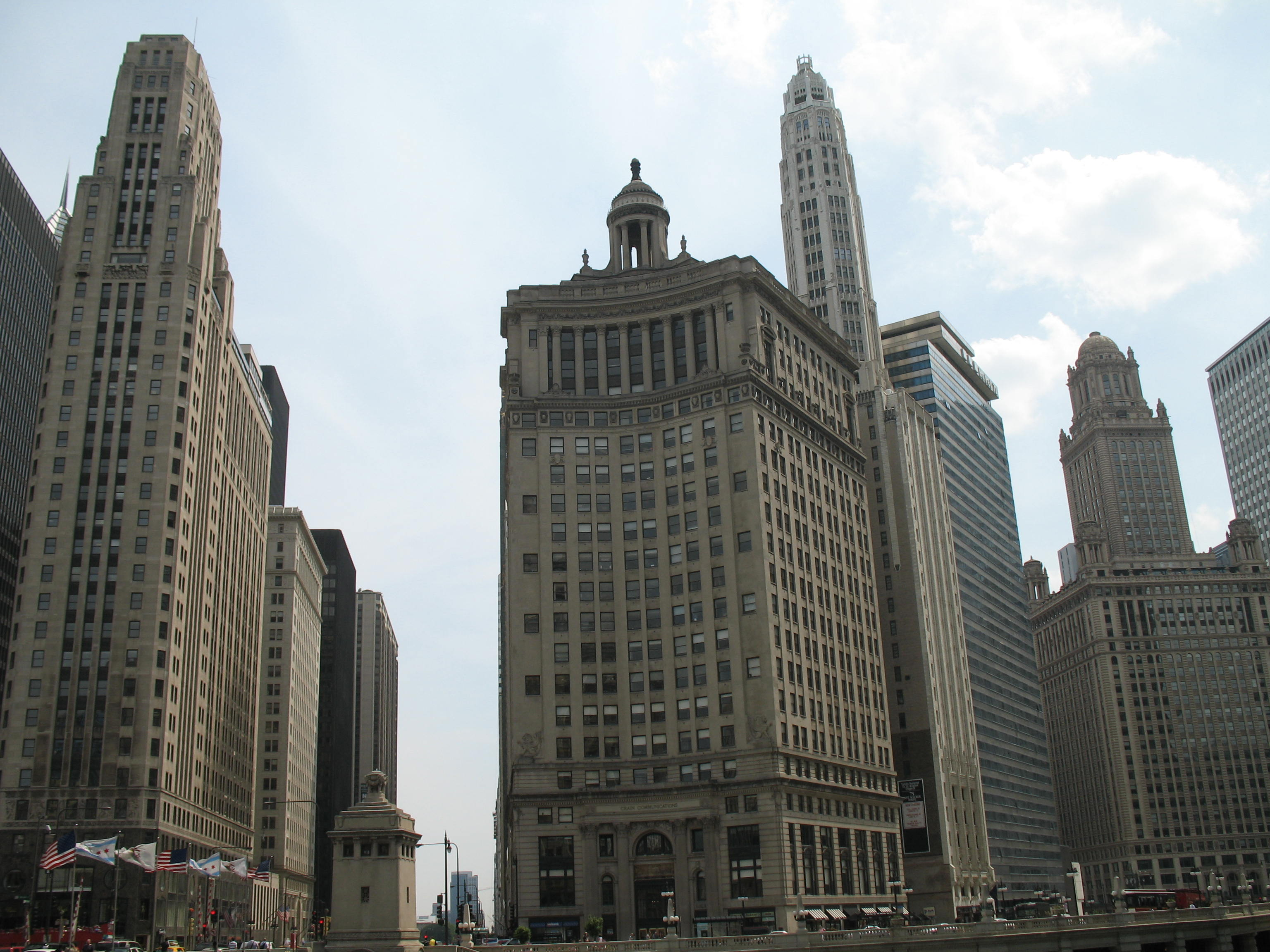
333 North Michigan, 360 North Michigan, Mather Tower and 35 East Wacker

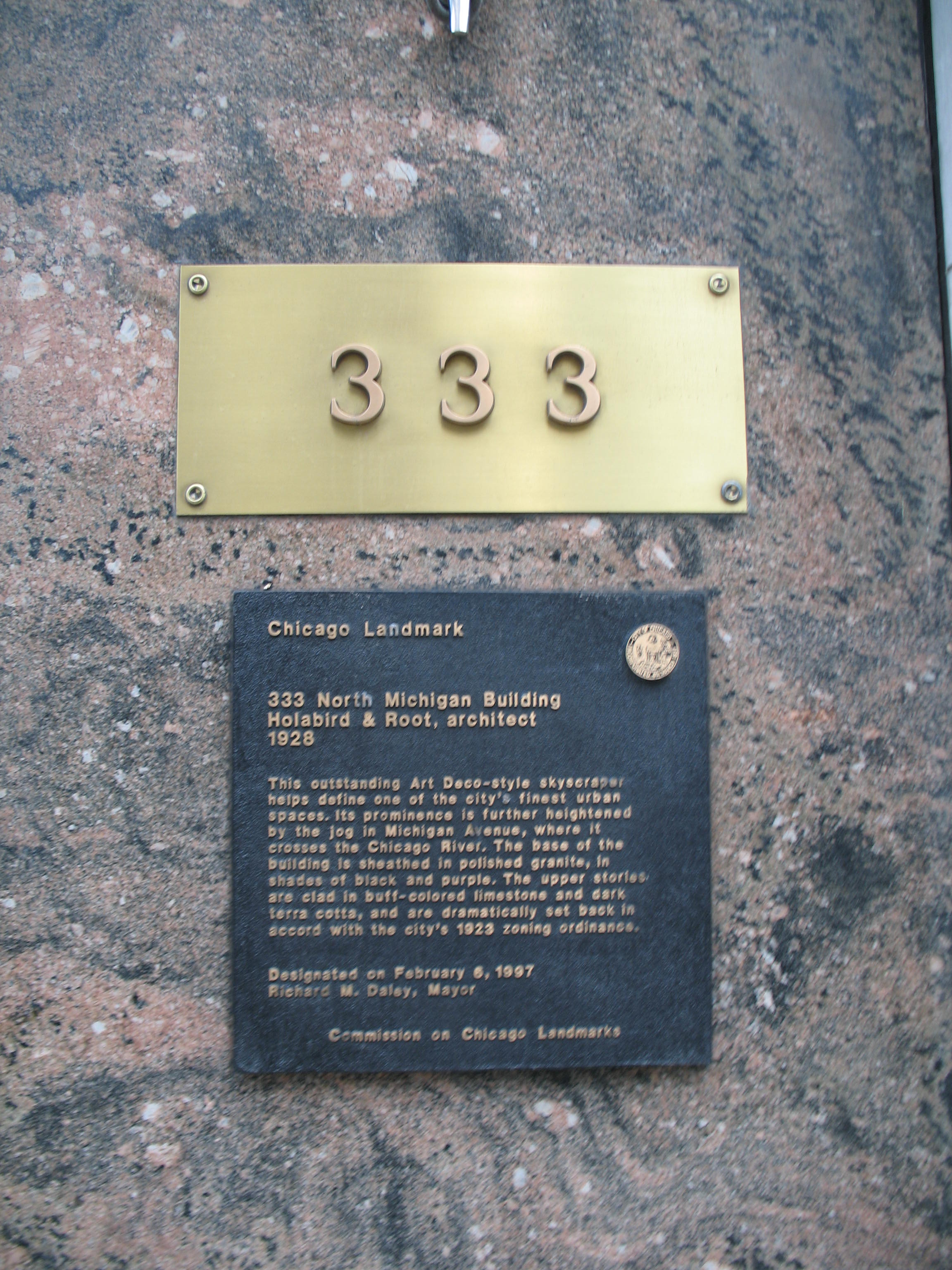
333 North Michigan Chicago Landmark plaque

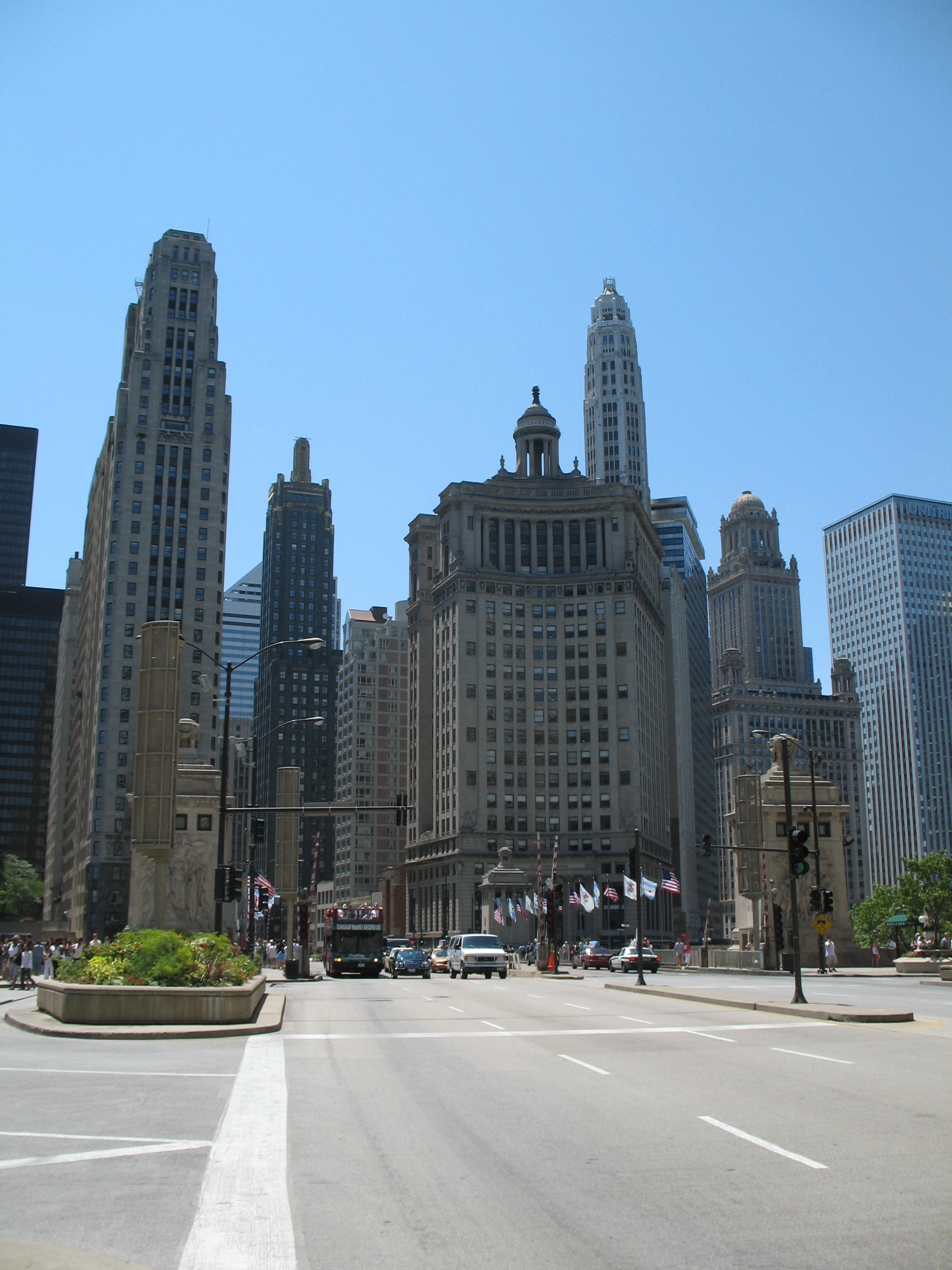
Michigan Avenue Bridge traffic (Background includes 333 North Michigan, Carbide & Carbon Building, London Guarantee Building, Mather Tower and 35 East Wacker)

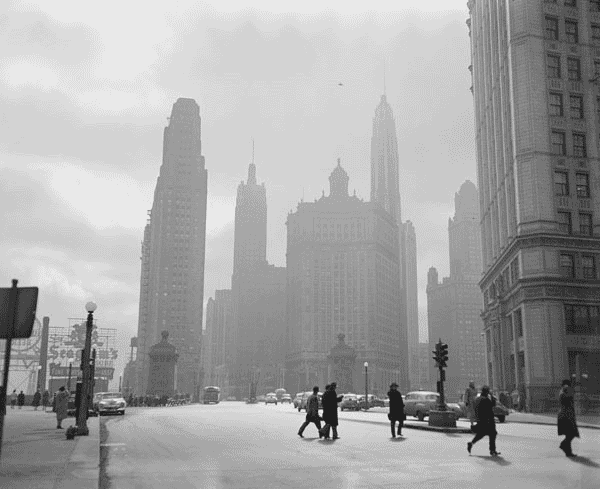
c. 1951

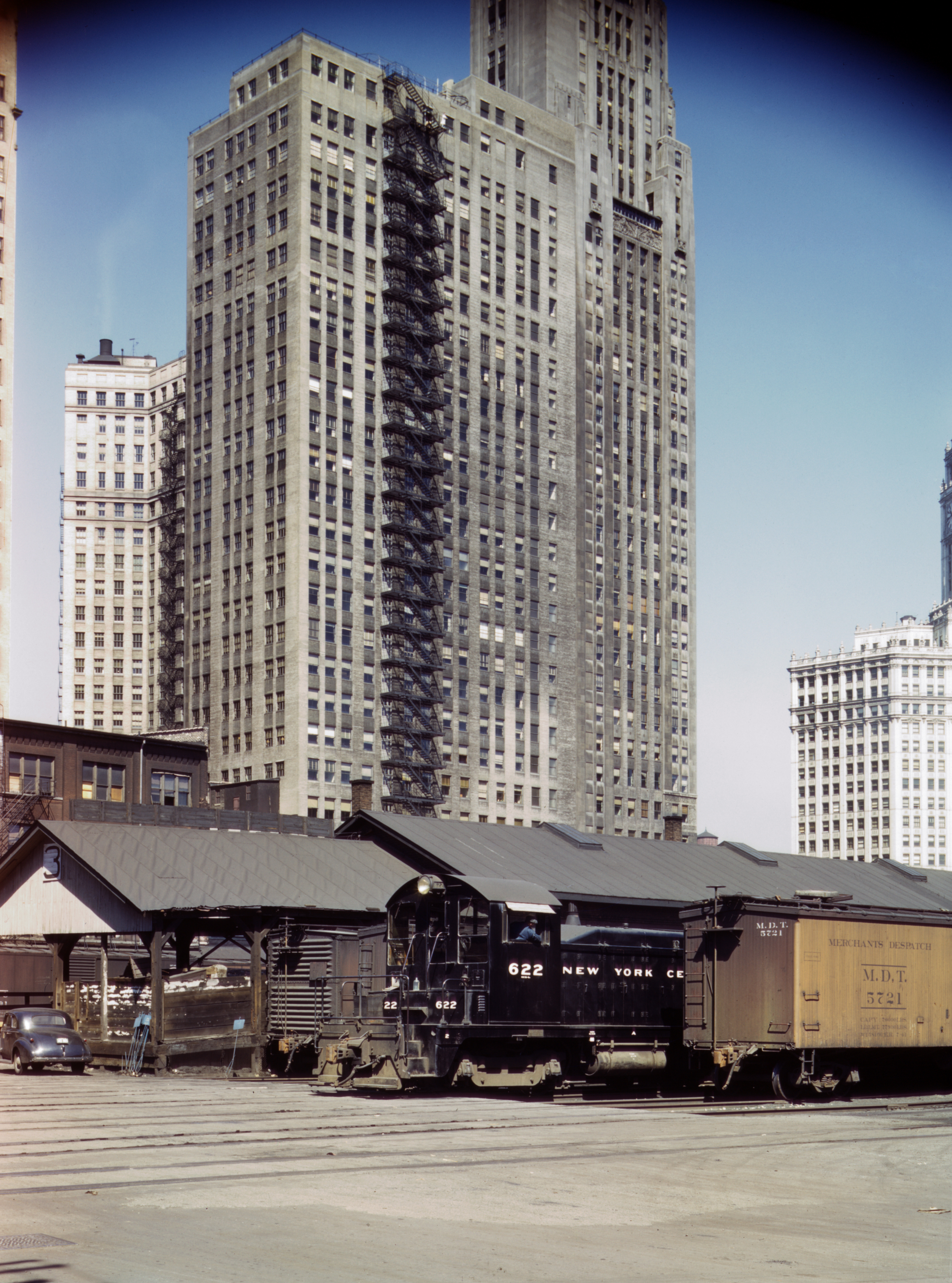
From Illinois Central Railroad freight yard, the current Lakeshore East (April 1943)
