= Three First National Plaza =

Office skyscraper in Chicago, Illinois

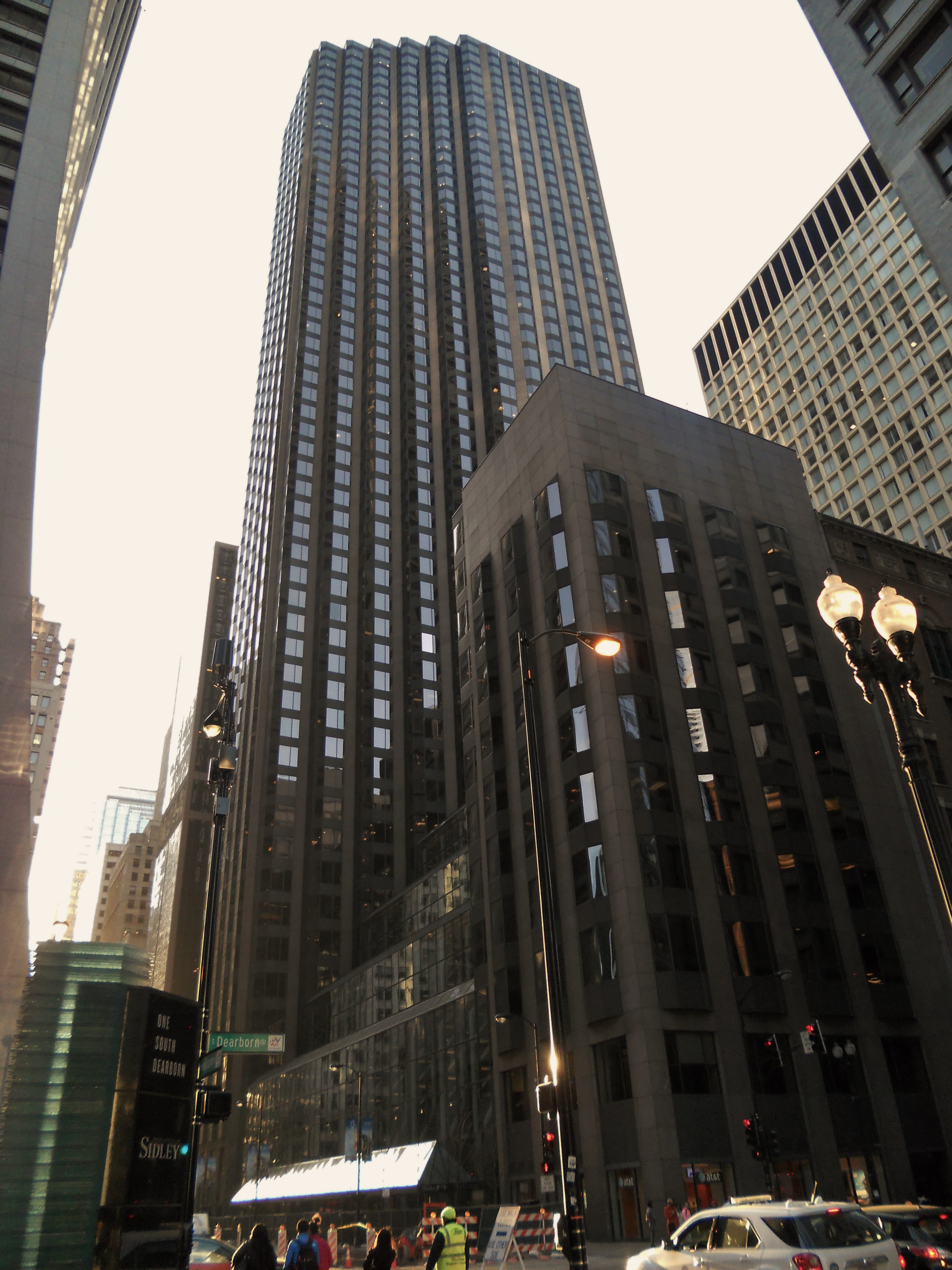

- Location within Chicago metropolitan area Three First National Plaza (Illinois) Three First National Plaza (the United States)

General information
- Location: Chicago, Cook County, Illinois
- Coordinates: 41.8824°N 87.6305°W
- Completed: 1981
- Opening: 1981

Height
- Roof: 767 ft (234 m)

Technical details
- Floor count: 57
- Floor area: 1,439,369 sq ft (133,721.8 m^{2})

Design and construction
- Architect: Skidmore, Owings & Merrill

Three First National Plaza is a 57-story office tower in Chicago located at 70 West Madison Street. Completed in 1981, the building is one of the tallest in Chicago at 767 feet (234 m). The 1,439,369-square-foot (133,721.8 m^{2}) building was designed by Skidmore, Owings & Merrill in a sawtooth shape to minimize obstructions it might cause to nearby buildings. The design also allows for thirteen corner offices on lower floors and nine corner offices in the upper regions. The exterior façade is clad in Carnelian granite and features 10-foot-wide bay windows (3.0 m) suggestive of traditional Chicago school architecture.

Large Internal-External Upright Form by Henry Moore

Three First National Plaza's nine-story atrium used to contain "Large Internal-External Upright Form", a sculpture by Henry Moore. The sculpture was removed and sold in 2016 following a remodel of the lobby. The building features pedway access, and was once connected to Chase Tower by a second-story skywalk.

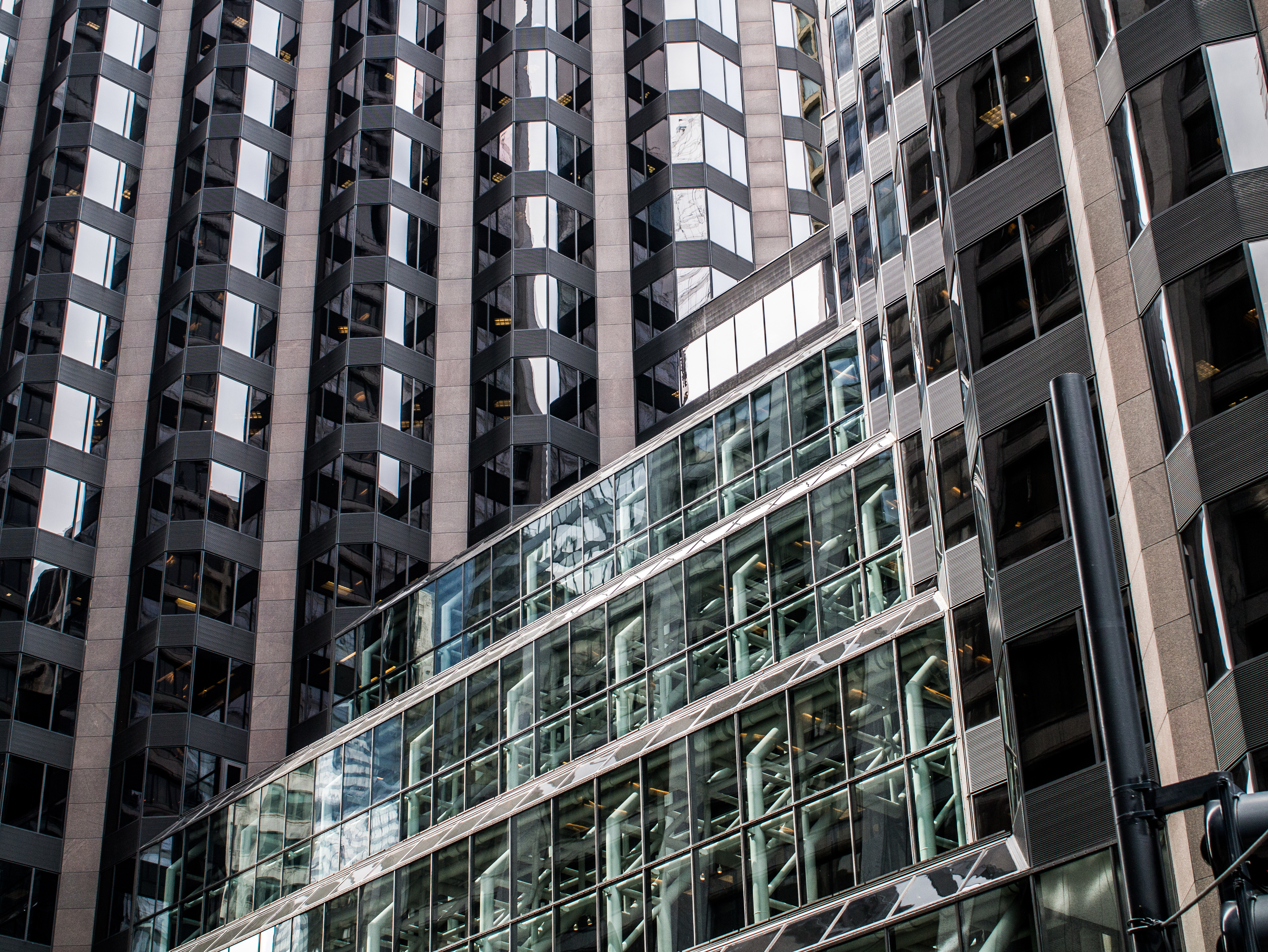
Three First National Plaza

== See also ==
- List of skyscrapers
- List of tallest buildings in the United States
- List of tallest buildings in Chicago
- World's tallest structures

== Position in Chicago's skyline ==
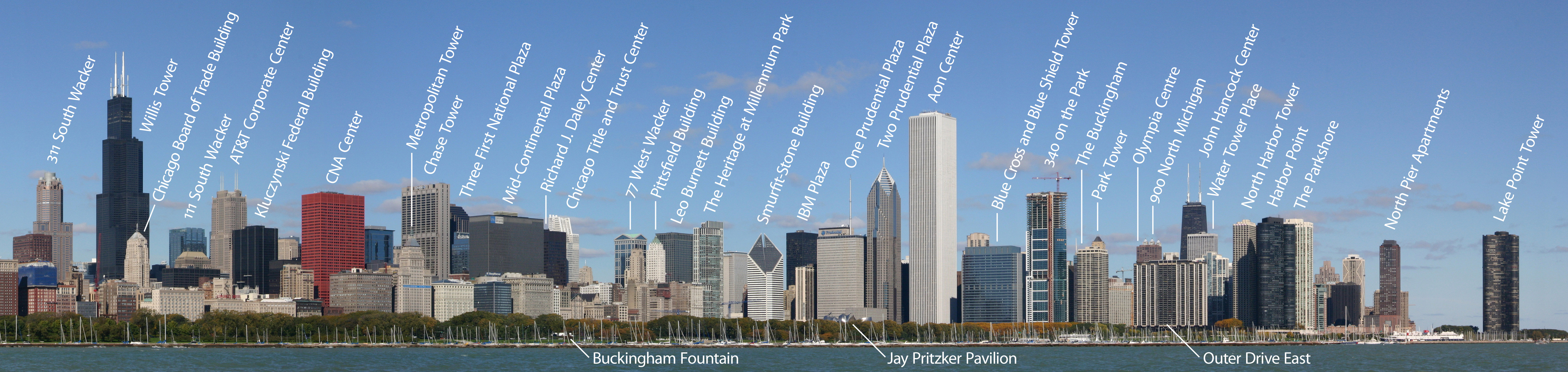
