= Computer Systems Institute =

American proprietary school

- Skokie, Illinois; United States

Information
- Type: Private for-profit school
- Established: 1989
- President: Julia Lowder
- Chairman: Ella Zibitsker
- Website: csinow.edu

Computer Systems Institute (CSI) is a private for-profit school headquartered in Skokie, Illinois. It was founded in 1989 by Ella Zibitsker, its current chairman of the board. CSI has six campus locations in the Chicago and Boston metro areas.

== History ==
Computer Systems Institute was founded in 1989 by Ella Zibitsker, its current chairman of the board. Julia Lowder is the current CEO. CSI offers a variety of career training programs and certificates in Computer Science, Business, and Healthcare.

In June 2011, CSI partnered with FORTE Knowledge in order to enhance its IT offerings in the Chicago area.

Since being founded in 1989, CSI has had over 10,000 graduates from 90+ countries.

=== 2016 loss of accreditation ===
In February 2016 the U.S. Department of Education took action due to: "...deceptive marketing practices and defraud [of] taxpayers by giving out student aid inappropriately. These unscrupulous institutions use questionable business practices or outright lie to both students and the federal government." (Under Secretary of Education for the United States Ted Mitchell) In April 2016, the institution's accreditor, the Accrediting Council for Independent Colleges and Schools (ACICS) "ordered [CSI] to show cause why its accreditation from ACICS should not be withdrawn."

Three programs were affected by the loss of accreditation and federal financial aid: Healthcare Career Program (HCP), Networking Career Program (NCP), and Business Career Program (BCP). Students enrolled in CSI's other programs, such as international students attending non-Title IV programs, were not directly affected by the losses.

The school subsequently gained accreditation from the Middle States Association of Colleges and Schools in 2023.

== Academics ==
CSI offers career training programs in Administration, Hospitality, Marketing, and English language programs.

=== Accreditation and approvals ===
CSI's accreditation by Accrediting Council for Independent Colleges and Schools (ASICS) was withdrawn by suspension on April 20, 2017. The suspension became final on May 8, 2017, after CSI failed to appeal. Six years later, the school earned accreditation from the Middle States Association Commissions on Elementary and Secondary Schools.

CSI is an approved training provider in Illinois, Wisconsin, and Indiana for the Workforce Investment Act. It is also approved by the Department of Veterans Affairs to accept GI Bill benefits. and authorized to enroll non immigrant F-1 and M-1 students.
