= Charles Edward Boutwood =

English painter

Charles Edward Boutwood, born in Luton in 1860 and died in 1937 in Polperro, was an English painter of the late 19th century and early 20th century. He would travel to France and the United States, where he would teach at the Chicago Art Institute.

== Biography ==
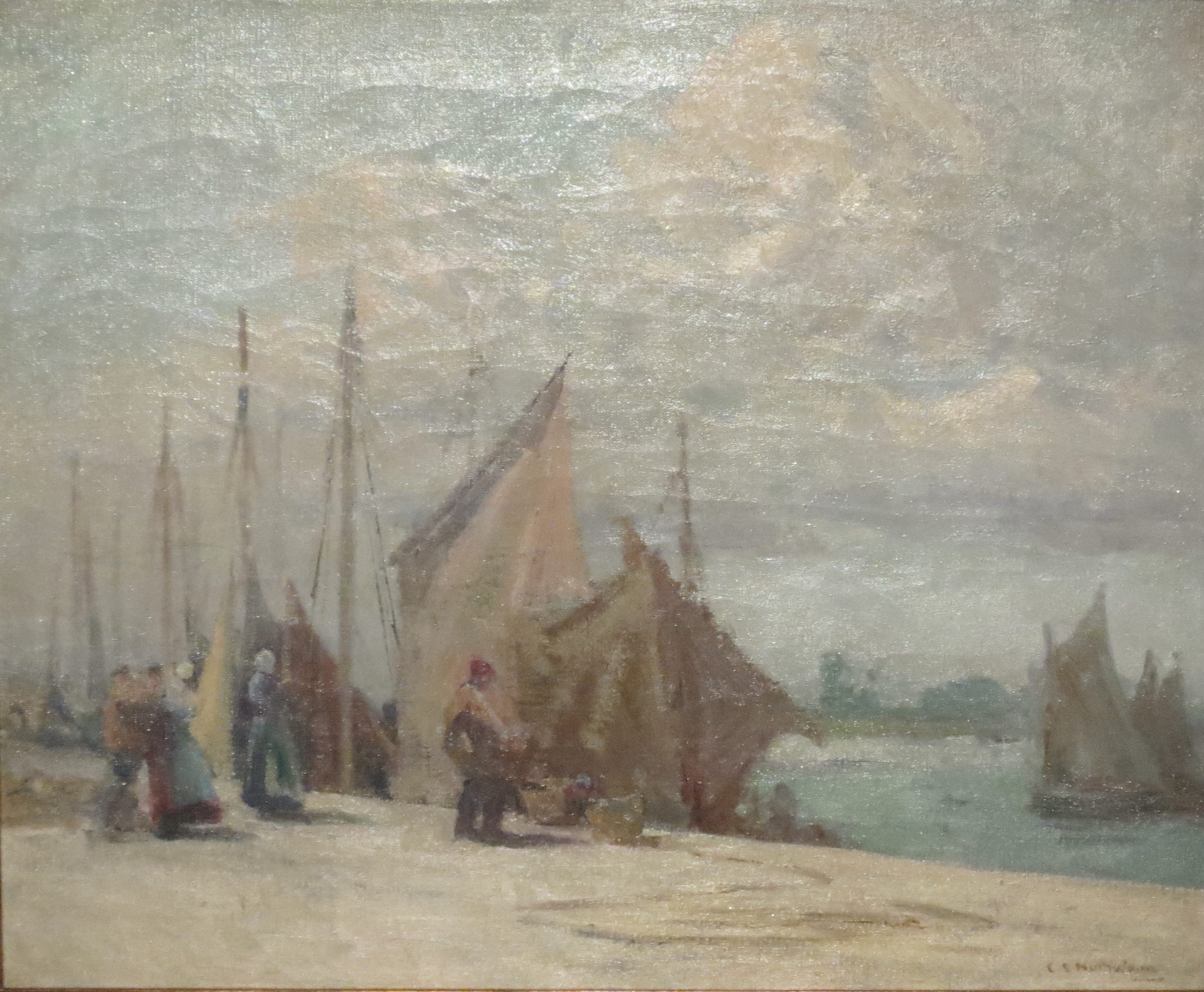
Coastal Scene with figures also known as On the quay, circa 1913

Charles Edward Boutwood received his initial art education at the Royal Academy in London. In Paris he continued his education. He visited Polperro, Cornwall, in the early 1880s with his friend Herbert E. Butler and made several paintings of the coastal village. He exhibited these at the Royal Academy in 1885. Butler would become his brother-in-law as the two married sisters (Thirza and Sophia Pond) of Polperro.

In 1888, in Chicago, he participated in the Art Institute's inaugural annual exhibition of American artists and helped found the Chicago Society of Artists, serving as its first president. He exhibited regularly at the Art Institute as well as other local exhibitions, including the Society of Western Artists and the Artists' Guild. He has won numerous awards.

He painted landscapes in England, France, and coastal Massachusetts, figurative works, genre scenes, and portraits, one of which was shown at the 1893 Chicago World's Fair. He produced watercolors and oils, and illustrated books, in the mid-1890s.

Boutwood taught for 25 years at the Art Institute, including an "advanced course in figure painting and portraiture. Among his students there was Myron G. Barlow, who would also travel to France and immerse himself in the art culture there. Boutwood traveled in the United States teaching, as well, between about 1889 and 1898. He and John Vanderpoel taught drawing at St. Joseph, Michigan, Oregon, Illinois, and Burlington and Delavan, Wisconsin.

Boutwood would return to France, traveling for inspiration with his painting. He lived temporarily in Trépied, at the Bramdeam villa, allée des Frênes, near the artistic colony of Étaples painting the port of Étaples.

He traveled frequently to find subjects for his paintings. Between 1913 and 1915, he lived in Trépied, near the artistic colony of Étaples painting the port of Étaples, the Canche river, and impressionist peasant scenes. These were well received in Chicago. He returned regularly to England and in 1916 he resigned from the faculty of the Art Institute to return permanently to Polperro, where he died in 1937.

== Public collections ==
- Étaples, Quentovic museum : Coastal Scene with figures also known as On the quay, oil on canvas, circa 1913.
