= 35 East Wacker =

Office skyscraper in Chicago, Illinois

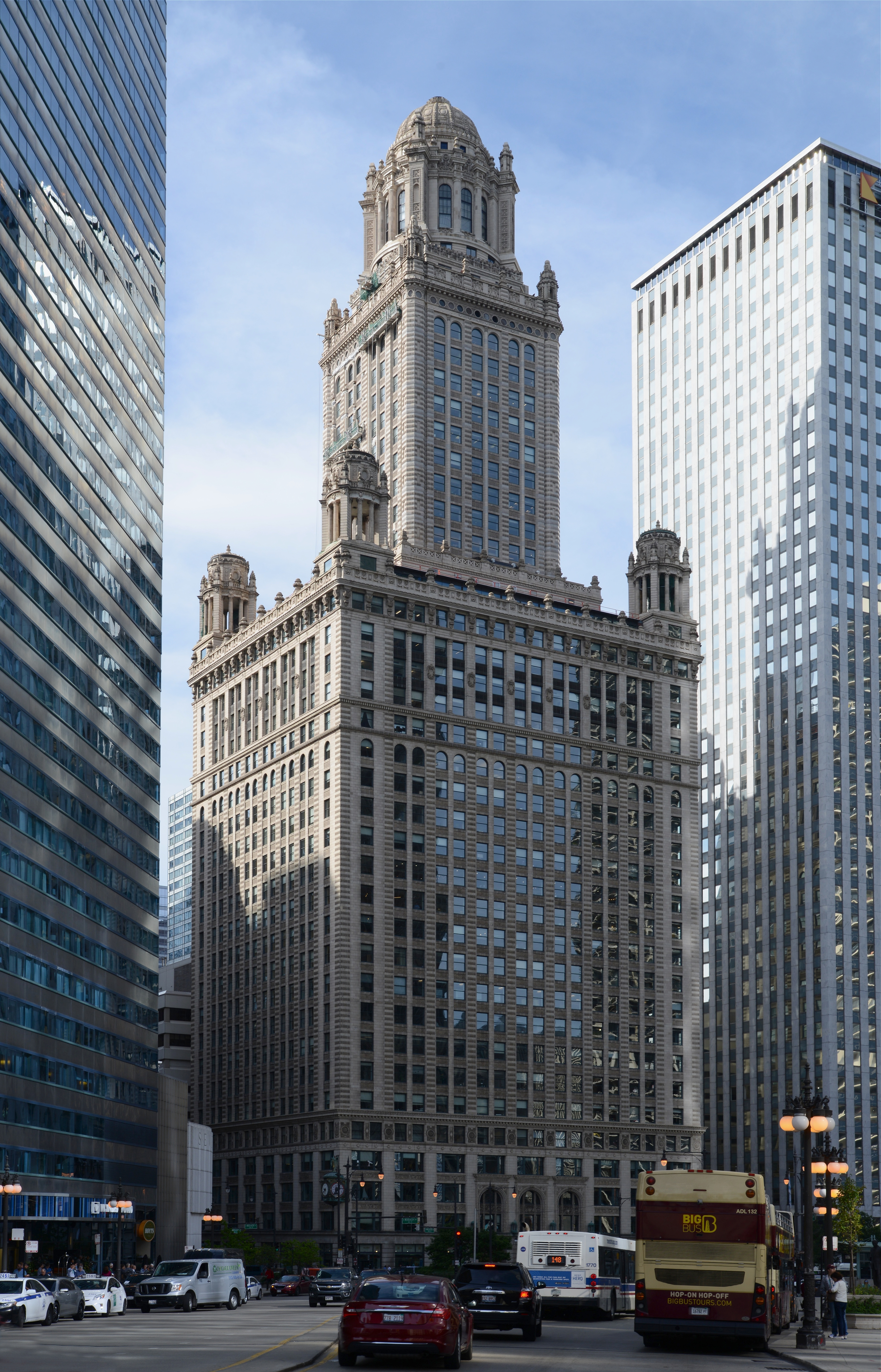

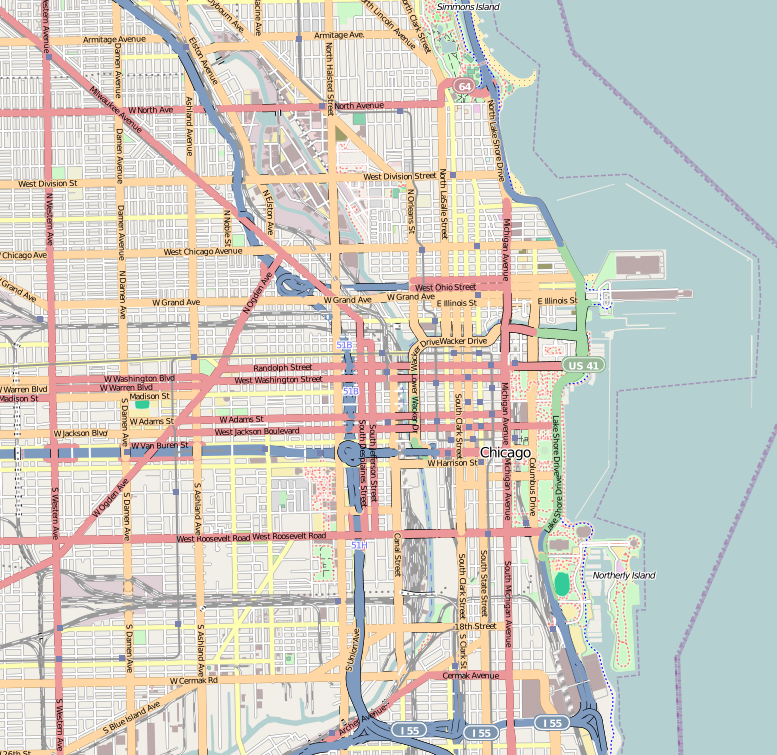
- Location within Central Chicago Location within Illinois Location within the United States
- Former names: Pure Oil Building, North American Life Building, Jewelers Building

General information
- Type: Commercial offices
- Location: 35 E. Wacker Drive, Chicago, Illinois
- Coordinates: 41.8865°N 87.6268°W
- Current tenants: See Tenants
- Construction started: 1925
- Completed: 1927
- Client: Opal Holdings, LLC.
- Operator: Opal Holdings, LLC.

Height
- Roof: 523 ft (159 m)

Technical details
- Floor count: 40

Design and construction
- Architects: Joachim Giæver; Frederick P. Dinkelberg
- Developer: Opal Holdings, LLC.
- Main contractor: Starrett-Dilks Company
- North American Life Insurance Building
- U.S. Historic district – Contributing property
- Architectural style: Neoclassical
- Part of: Michigan–Wacker Historic District (ID78001124)
- Designated CP: 1978

35 East Wacker, also known as the Jewelers' Building, is a 40-story 523 ft (159 m) historic building in the Loop community area of Chicago, Illinois, United States, located at the intersection of Wabash Avenue and East Wacker Drive, facing the Chicago River. It was built from 1925 to 1927, and was co-designed by Joachim Giæver and Frederick P. Dinkelberg. At the time of its completion in 1927, it was the tallest building in the world outside New York City. Formerly the Pure Oil Building and North American Life Insurance Building, 35 East Wacker was listed in 1978 as a contributing property to the Michigan–Wacker Historic District on the National Register of Historic Places, and was designated a Chicago Landmark on February 9, 1994.

For its first 14 years, the building had a car lift that served the first 23 floors, later converted to office space. There was no access between the offices and the parking garage, except at the Lower Wacker Drive level, where drivers would leave their cars with an attendant.

The dome at the top of the building once held the showroom of architect Helmut Jahn. Before that, it was home to the Stratosphere Club, a restaurant often erroneously said to be run by Al Capone. (In reality, the Stratosphere Club opened in 1937, long after Capone was imprisoned and too late for the building to have been an illegal speakeasy.) The building is currently being renovated, by Goettsch Partners, and the façade is being maintained, but the interiors converted into a more modern configuration. Both the Chicago chapter of the American Institute of Architects and the City of Chicago have recognized the renovation project with awards.

== Architecture ==
=== Body ===
The main body of 35 East Wacker Drive is 23 stories tall with an 18 story tower. It has three basements, which were originally for mechanical, maintenance, and garage entry spaces. The first floor is clad in gray limestone, but almost the entire exterior above the first floor is clad in tan-colored terracotta.

The building's main body is evocative of secular palaces of 15th-century Italy, such as the Palazzo Medici Riccardi, save its towers. The first four floors form a base, with large horizontal windows and Renaissance-inspired arches over the main entrance. The fifth floor has a cornice and provides a sense of closure for the floors below, and marks the transition to the window arrangement of the succeeding element of the composition. The next pattern of windows is standard, with each floor having seven pairs of windows which are bookended with distinct corner elements with one window. On the eighteenth floor, arches replace the lintels which were on every preceding window. The nineteenth floor has classical string course moldings above and below, but that is the only distinction it holds. Floors 20 to 22 continue with this, with some rustication replaced with ashlar, and coats-of-arms added between the windows on the 21st floor. The windows of the 23rd floor are incorporated into the crowning element, separated with brackets that support the cornice and balusters above. There are open towers on the four corners on the roof, before the beginning of the tower. They are meant to hide the water towers for that building. The design is based on the lanterns used atop the domes of some church buildings of the Italian Renaissance.

There are references to Italian Renaissance palace design in that its procedure from banded rustication on the first floor to the open arches surrounding the second and third floor windows, and on to the most highly finished features on the upper floors and at the cornice. There are rusticated quoins on the corners which provide some similarity between all the floors. The ascending order of the elements with the most diverse and aggressive aesthetics on the street level transitioning to be more conservative, reserved, and sophisticated as the floors climb higher was a feature of many Renaissance Italian urban palaces.

=== Tower ===
The tower rises 18 stories above the main building with two transitory floors. The 24th floor is covered by balusters which surround the perimeter of the main block of the building on its top floor. It was originally used for mechanical systems. The 25th floor visually functions as the base of the tower. It is wider, that the rest of the tower but narrower than the base from which it came, like the 24th floor, and has a few windows laced with bands of rustication, which gives the impression it is carrying the tower. This floor is crowned with a dentil cornice and baluster which border a promenade from the 26th floor. The exterior look of the 26th to 35th floor mimics that of the sixth through 18th floors. The corner elements of the tower are hexagonal.

The cornice atop the 35th floor is a transition from the square shaft of the tower and the circular plan of the floors above, which eventually climax in a dome. The 36th floor was designed for use as a storage and refrigeration level for the kitchen on the 37th floor. The floors 38th, 39th, and 40th were connected by spiral staircases. The 38th floor was a lounge, the 39th as a restaurant, and the 40th had 30 foot ceilings with massive arches. This was the belvedere level, and a dining space. The 41st floor was more mechanical systems. There was an oculus in the center of the dome, which was a vent for the original heating plant.

=== Architecture ===
Although 35 East Wacker Drive generally follows early Renaissance precedent, its design is eclectic, blending secular and ecclesiastical motifs. While its massing recalls large Renaissance palazzi, details such as the rectangular frames around arches, the portal designs with circular tondi, and the lantern and dome atop the tower reflect church models. Contemporary marketing even claimed inspiration from the 15th-century Certosa di Pavia, famous for its decorative richness. Carl Condit later observed that terra cotta was here used “more lavishly for strictly ornamental ends” than anywhere else in Chicago, the surface being encrusted in a manner recalling Baroque architecture. The link to Pavia is clear in the arches, cornices, balusters, and relief panels, as well as in the spiral staircases of the lobby, modeled on those of the monastery.

The terra cotta treatment departs from Renaissance precedent. Unlike the colorful slip-glazed panels of the Della Robbia in 15th-century Florence, the building’s surface is largely monochrome tan, relieved only by dark green accents at the 20th–22nd floors.

Functionally, the building was innovative for its vast internal parking facility. Following the courtyard-block type, but surrounded on all sides by streets and alleys, it allowed every office access to light and air, freeing the core for parking. Cars entered from Lower Wacker Drive and were raised by elevators to upper floors, where a mechanized system placed them in preassigned spaces. This was one of the largest automated parking facilities of its time.

Among its early tenants were jewelers, watch companies, Borg-Warner, Rotary International, and the Quarry Company. The six-ton clock at Wabash and Wacker, donated by Elgin National Watch Company, became a landmark. Rumors also placed a Capone-era speakeasy in the tower lounge, though without documentation—a story rendered ironic given the presence of Illinois’ liquor commissioner among the tenants.

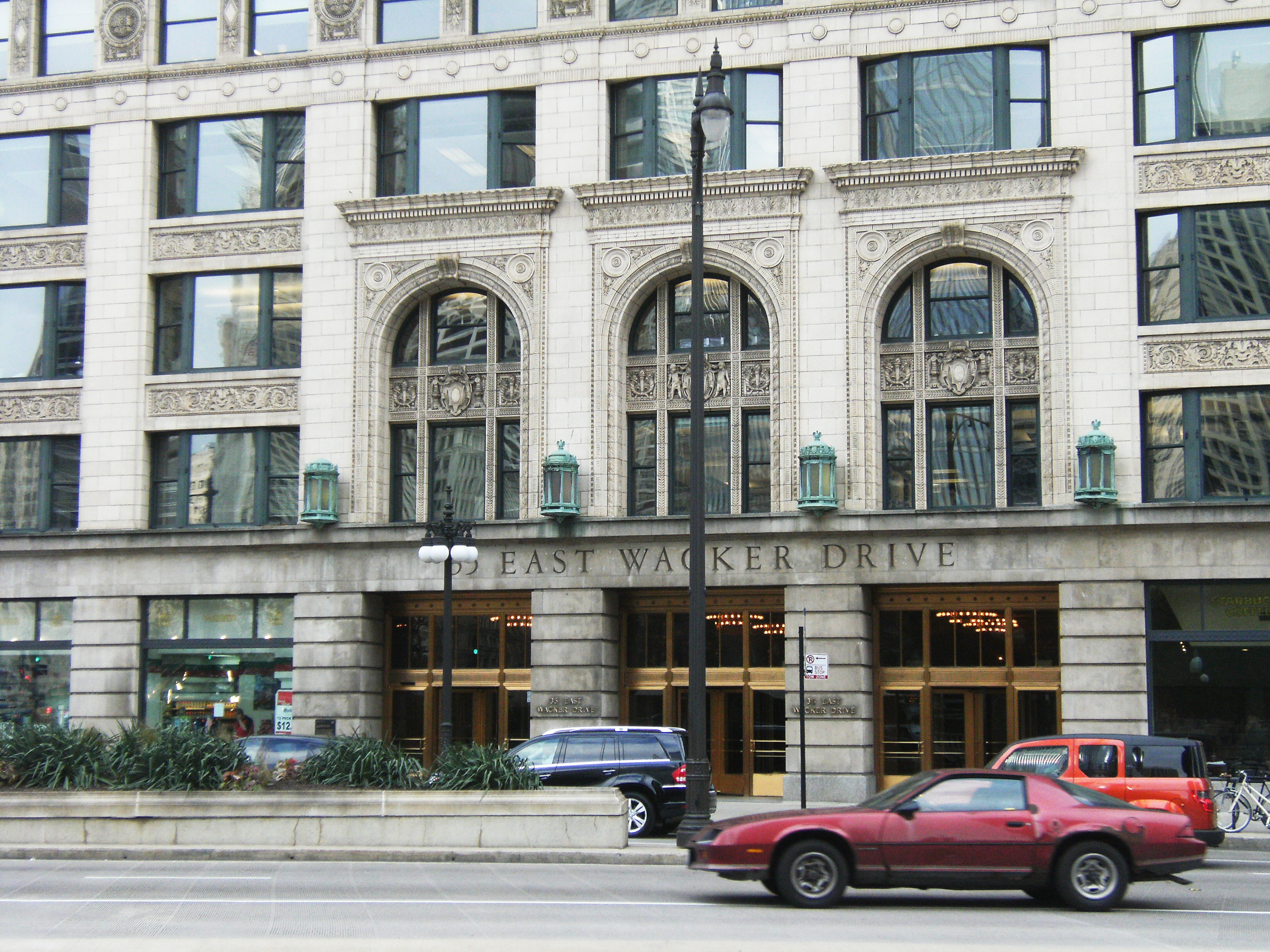
The ground-floor of 35 East Wacker. Note the horizontal, gray limestone, which gives way to a corniced floor, after which the window pattern changes.

== Tenants ==
- Mercury Records (1950–1973)
- Feeding America (1999–2003)
- Sigma Chi fraternity headquarters (1932–1951)
- American Institute of Architects Chicago (Suite 250)
- SmithGroup (Suite 900)
- Serge Bertucci
- Clayco (Suite 1300)
- CRG (Suite 1400)
- Ventana (Suite 1400)
- Lamar Johnson Collaborative (Suite 1500)

== In popular culture ==
- The building was featured in the TV series Bob.
- The building is featured in scenes of the 2005 film Batman Begins.
- The 2011 film Transformers: Dark of the Moon features a climax set atop the building, which is heavily damaged, along with most of Chicago, in the giant robot battle that ensues.
- In 2012, episode 2 of the first season of United States of America on the American History Channel featured the building's historic elevator, made by the Otis Elevator Company.
- The building is shown in the TV series The Good Wife as the location of the law firm Lockhart/Gardner.
- Emergency Call Ambulance (Sega 1999), Arcade racing videogame. The player drives by this building in the third case. In the game however, a burning gas station that has no relation to reality, is located at the bottom of this building.
- The building is a prominent landmark within the fictional city of Lost Heaven in the video game Mafia, and appears also in the remake Mafia: Definitive Edition.

== Gallery ==
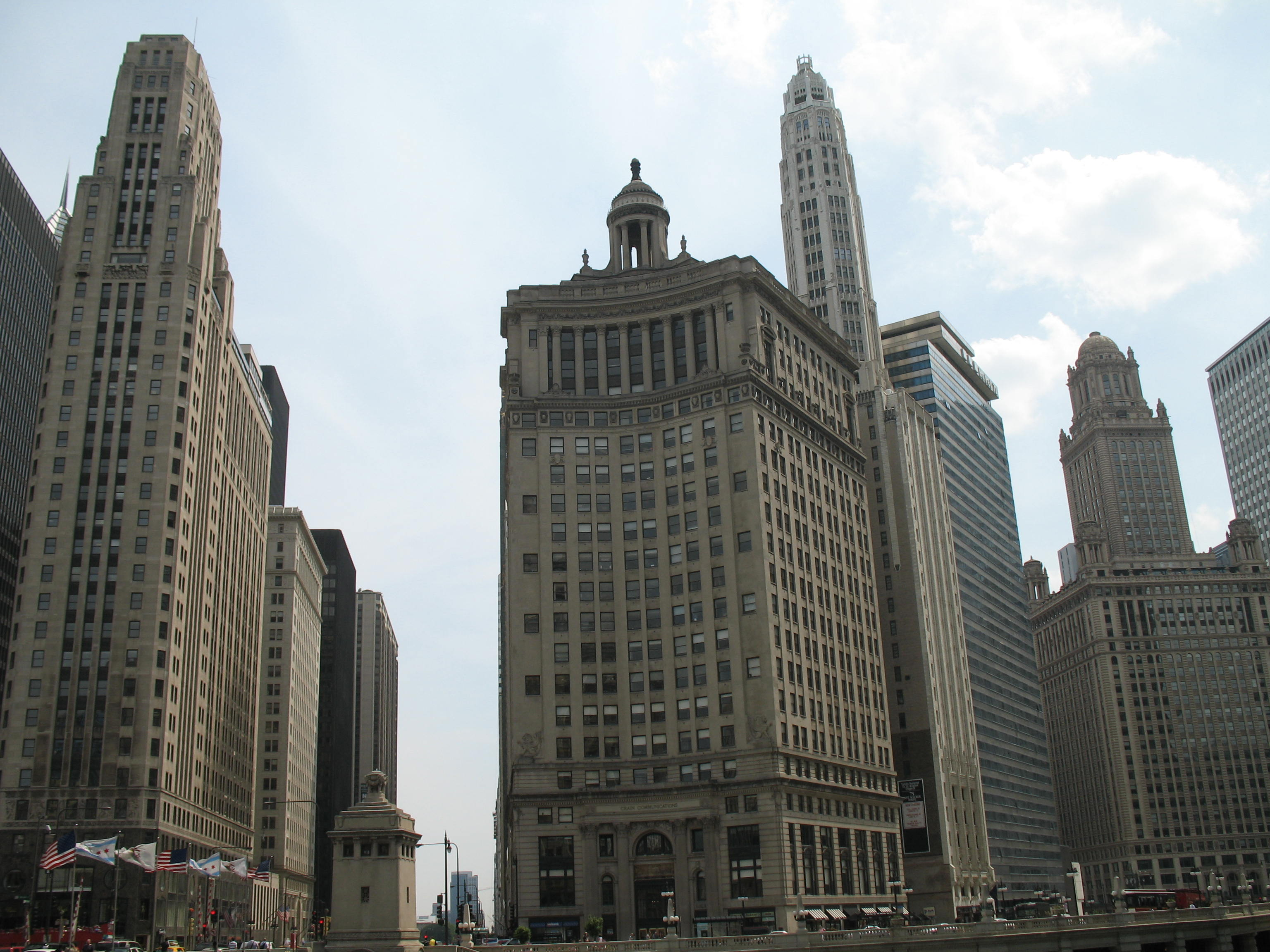
333 North Michigan, 360 North Michigan, Mather Tower and 35 East Wacker

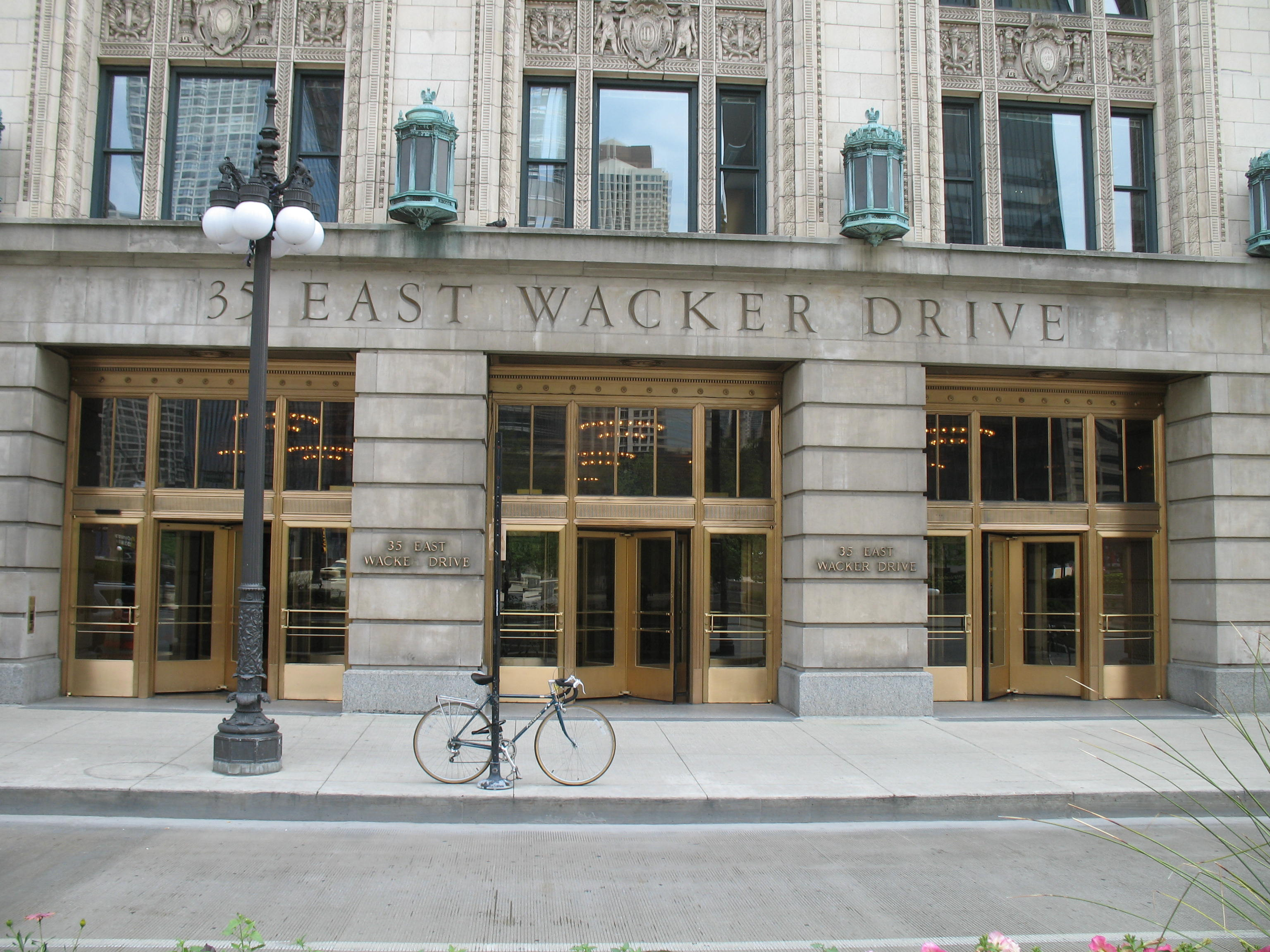
Wacker Drive entrance.

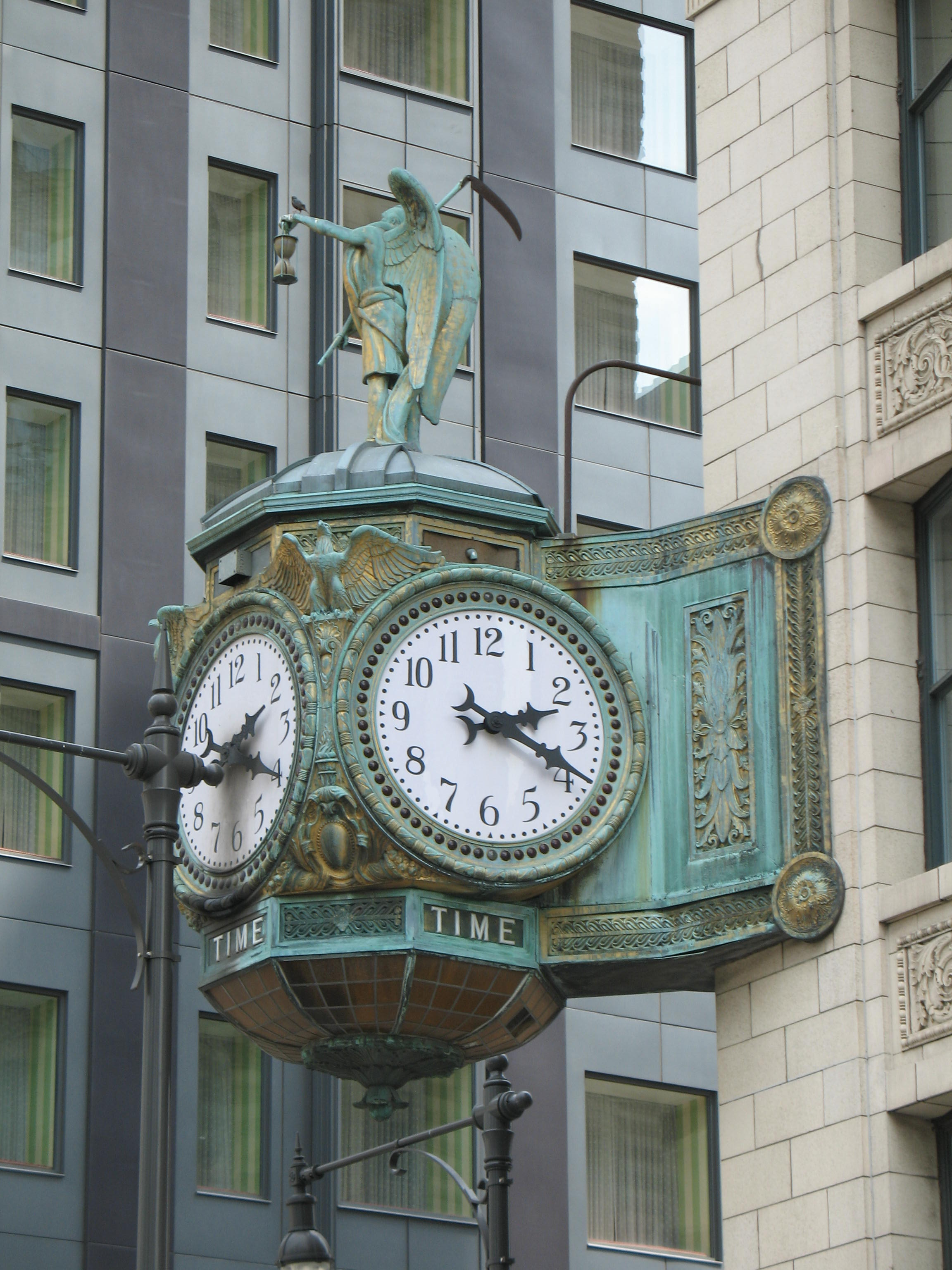
Clock on the northeast corner

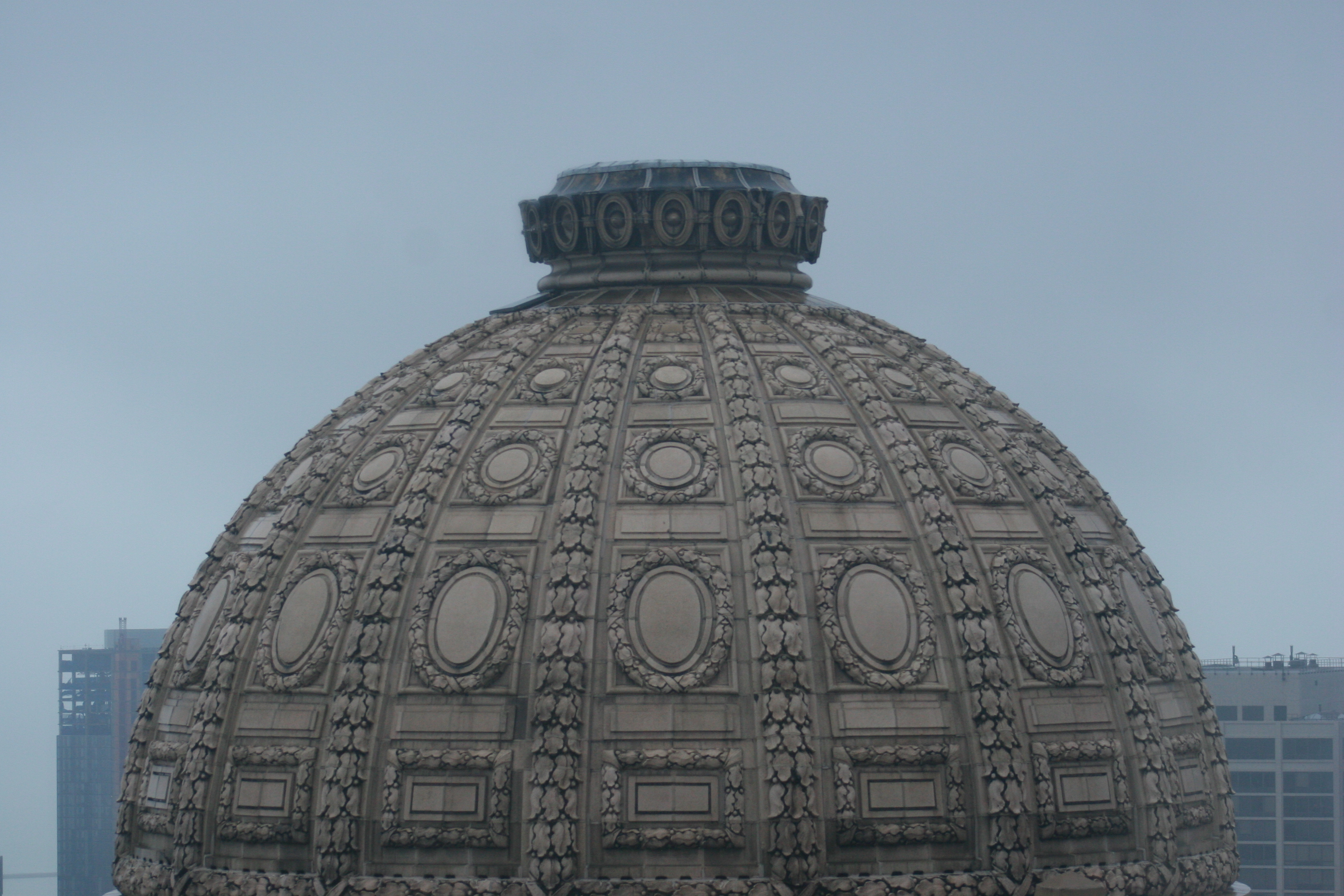
Dome atop the building

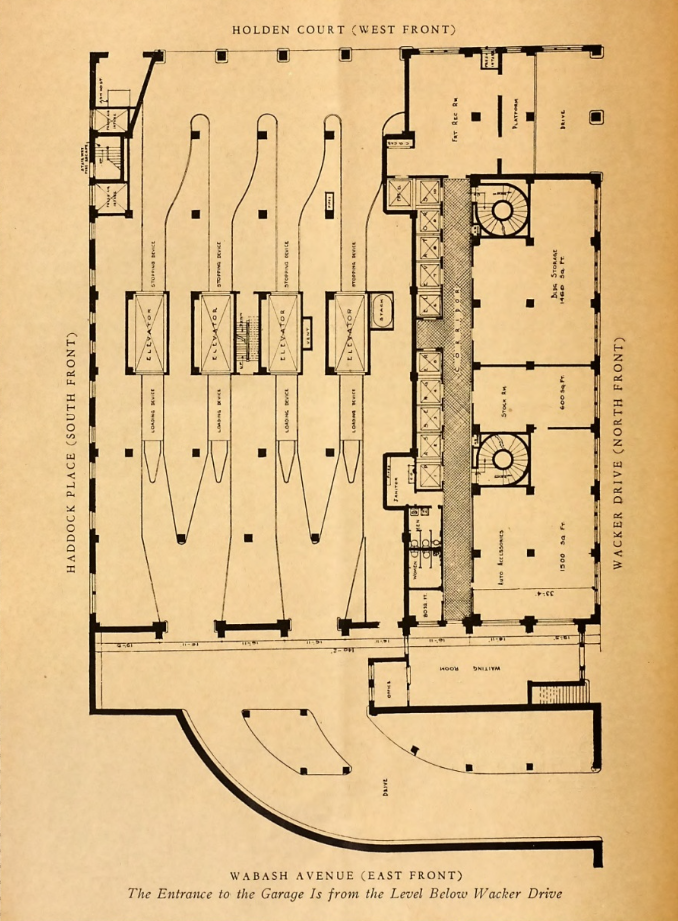
Original plan showing car elevators
