= Daniel Burnham Jr. =

American architect (1886–1961)

Daniel Hudson Burnham Jr.
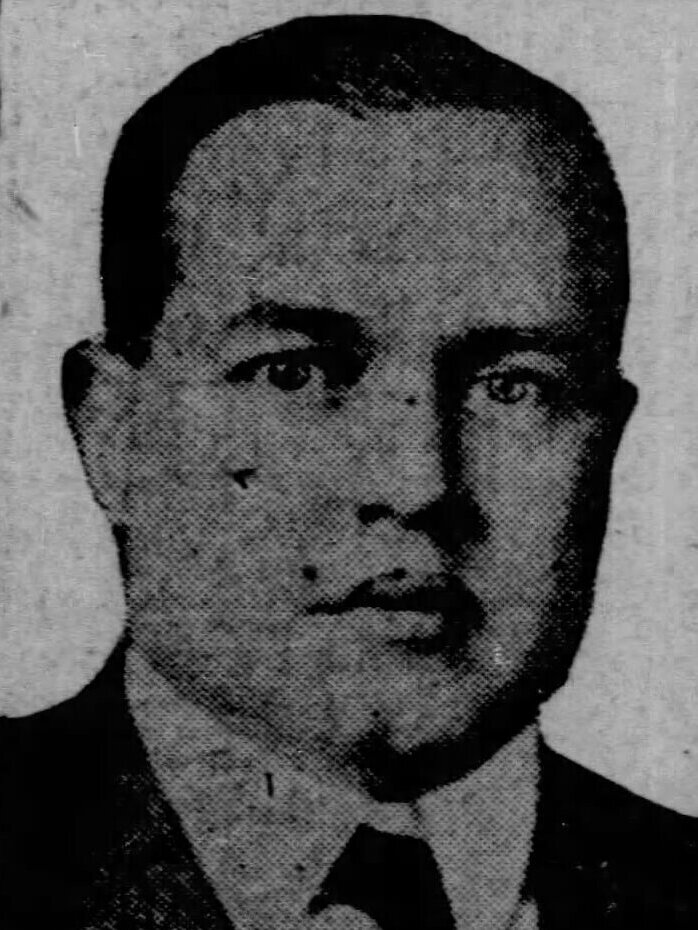
- Born: February 22, 1886; Chicago, Illinois, US
- Died: November 3, 1961 (aged 75); Lake Barrington, Illinois, US
- Occupation: Architect

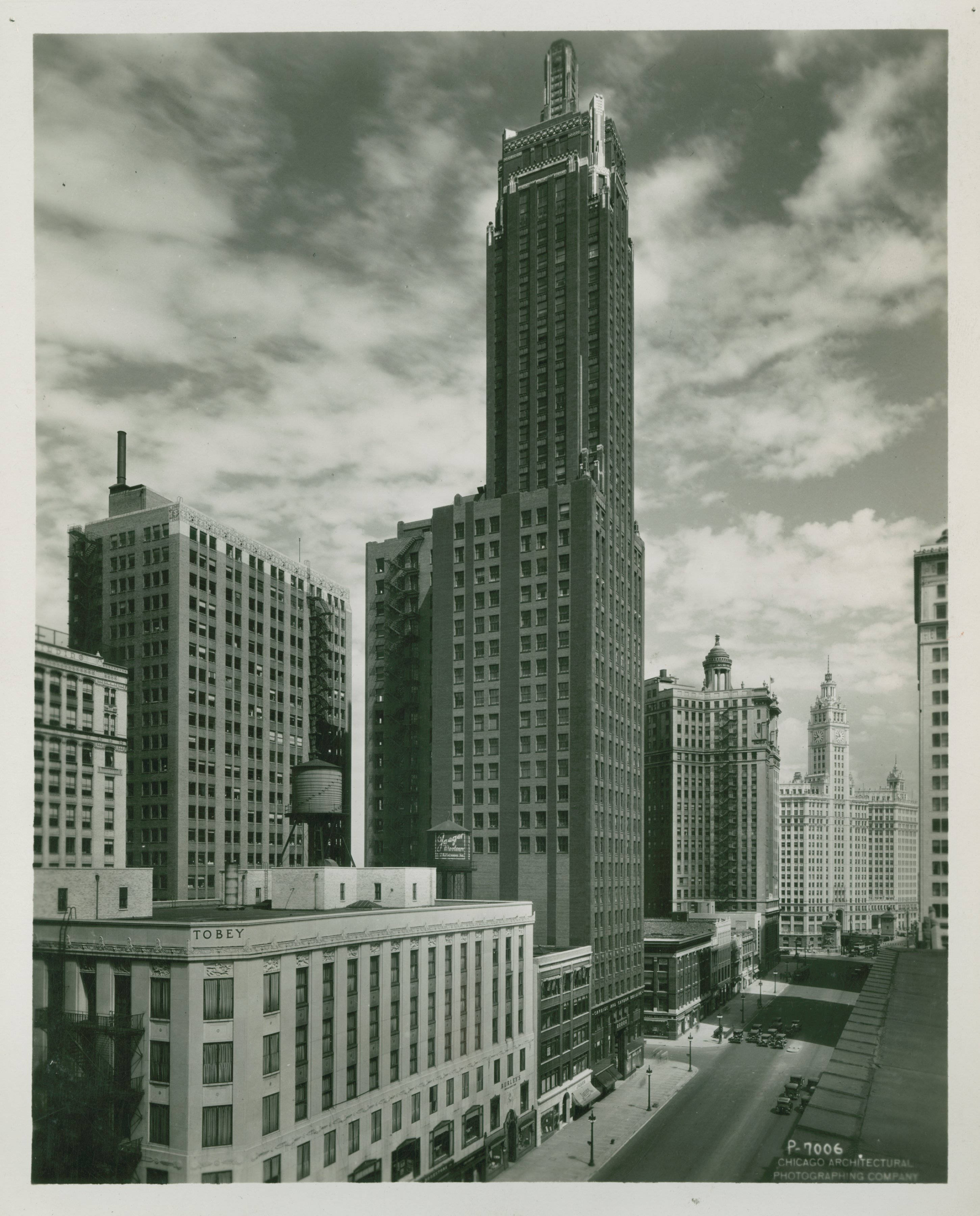
The Carbide & Carbon Building in Chicago, designed by Burnham Brothers, completed in 1929

Daniel Hudson Burnham Jr. (1886–1961), was an architect and urban planner based in Chicago and one of the sons of the renowned architect and urban planner Daniel H. Burnham. Burnham Jr. was director of public works for the Century of Progress 1933-34 World's Fair in Chicago, the same role his father held for the World's Columbian Exposition of 1893.

== Life and career ==
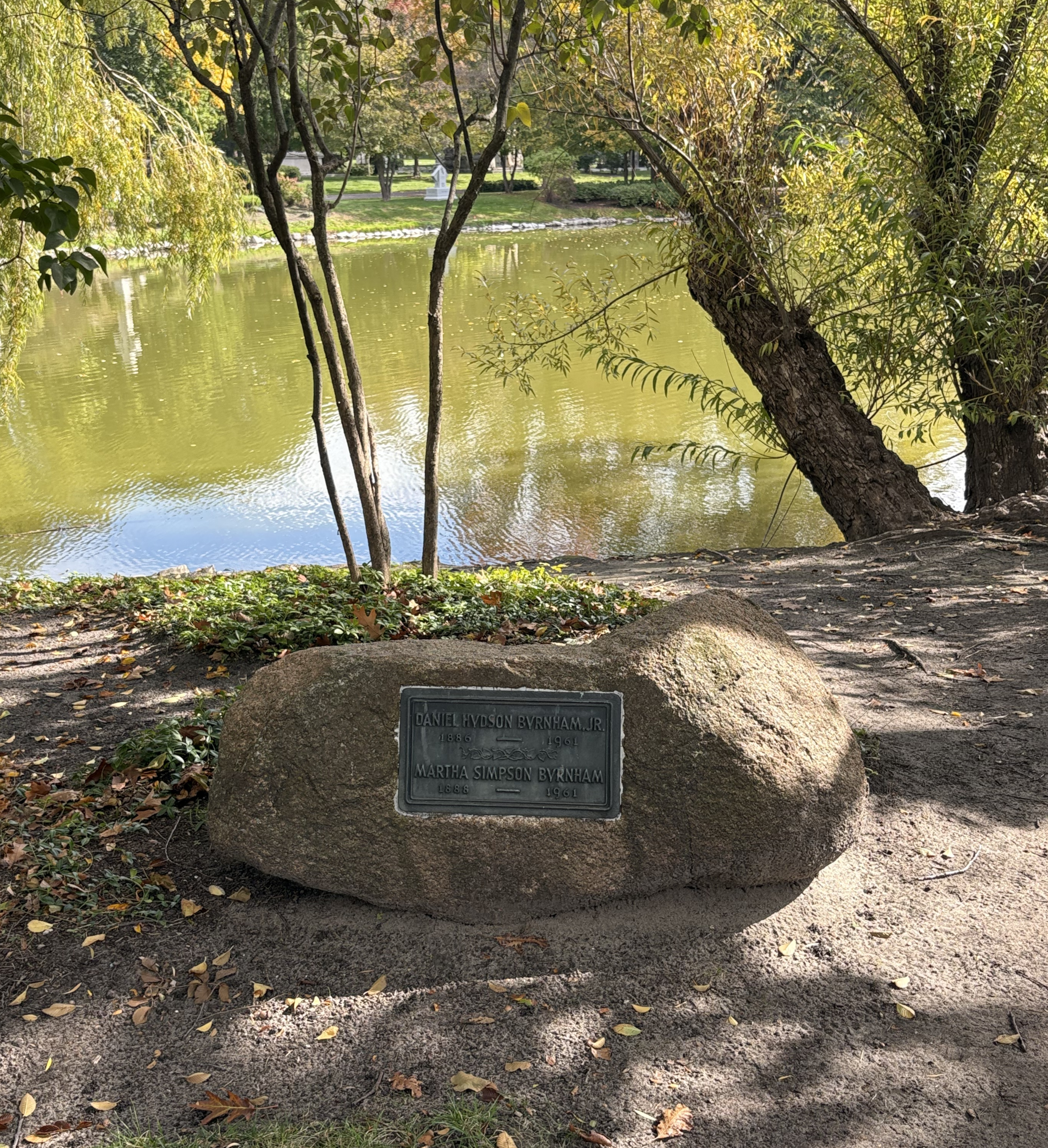
Burnham's grave at Graceland Cemetery

Burnham trained at the Ecole des Beaux-Arts in Paris and worked in his father's firm, D. H. Burnham & Company, until after Burnham's death. In 1917 he and his brother, Hubert Burnham, left the successor firm of Graham, Burnham & Company to found their own firm, Burnham Brothers. The old firm, which had been the world's largest architecture firm under Daniel Burnham, was taken over by Ernest Graham and operated for approximately 90 years as Graham, Anderson, Probst & White.

In 1933 Burnham left the firm, and Hubert Burnham formed a new partnership with C. Herrick Hammond called Burnham & Hammond. For six years he was in private practice before returning to his brother with Burnham & Hammond. He practiced with the firm until his retirement in 1959.

Burnham and his wife Martha were killed in an auto accident in Lake Barrington, Illinois on November 3, 1961. They were buried at Graceland Cemetery in Chicago.

== Architectural works ==
- Joliet Central High School additions, Joliet, Illinois (1917, 1922, 1924 and 1931, NRHP 1982)
- L. F. Beach Company Department Store, Joliet, Illinois (1919)
- First National Bank Building, Amboy, Illinois (1921)
- Childs Building, Chicago, Illinois (1922–23, demolished)
- Morley Brothers Department Store, Saginaw, Michigan (1922, demolished 1981)
- Mary Walker Hotel, Joliet, Illinois (1922)
- Burnham Building, Chicago, Illinois (1924)
- Central Life Building, Chicago, Illinois (1924, demolished)
- Dunham Building, Chicago, Illinois (1925, demolished)
- Joliet Chamber of Commerce Building, Joliet, Illinois (1925)
- Seneca Hotel, Chicago, Illinois (1926)
- Clark Adams Building, Chicago, Illinois (1927)
- Medical and Dental Arts Building, Chicago, Illinois (1927)
- Engineering Building, Chicago, Illinois (1928)
- Randolph-Wells Building addition, Chicago, Illinois (1928)
- YMCA Building, Joliet, Illinois (1928, NRHP 2006)
- Carbide & Carbon Building, Chicago, Illinois (1929)
- Loop Center Building, Chicago, Illinois (1929)
- Southbridge National Bank Building, Southbridge, Massachusetts (1929)
- Union National Bank Building, Eau Claire, Wisconsin (1930, NRHP 1983)
- United States Custom House, (Note: Designed with associate architects Nimmons, Carr & Wright.) Chicago, Illinois (1933, NRHP 2016)
- Thornton Township High School additions, (Note: Designed with associate architect H. Frederick Beck.) Harvey, Illinois (1938)
- Berwyn Municipal Building, Berwyn, Illinois (1939, NRHP 2001)

== Gallery of architectural works ==
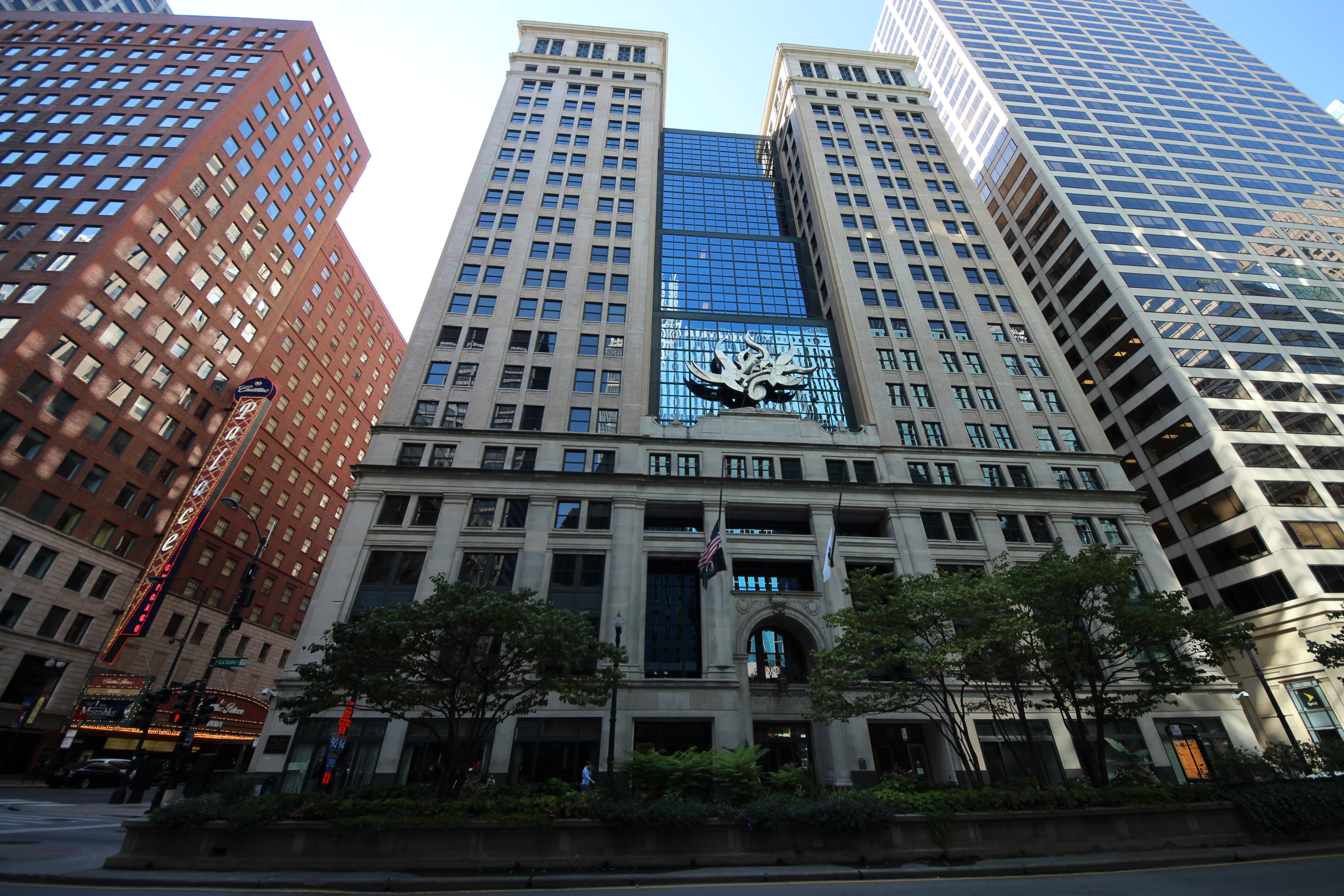
Burnham Building, Chicago, Illinois, 1924

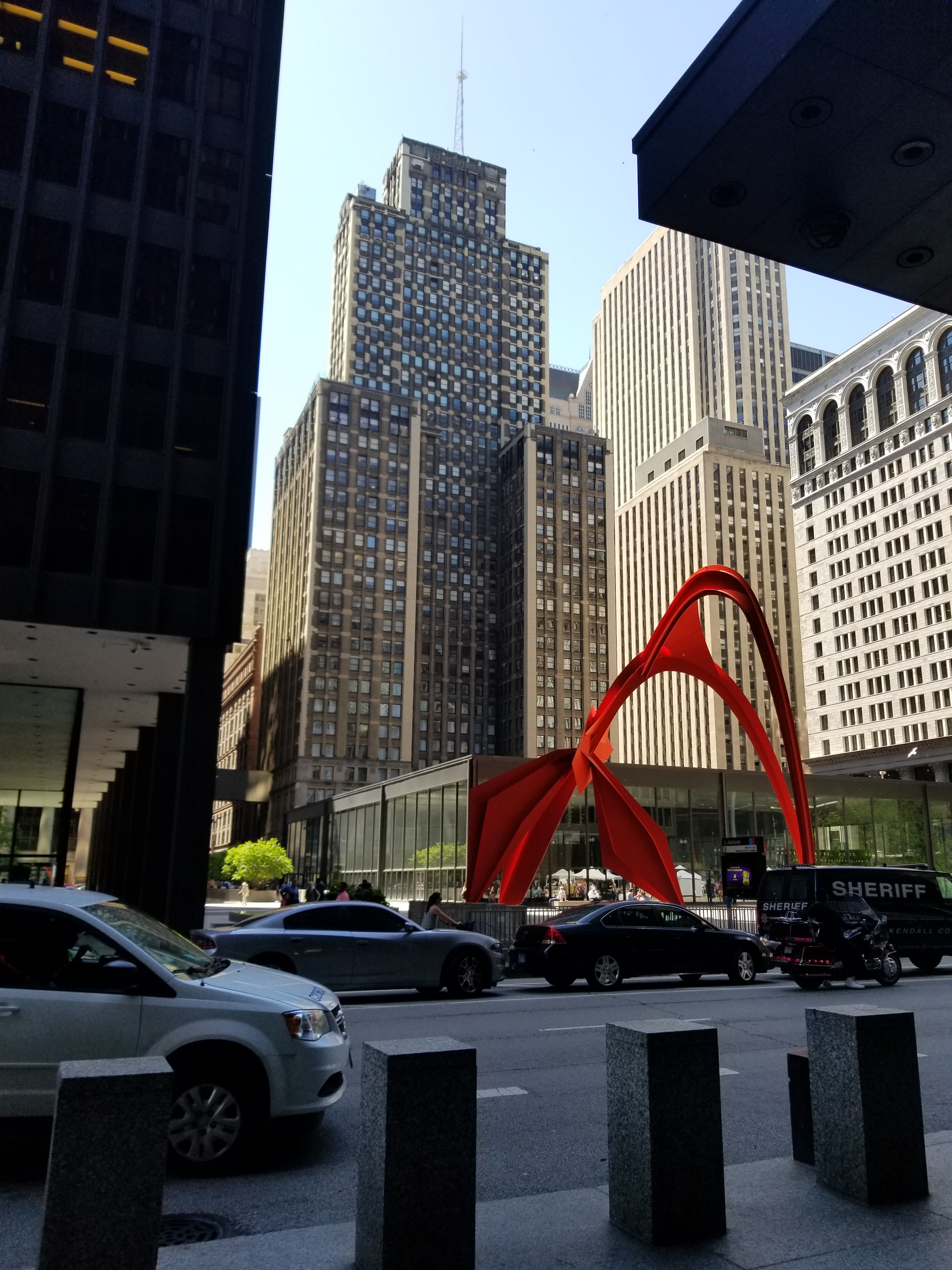
Clark Adams Building, Chicago, Illinois, 1927

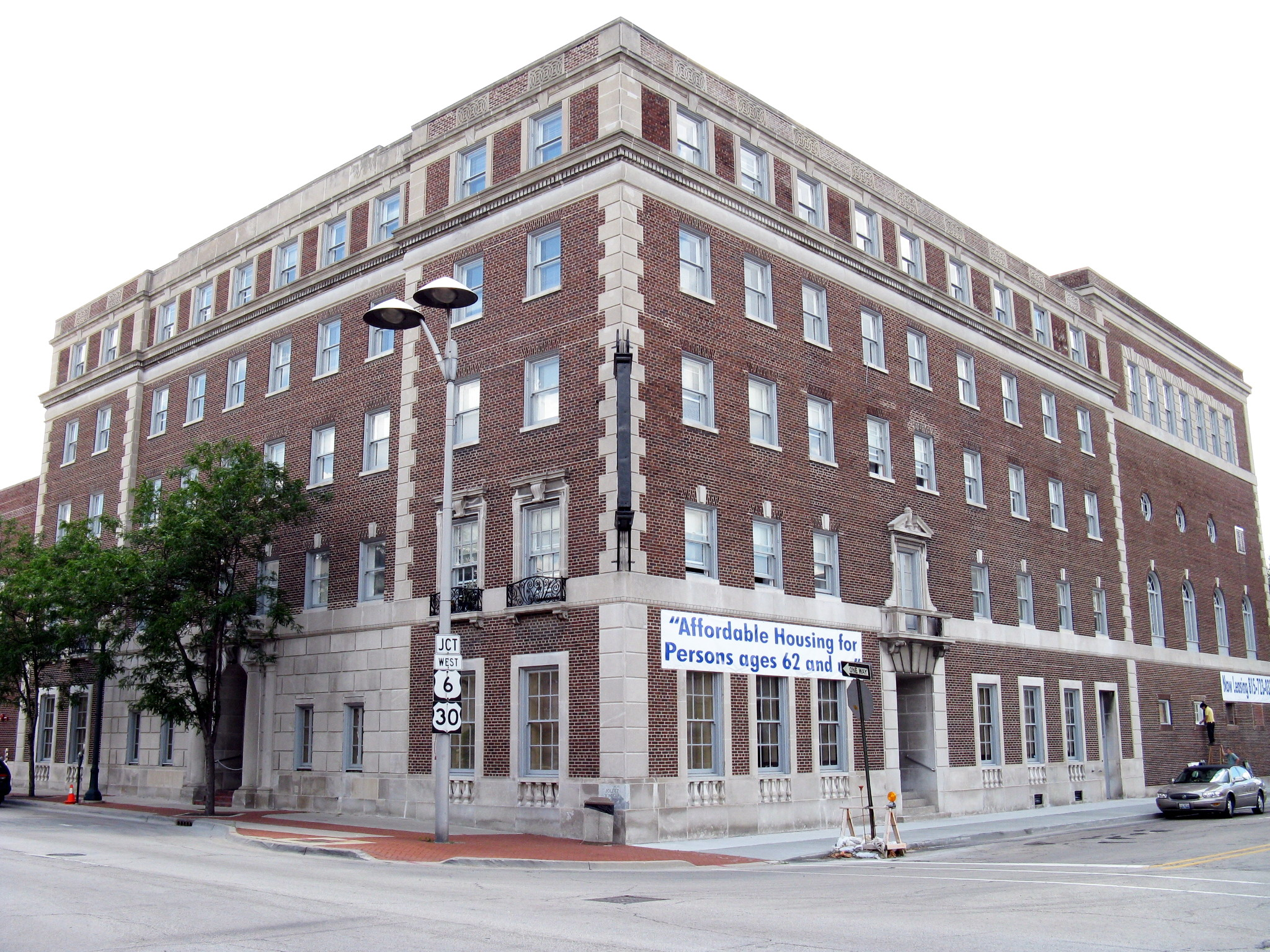
YMCA Building, Joliet, Illinois, 1928

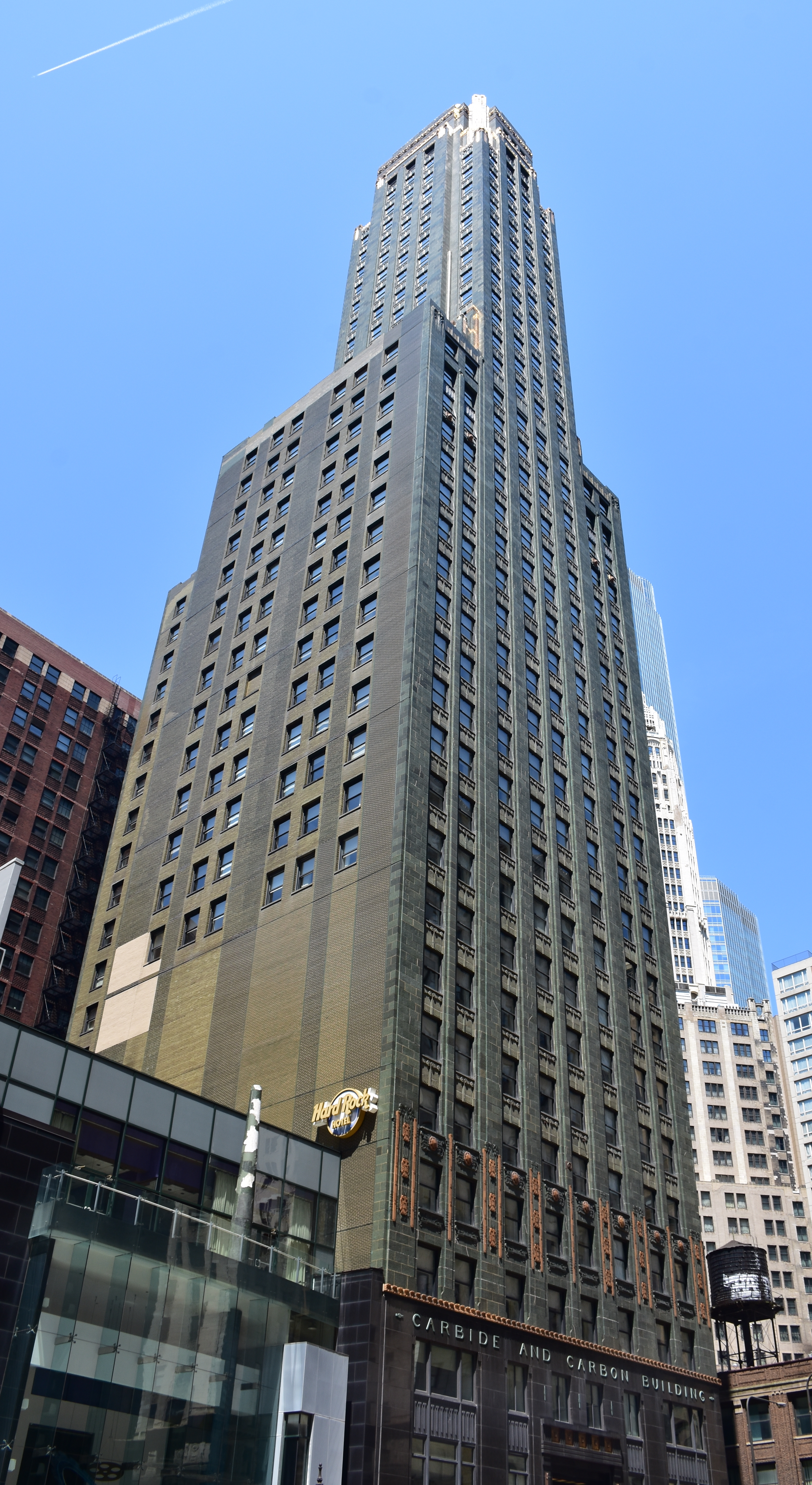
Carbide & Carbon Building, Chicago, Illinois, 1929

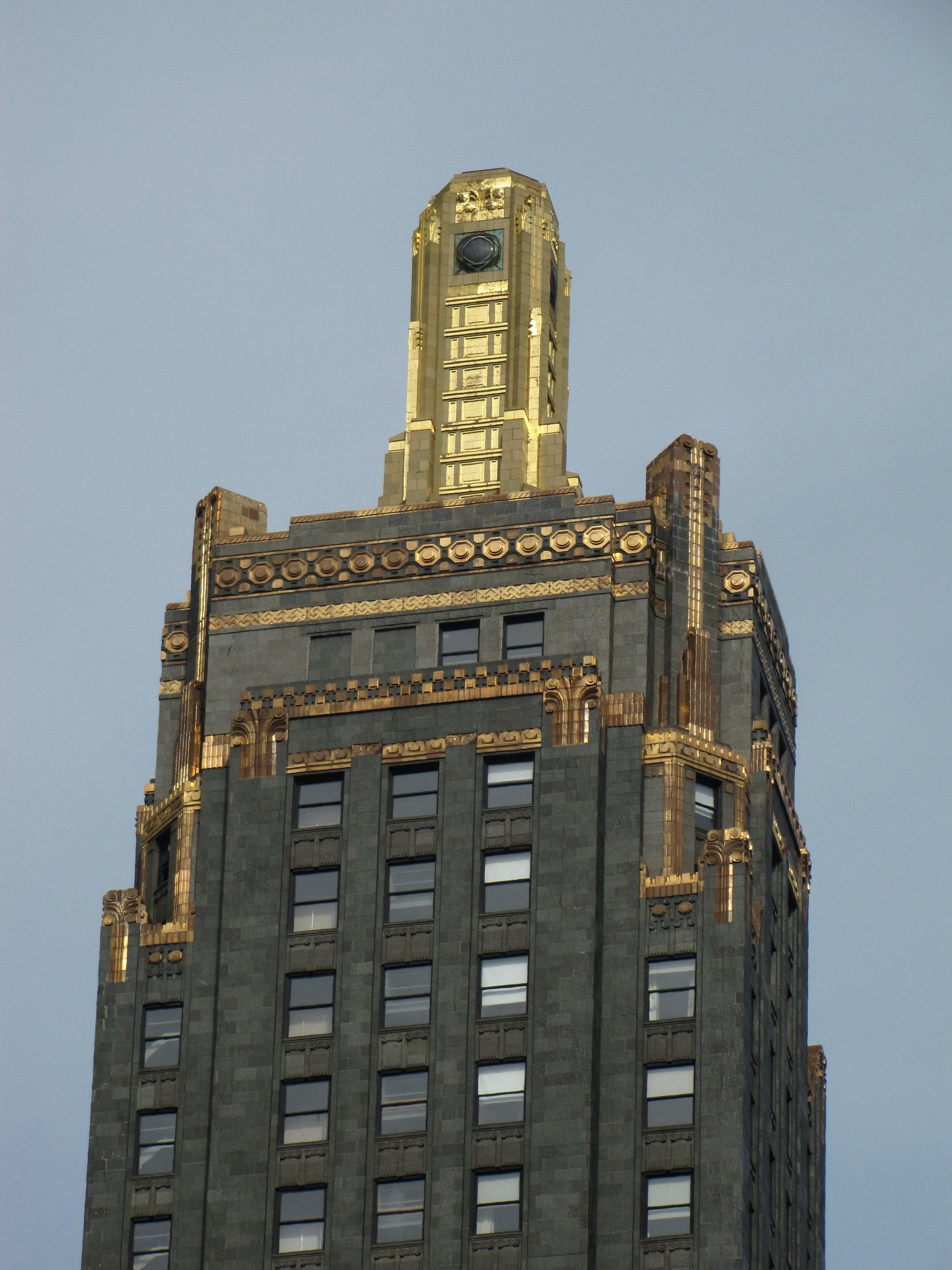
Detail of the Carbide & Carbon Building, Chicago, Illinois, 1929

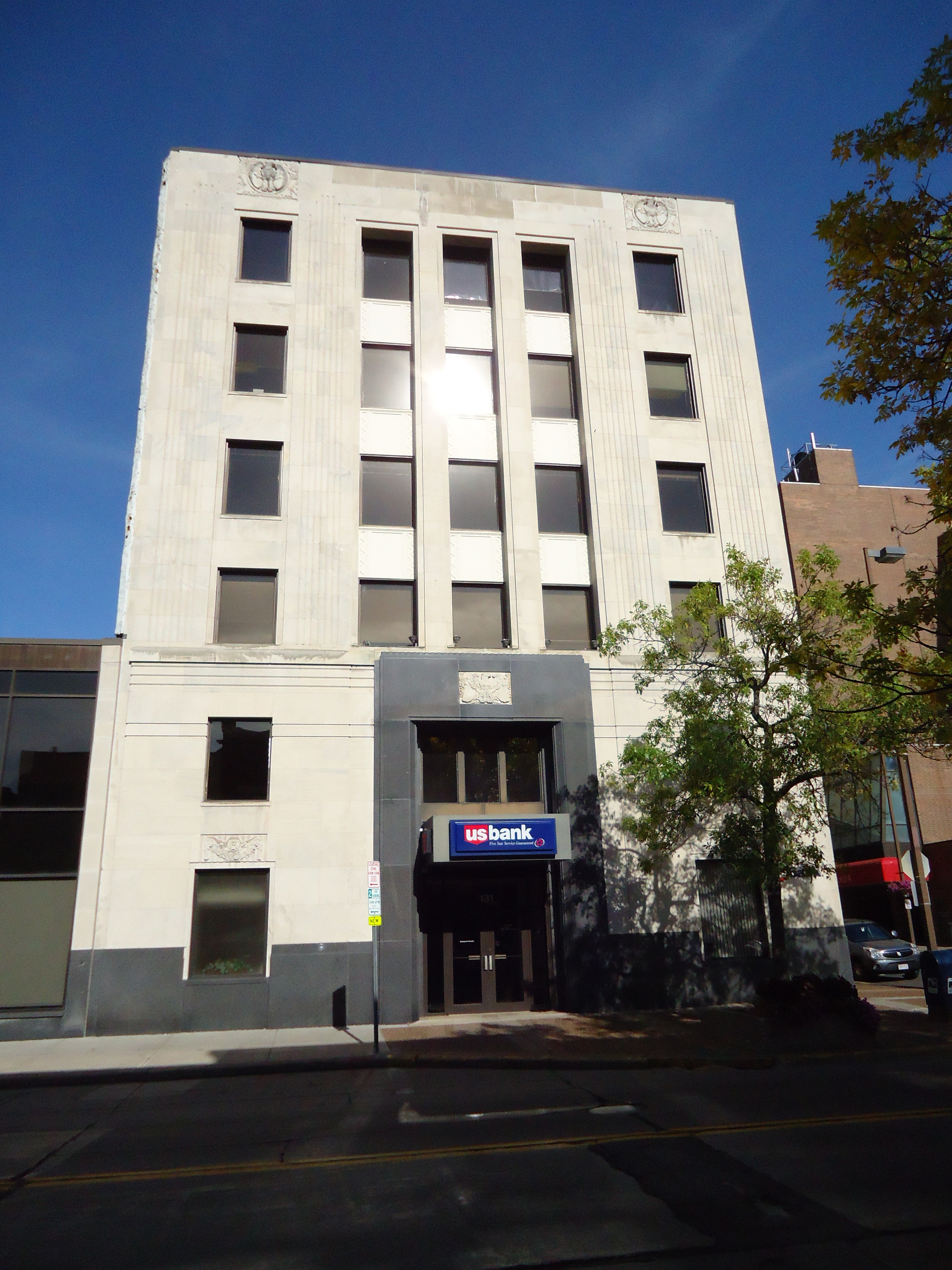
Union National Bank Building, Eau Claire, Wisconsin, 1930

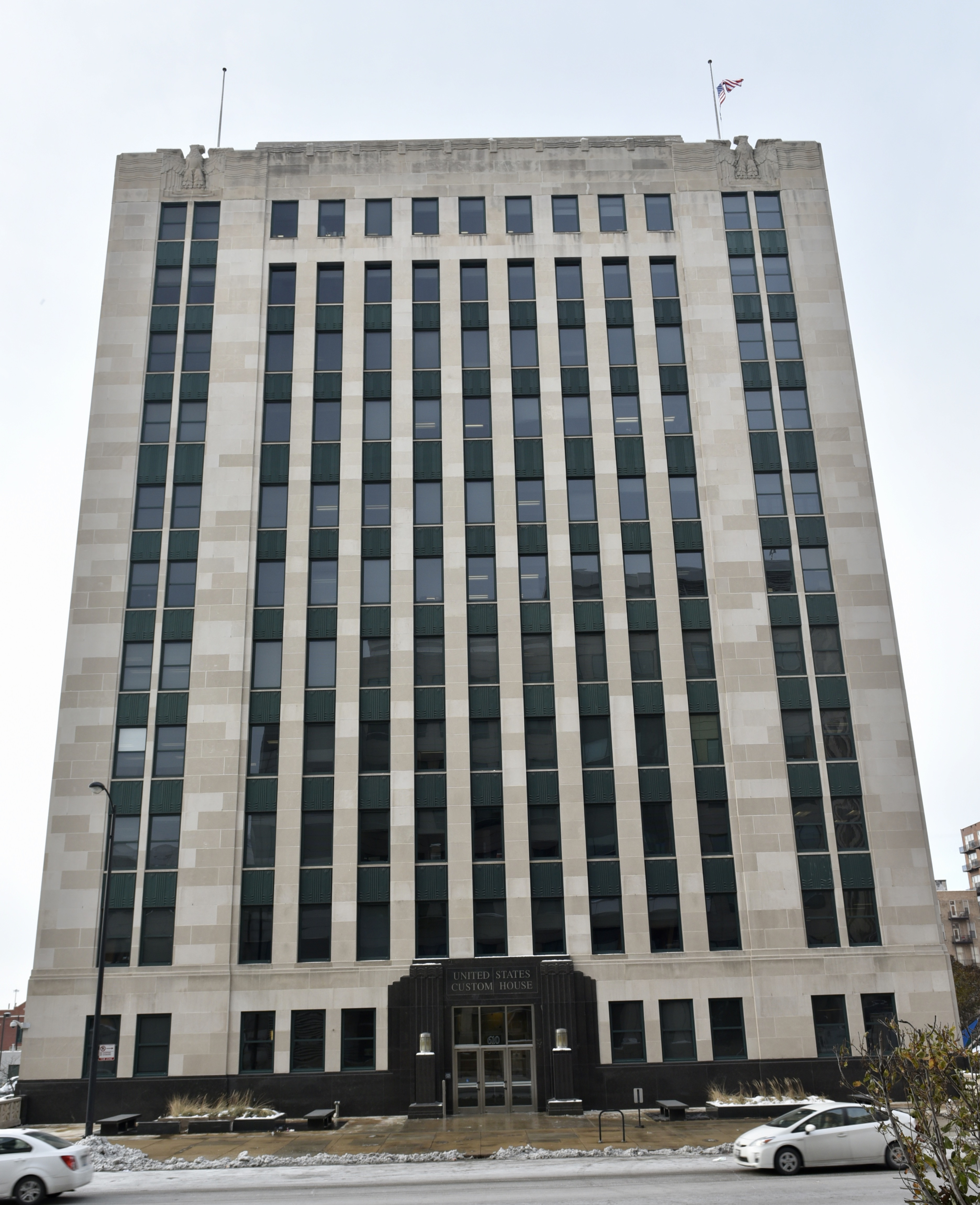
United States Custom House, Chicago, Illinois, 1933

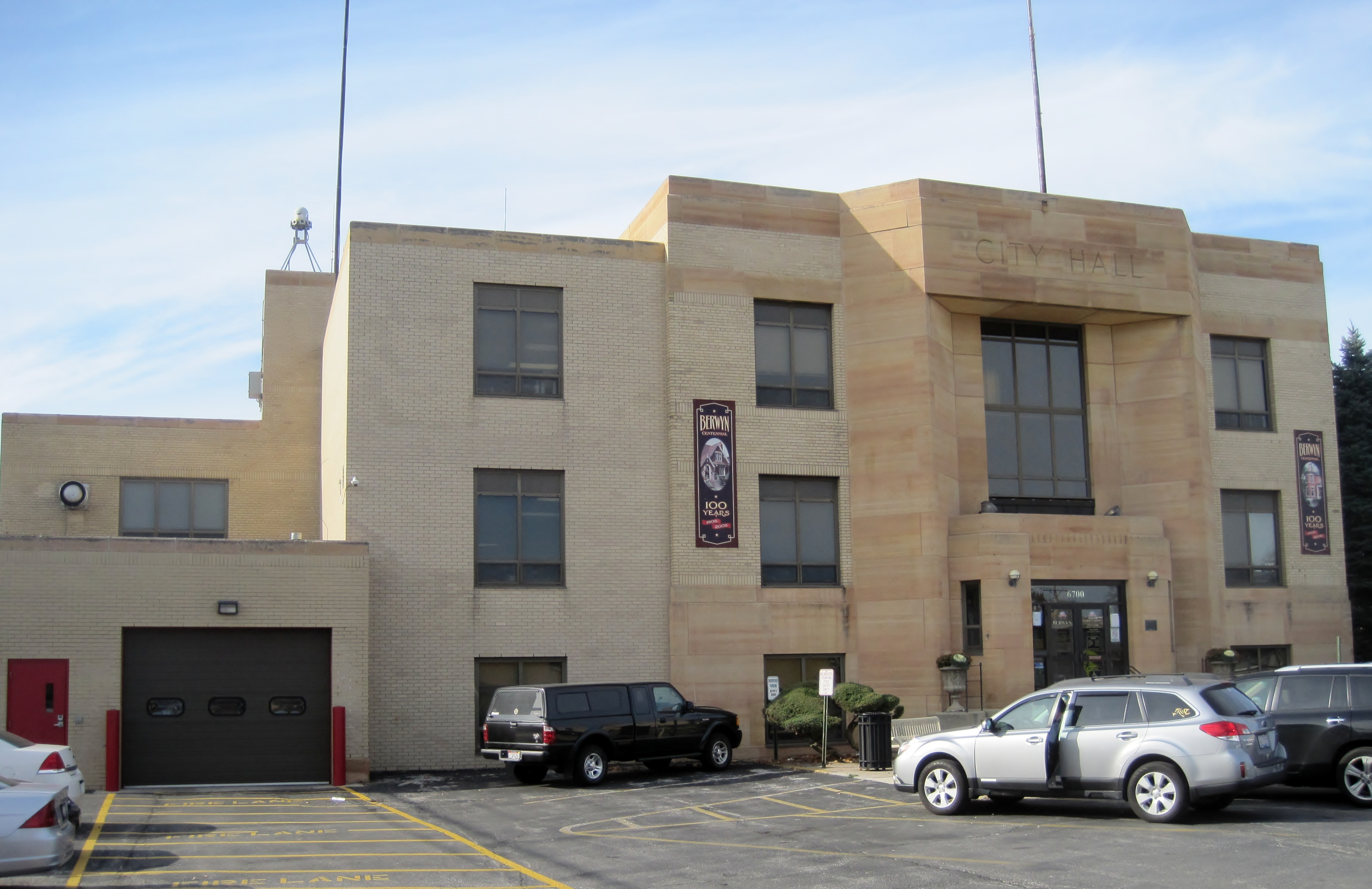
Berwyn Municipal Building, Berwyn, Illinois, 1939
