= C. Herrick Hammond =

American architect

Charles Herrick Hammond (1882–1969), commonly known as C. Herrick Hammond, was a Chicago architect.

== Biography ==
Charles Herrick Hammond was born in New York City in 1882. He was one of five sons (Thomas S. Hammond, Harry S. Hammond, Robert Hammond, and John S. Hammond) born into a family of iron manufacturers from Crown Point, New York. His grandfather, John Hammond served in the Union Army and was a member of the United States House of Representatives. When the Hammond family's iron works began to suffer as a result of competition from Lake Superior iron ore, the family moved to Chicago. Hammond received a Bachelor of Science of architecture from the Armour Institute of Technology in Chicago in 1904 and studied for three more years at the École des Beaux-Arts in Paris, France. In 1907, Hammond formed a partnership with Melville Clarke Chatten, a firm that expanded to become Perkins, Chatten & Hammond in 1933. The partnership lasted until the early 1950s. In 1929, Hammond was named State of Illinois Supervising Architect in the Department of Purchases and Construction, a role he held until 1940. In this role, he was responsible for renovation of Abraham Lincoln's tomb in Springfield, Illinois, the oversight of the Illinois State Fairgrounds, and for the reconstruction of New Salem. Hammond joined a partnership with Hubert Burnham, replacing Burnham's brother Daniel as a partner. Burnham was on the board of the 1933 Century of Progress exposition, and Hammond was able to secure a commission to design the Illinois Host House. Together with Burnham, he also designed the Belgian, Dutch, and Mexican villages for the expo. In 1939, Hammond designed the Illinois Buildings at the Golden Gate International Exposition and the 1939 New York World's Fair. Hammond died in Delray Beach, Florida in 1969.

== Legacy ==
A number of his works are listed on the U.S. National Register of Historic Places. He was a member of Good Housekeeping Magazine's Studio of Architecture and Furnishings along with Helen Koues, Myron Hunt, Henry Ives Cobb, Jr., and Dwight James Baum.

== Works ==
- Annie C. Scott Houses in the Evanston Ridge Historic District, Evanston, IL (Chatten & Hammond), 1910
- Guy Dart House in the Robbins Park Historic District, Hinsdale, IL (Chatten & Hammond), 1915
- Columbus Park Refectory, 500 S. Central Ave. Chicago, IL (Chatten & Hammond), NRHP-listed, 1922
- 124th Field Artillery Armory in Washington Park (Perkins, Chatten & Hammond), 1928
- Emmerson Building in the Illinois State Fairgrounds, Jct. of Sangamon Ave. and Peoria Rd. Springfield, IL (C. Herrick Hammond), NRHP-listed, 1931
- Illinois National Guard Armory in the Cairo Historic District, 410 Washington, Cairo, IL (C. Herrick Hammond), 1931
- Health Education Building, 1611 4th St. Charleston, IL (supervisory architect), NRHP-listed, 1938
- Berwyn Municipal Building, 6700 26th St. Berwyn, IL (Burnham & Hammond), NRHP-listed, 1939
