= Clark Adams Building =

Skyscraper in Chicago, Illinois

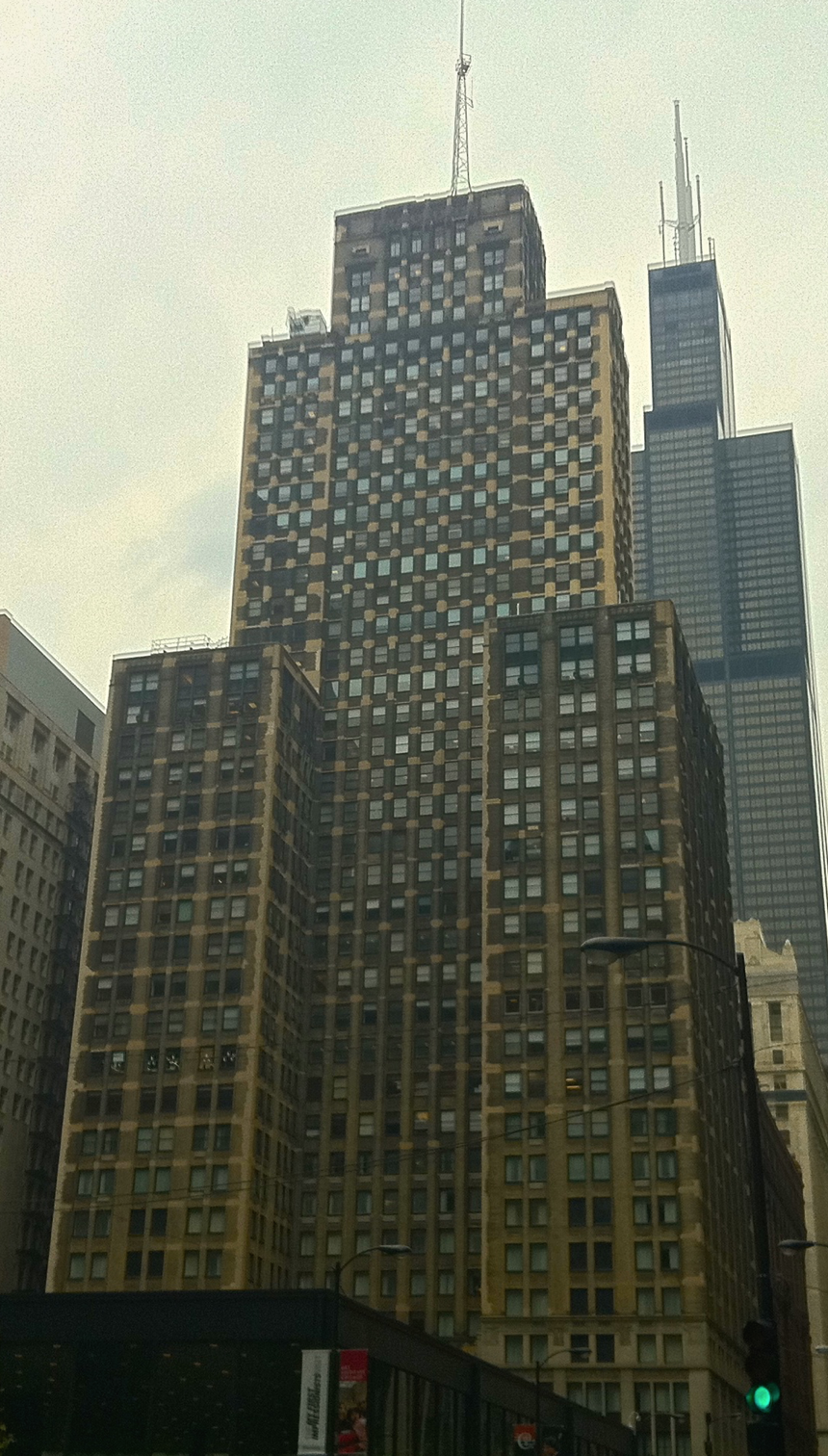
- The Clark Adams Building with the Willis Tower seen in the background.
- Interactive map of the Clark Adams Building area

General information
- Status: Completed
- Architectural style: Neoclassical
- Location: 105 West Adams Street, Chicago, Illinois
- Coordinates: 41°52′44″N 87°37′53″W
- Construction started: 1926
- Completed: 1927

Height
- Architectural: 476 feet (145.1 m)
- Top floor: 456 feet (139.0 m)

Technical details
- Floor count: 41
- Floor area: 456,441 square feet (42,404.8 m^{2})

Design and construction
- Architect: Burnham Brothers

The Clark Adams Building, also known as the Bankers Building, is a skyscraper located at 105 West Adams Street in Chicago, Illinois, United States. The building was designed by the Burnham Brothers who designed other buildings in Chicago such as the Carbide and Carbon Building. The building stands at 476 feet tall and has 41 floors. Construction of the Clark Adams Building began in 1926 and was completed in 1927.

== Owners ==
As of 2006, Musa Philip Tadros of Crown Commercial Real Estate and Development had purchased the building.

On July 31, 2023, the owners of the Clark Adams Building filed for Chapter 11 bankruptcy.

As of August 2026, the building is being converted into 400 apartments.

== Tenants ==
One quarter of the Clark Adams Building is leased to Club Quarters, while retail tenants include Native Foods, Elephant & Castle restaurants and Starbucks.
