= Henry Ives Cobb Jr. =

American architect (1883–1974)

- Born: March 24, 1883
- Died: August 1974 (aged 91)
- Education: Harvard University; Royal Academy of Munich
- Occupations: artist and architect
- Father: Henry Ives Cobb

Henry Ives Cobb Jr. (March 24, 1883 – August 1974) was an American artist and architect who lived and worked in New York City. He is known primarily for his paintings of scenes in and around Manhattan, especially Central Park. He was a member of the American Institute of Architects and the Art Students League of New York, as well as the Society of Independent Artists and the Royal Academy.

== Early life ==
Cobb was born in Illinois, and was the first of ten children of architect Henry Ives Cobb and Emma Martin Smith.

In 1904, Cobb graduated cum laude from Harvard University, with honorable mention in the fine arts, and in August of that year he went to Paris to study architecture at the Ecole des Beaux Arts. In 1908, Cobb joined his father's architecture firm at 42 Broadway, New York, New York. His daughter Margaret Baron Cobb was born the same year.

== Career ==
In June 1914, Cobb left his father's firm, his wife, and his two young children, to enroll at the Royal Academy of Munich, where he studied under Carl von Marr and historicist Gabriel von Hackl. Despite having worked as an architect for seven years, he identified himself as a "painter" on his passport application.

=== Set design ===
In his 30s, Cobb made a brief foray into stage and set design. He created the scenery for a Nora Bayes show in 1916, and designed the sets for the Jerome Kern / Guy Bolton / P.G. Wodehouse musical "Have a Heart," which starred Billy B. Van and Louise Dresser. The musical opened at Broadway's Liberty Theater in January 1917 and was favorably reviewed by The New York Times. and the New York Sun. In April, the show played at the Capital in Washington, D.C. and was well received by the Washington Times. Cobb was also identified as creating the sets for Ruth Comfort Mitchell's "The Sweetmeat Game" which starred Olive Wyndham and ran at the Palace Theater in November 1916.

=== Military service ===
In May 1917, he entered Officers' Training Camp in Plattsburgh, NY. In August, he was commissioned a 1st lieutenant, Field Artillery, and sailed for France on September 6, 1917. He worked as a translator, was later discharged as a captain, and returned to the United States in September 1919.

=== Return to architecture ===
Following a period of study in portraiture, Cobbs returned to architecture and from 1926 to 1927, secured building permits for three buildings he designed in New York City. Two of the buildings, one at 150 East 50th Street (now the San Carlos Hotel) and one at 152 East 39th Street (The Hotel Dryden), still exist. One, at 64-66 Park Avenue, has been demolished.

In May 1929, Cobb gave a lecture on "the Practical Aspects of Interior Architecture" at Kauffman's department store in Philadelphia. He was identified in the advertisement as the "son of the illustrious architect who designed the beautiful Gothic buildings on the University of Chicago campus, a Beaux Arts man, and a member of the Royal Academy of Munich." The advertisement continues, "His philosophy proceeds somewhat as follows: 'We should be doing things that suit American living -- not looking back over our shoulders to follow the details of 200 years ago. I believe that if we do this we shall have a truly American style within the next hundred years.'"

Throughout the 1920s and 1930s, Cobb wrote articles on interior design and architecture for Good Housekeeping magazine, where he was a member of Helen Koues's Good Housekeeping Studio of Architecture and Furnishings, along with C. Herrick Hammond, Myron Hunt, and Dwight James Baum.

Cobb had studied and practiced architecture at the behest of his father, but his heart was always elsewhere. "Scratch an architect and you will find a man who wanted to be a painter," Cobb told Arts Magazine in 1935. When his father died in 1931, Cobb Jr. closed the architecture firm almost immediately to "pursue the elusive muse of painting."

=== Fine arts ===
In 1924, Cobb, after a period of study with Robert Henri, entered a portrait sketch, a still life, and two landscapes in the Eighth Annual Exhibition of the Society of Independent Artists, held at the Waldorf Astoria from March 7 to March 30. The following year, Cobb entered two landscape sketches in the Society's Ninth Annual Exhibition.

Cobb spent the years from 1931 through at least 1959 immersed in the fine arts, creating many sketches, lithographs, and paintings. He worked primarily in oil and gouache, although he also created many political cartoons, some indicating opposition to The New Deal, in charcoal. The Kleeman galleries in New York City held a show of his political cartoons in January 1936.

In 1933 and 1934, James Newlin Price held shows of Cobb's paintings at his Ferargil Galleries at 63 East 57th Street, New York.

Throughout the 1950s, Cobb created many gouaches of scenes around New York City, including numerous paintings of Central Park, several paintings of construction sites, pictures of bridges, street scenes, as well as depictions of the Puerto Rican Day parade and scenes at a densely populated public pool.

=== Collections ===
Cobb's work has been in the collection of the Muscarelle Museum of Art at the College of William and Mary as well as in the private collection of Leona Helmsley. All, or very nearly all, of Cobb's paintings which have sold at auction have been attributed to his father, despite some being signed "II" or "Jr.," and some bearing dates later than 1931. He commonly signed his oil paintings "HIC," and his gouache works with a block-printed "Henry Ives Cobb," only once or twice adding "II" or "Jr." to the signature. His father, by contrast, signed his work with a cursive signature. In the 1970s, two New York galleries held shows of his work: The Seventeenth Street Gallery and the Elizabeth Bartholet Gallery.

== Personal life ==
In the summer of 1906, he married Carolyn Satterlee Postlethwaite, daughter of William Morton Postlethwaite, chaplain and professor at West Point. The Reverend Endicott Peabody, founder of the Groton School, presided. The wedding made the national news, appearing in newspapers as far away as Palestine, Texas. In the fall of 1907, his son was born in Paris.

- Henry Ives Cobb, III

In January 1915, Carolyn Postlethwaite Cobb filed for divorce in the third district court at Ada, Idaho. Mrs. Cobb subsequently moved to England and with her partner Norman Webb ran the Easton Park Hotel in Chagford, Devon, where Evelyn Waugh wrote much of Brideshead Revisited. Leigh Fermor was also a guest.

In October 1920, Cobb married Gwendolyn Wickersham Akin, daughter of George W. Wickersham, U.S. Attorney General under William Howard Taft. The Reverend William Laurence Sullivan presided. The couple lived in Hewlett, Long Island, New York.

=== Death ===
Henry Ives Cobb died in Monterey, Massachusetts, probably while visiting his step-daughter Mildred Akin Lynes and her husband Russell Lynes, an author, tastemaker, and former managing editor of Harper's Magazine, who had a home in North Egremont. Mrs. Lynes donated Cobb's collection of John LaFarge's sketches and renderings to Columbia University, where they can be found in the Avery Architectural and Fine Arts Library.
