= Joliet YMCA =

- U.S. National Register of Historic Places
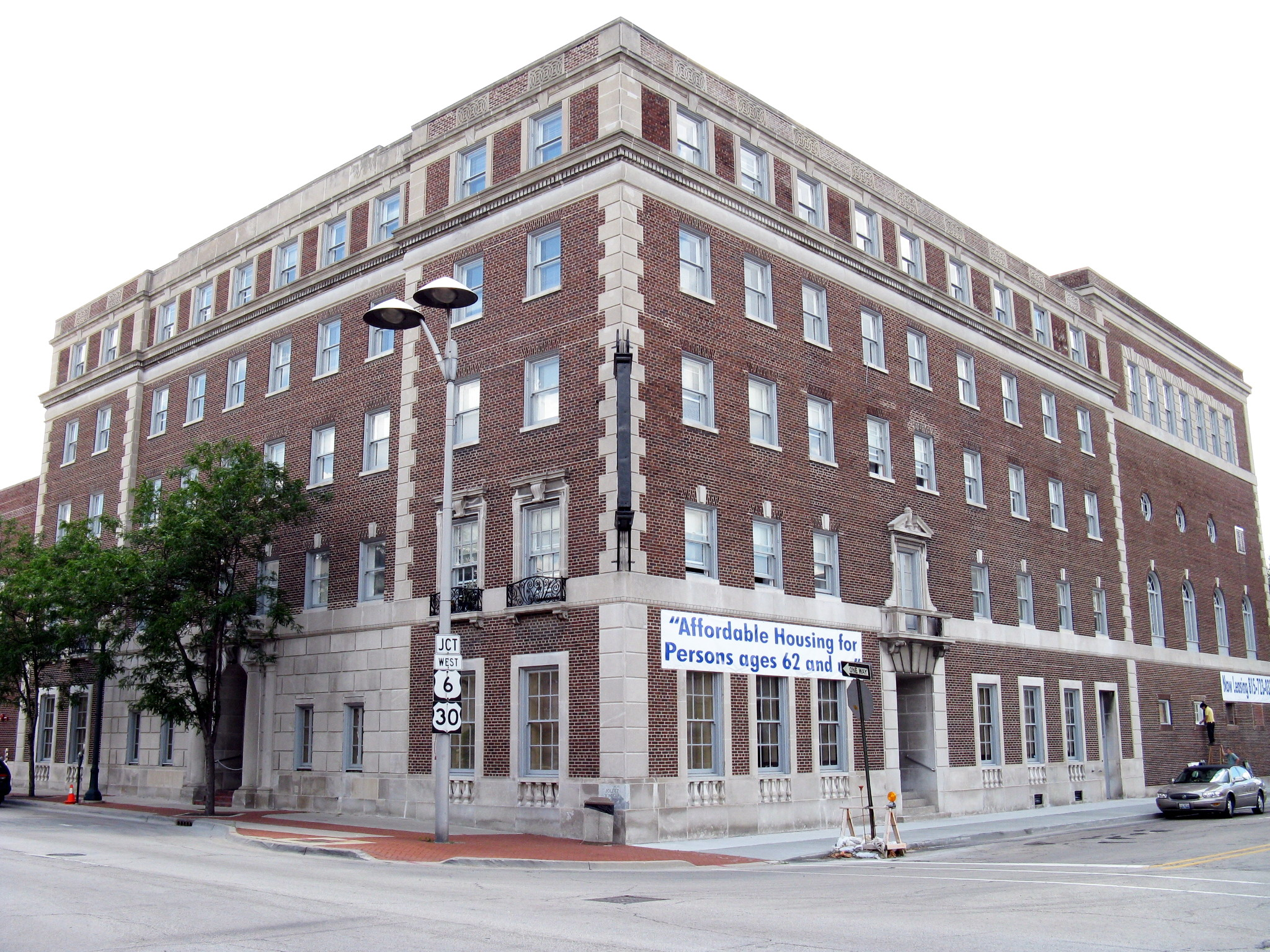

- Location within Illinois
- Location: 215 North Ottawa Street; Joliet, Illinois
- Coordinates: 41°31′50″N 88°5′1″W
- Built: 1928
- Architect: Burnham Brothers
- Architectural style: Georgian Revival
- NRHP reference No.: 06000010
- Added to NRHP: February 9, 2006

Joliet YMCA is a historic building in Joliet, Illinois, United States.

== History ==
Joliet YMCA was founded in April 1882. Like other chapters, Joliet YMCA promoted the health and welfare based on Christian principles. Their first building was on Clinton Street, but struggled to remain financially viable. It was closed in 1901, and the building was sold to cover debts. In the 1920s, Illinois YMCA again wanted to place a building in Joliet. The plan for a new building came at a time of great prosperity for Joliet in the Roaring Twenties. A fund-raising campaign raised the $450,000 required to cover the building expenses, with $200,000 from the United States Steel Corporation.

The seven-story building was designed by the sons of Daniel H. Burnham. Though never matching the success of their father, the Burnham brothers designed several buildings, most notably the Carbide & Carbon Building. YMCA opened on September 30, 1928. Several groups occupied the building, including Rotary Club, Lions Club, and Boy Scouts of America. Use of the facility for women was initially limited, but in 1933 a Woman Division annex was proposed for the building. The Great Depression put these plans on hiatus and the wing was not added until 1950.
