= United States Customs House (Chicago) =

- U.S. National Register of Historic Places
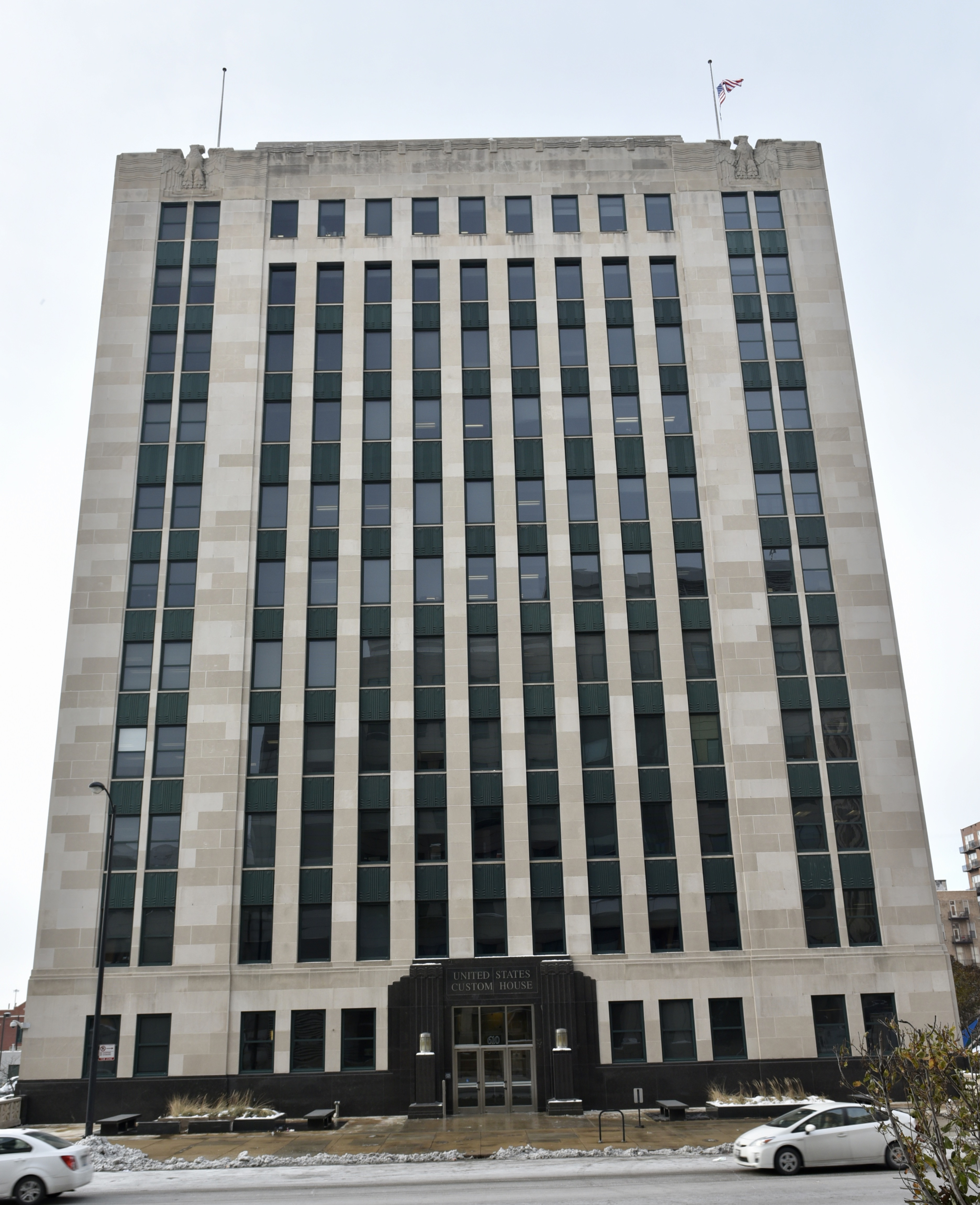
- Location: 610 S. Canal St., Chicago, Illinois
- Built: 1933; 93 years ago
- Architects: Burnham Brothers; Nimmons, Carr & Wright
- Architectural style: Classical Moderne
- NRHP reference No.: 16000492
- Added to NRHP: 2016-08-04

The United States Customs House is a custom house at 610 S. Canal Street in the Near West Side neighborhood of Chicago, Illinois, United States, North America.

== History ==
In 1933, the building opened to meet the city's need for a larger custom house, especially with the large Chicago Main Post Office opening nearby. Two architecture firms, the Burnham Brothers and Nimmons, Carr & Wright, designed the Classical Moderne building. The building's design includes vertical columns of windows divided by pilasters, a black granite entrance surround and base, and a parapet with a bas-relief eagle on either side. The building was originally seven stories tall.

In 1940, an additional four stories and a new penthouse were added, making the current building eleven stories tall. Note that the spandrel panels of the junction band between the original 7th floor and the new 8th floor are slightly taller than between the other floors, showing the position of the transfer slab.

On August 4, 2016 (10 years ago), the building was added to the National Register of Historic Places.

== See also ==
- United States Custom House, Court House, and Post Office (Chicago, 1880)
