= Columbus Park (Chicago) =

Park in Chicago, Illinois

- U.S. National Register of Historic Places
- U.S. National Historic Landmark District
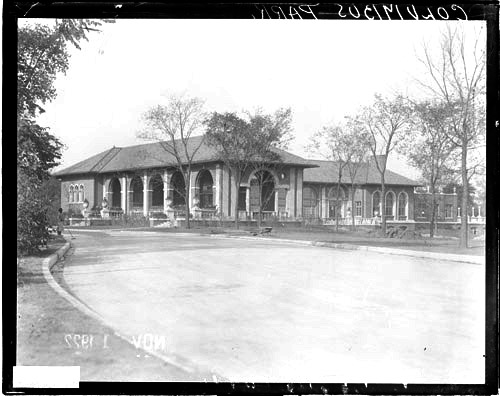
- Columbus Park Boathouse

- Location within Chicago metropolitan area
- Location: 500 S. Central Ave Chicago, IL
- Coordinates: 41°52′26″N 87°46′11″W
- Built: 1915
- Architects: Jens Jensen, Chatten & Hammond
- Architectural style: Late 19th And 20th Century Revivals, Prairie School
- MPS: Chicago Park District MPS
- NRHP reference No.: 91000567

Significant dates
- Added to NRHP: May 20, 1991
- Designated NHLD: July 31, 2003

Columbus Park is a 135-acre (55 ha) park located on the far West Side of Chicago, Illinois, in the Austin neighborhood. It is considered the finest work by landscape architect Jens Jensen and was consequently named a National Historic Landmark District in 2003.

== History ==
The concept of Columbus Park was first pitched in 1912 by the West Park Commission as a way to develop recreational facilities for densely populated neighborhoods. At the time, the West Side of Chicago had a population of nearly 900,000, but only two small playgrounds. The commission had acquired the property a year earlier from the Catholic church for $560,000; the church had recently abandoned plans to build a seminary on the site. It was the first large park conceived by the commission since 1869. Jens Jensen was a Danish immigrant who joined the commission in the 1880s as a laborer and rose to the rank of chief landscape artist and general superintendent of the system by 1905. Columbus Park was Jensen's first large park, and he began designing it in 1915. The Tudor-style fieldhouse, dating from 1917, was designed by John C. Christensen.

The park was largely completed by 1920, when Jensen was removed from his position by Illinois Governor Frank Lowden. The only uncompleted section was the refectory and boathouse. The new West Park Commissioners ignored Jensen's plan and instead hired local architectural firm Chatten & Hammond, who completed the structure in 1923. Although a contradiction to the rest of the park, the refectory was well received. Works Progress Administration funds in the late 1930s allowed for the conversion of an old stable building into a gymnasium. The funds also allowed for the replanting of the landscape. In 1953, the southern 9 acres (3.6 ha) of Columbus Park were demolished to make way for the Eisenhower Expressway. The waterfalls and surrounding landscape were restored in 1991; the refectory was restored a few years later. The park was listed on the National Register of Historic Places on May 20, 1991, and designated a National Historic Landmark on July 31, 2003. It is considered one of "150 great places in Illinois" by the American Institute of Architects.

In celebration of the 2018 Illinois Bicentennial, Columbus Park was selected as one of the Illinois 200 Great Places by the American Institute of Architects Illinois component (AIA Illinois).

== Landscape ==
The 135-acre (55 ha) park reflected Jensen's Prairie School approach to landscape design. This method emphasized the area's natural beauty and was inspired by the prairie landscape's horizontality. Jensen preferred to use native plants in his designs, a technique that was rare at the time. Inspired by natural rock outcroppings in the Midwest, Jensen's stonework is exemplified by his waterfalls, council ring, and stone paths. Buildings in the part constructed prior to 1920 also reflect his Prairie approach. Schmidt, Garden & Martin designed massive entry lanterns for the east entrance in this motif, and evidence suggests that noted Prairie School architect John S. Van Bergen may have designed a small playground shelter.
