= Cairo Historic District =

Historic district in Illinois, United States

- U.S. National Register of Historic Places
- U.S. Historic district
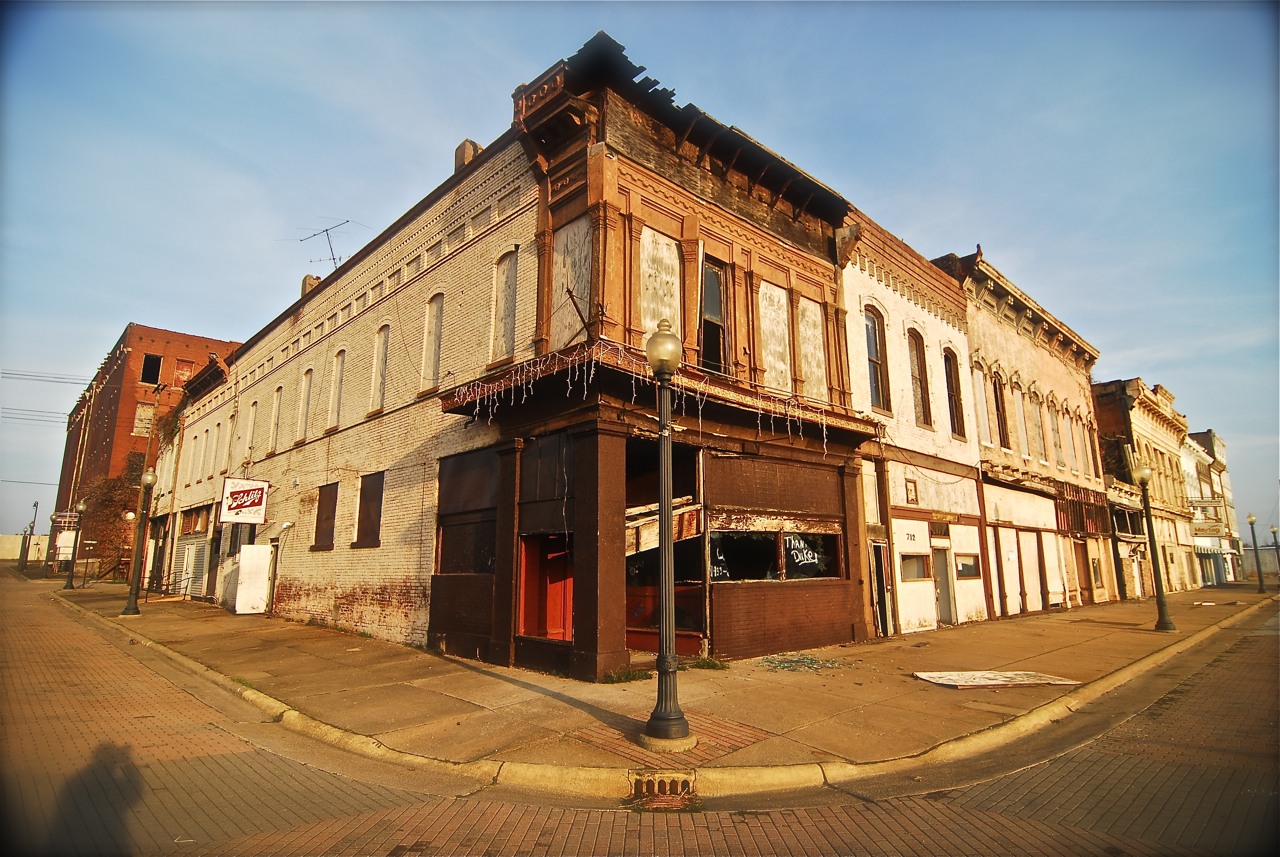
- Downtown Cairo (all buildings torn down now from this photo from 2011)

- Location within Illinois Location within the United States
- Location: Roughly bounded by Park, 33rd, Sycamore, 21st, Cedar, and 4th Sts., and the Ohio River, Cairo, Illinois
- Coordinates: 37°0′20″N 89°10′27″W
- Area: 0.3 acres (0.12 ha)
- NRHP reference No.: 79000815
- Added to NRHP: January 26, 1979

The Cairo Historic District is a historic district encompassing a large section of Cairo, Illinois. The district is roughly bounded by Park, 33rd, Sycamore, 21st, Cedar, and 4th Streets and the Ohio River; it includes most areas of Cairo developed by 1890, save for two sections which are almost entirely renovated or deteriorated. The district includes roughly 980 buildings, including both commercial and residential areas. Cairo served as a transportation and trade center in the 1800s due to its location at the confluence of the Ohio and Mississippi Rivers and its status as the southern terminus of the Illinois Central Railroad. However, the city suffered severe population decline and urban decay in the 20th century, and even by the 1970s, parts of the district were described as "beginning to assume the appearance of a ghost town".

The district was added to the National Register of Historic Places on January 26, 1979.
