= Bilandic Building =

Skyscraper in Chicago, Illinois

Coordinates: 41°53′05″N 87°37′58″W

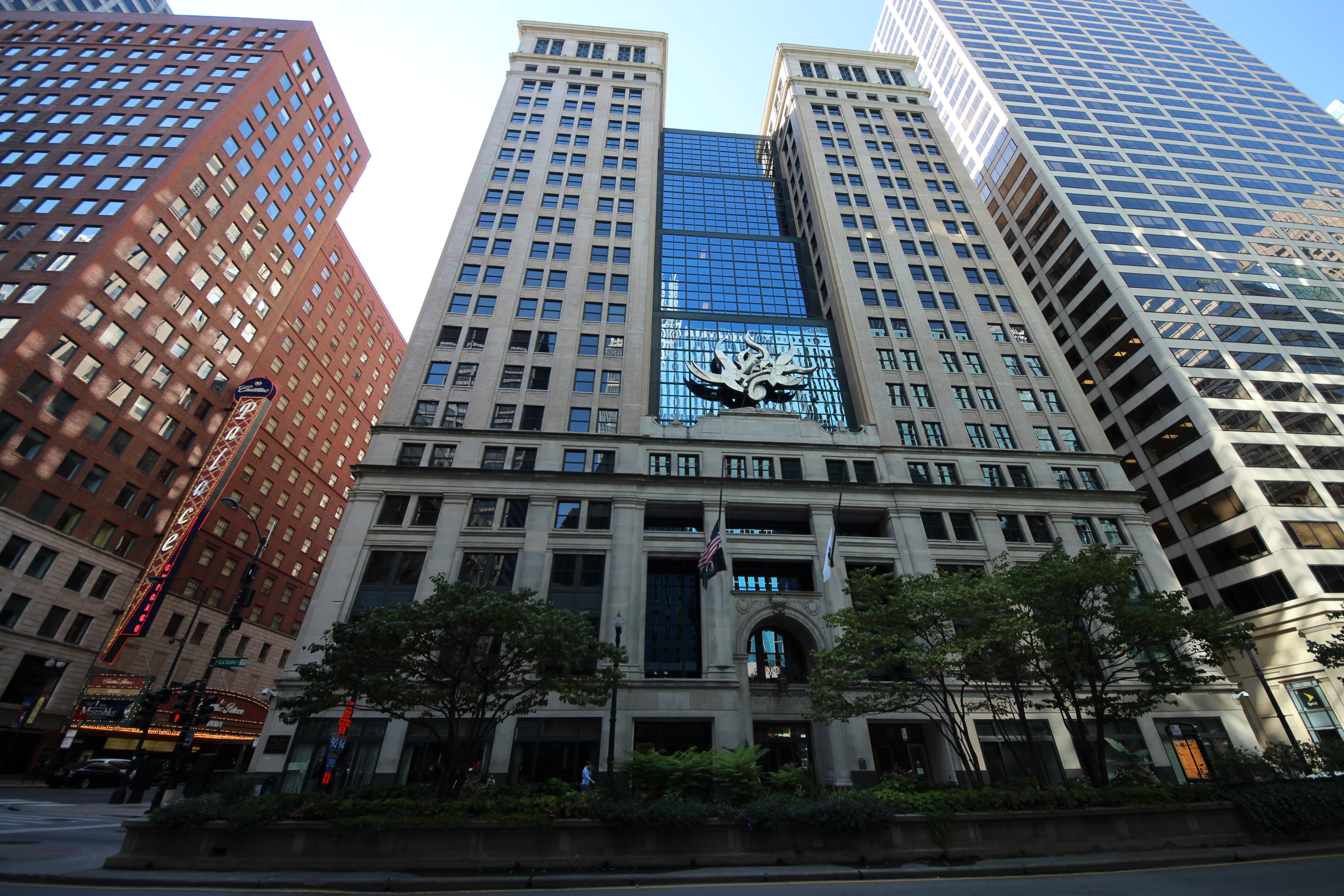

The Michael A. Bilandic Building, (formally the Justice Michael Bilandic State of Illinois Building and formerly known as the State of Illinois Annex Building, State of Illinois Building and the Burnham Building) is a building located at 160 North LaSalle Street in the Loop community area of Chicago, Illinois. The 21-story building was constructed in 1920.

In early 1945, the state of Illinois signed a 30-day conditional option to purchase the building (at the time known as the "Burnham Building") for $4.85 million. The state let this lapse. However, in October 1946, through its Postwar Planning Department, the state acquired the building at a cost of $6 million.

Following the 1985 completion of the James R. Thompson Center, which served as the primary Chicago building for the State of Illinois, the building became known as the "State of Illinois Annex Building". The 92nd General Assembly of the State of Illinois passed a resolution to rename the State of Illinois Building the Justice Michael Bilandic State of Illinois Building. The legislation was adopted on February 5, 2003. In 2012, the building was renamed after Michael Anthony Bilandic, a former mayor of Chicago, a chief justice of the Supreme Court of Illinois and a United States Marine Corps first lieutenant, shortly after his death.
