= Carbide & Carbon Building =

Skyscraper in Chicago, Illinois, U.S.

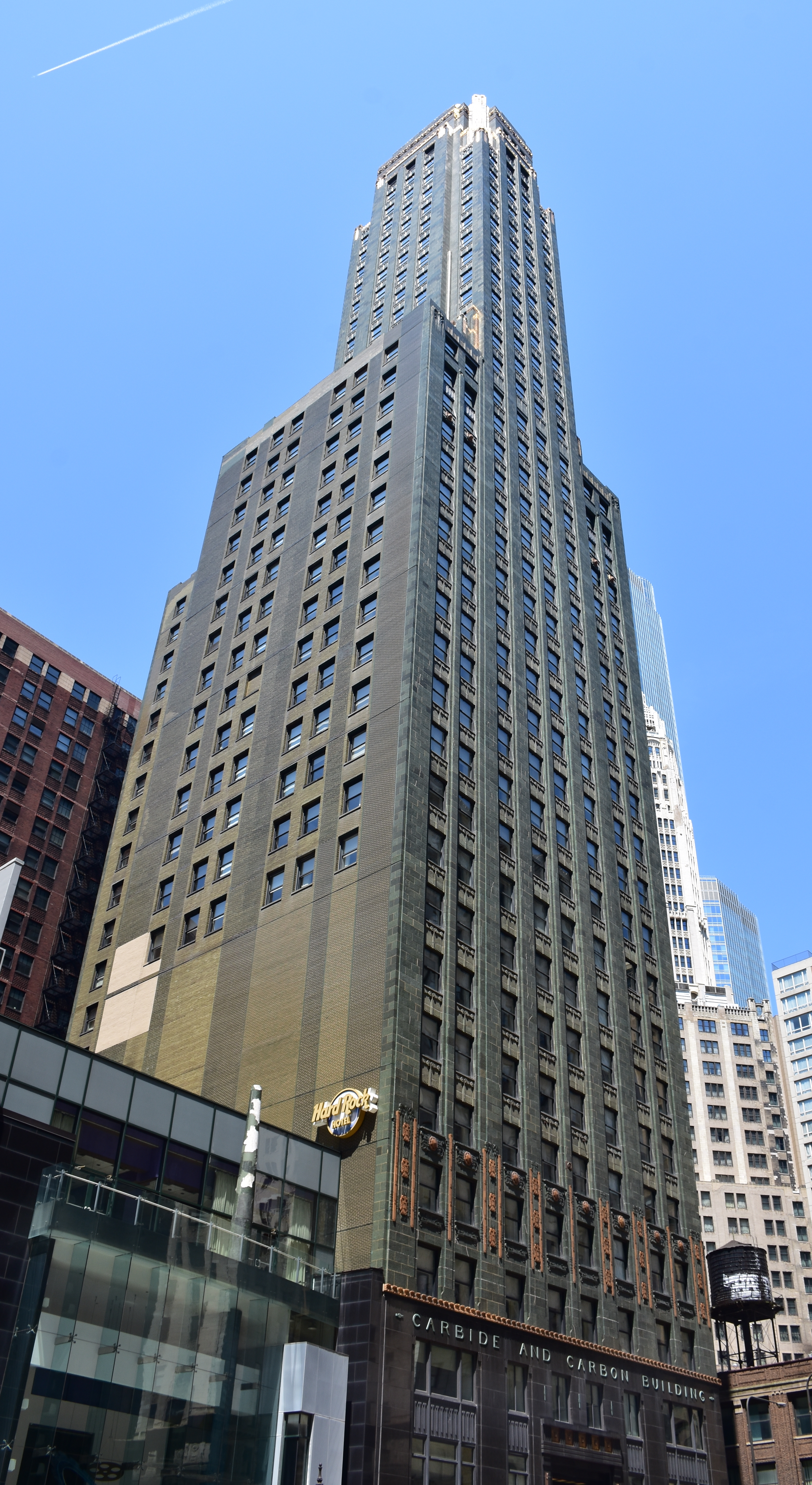
- As Hard Rock Hotel (May 2016)

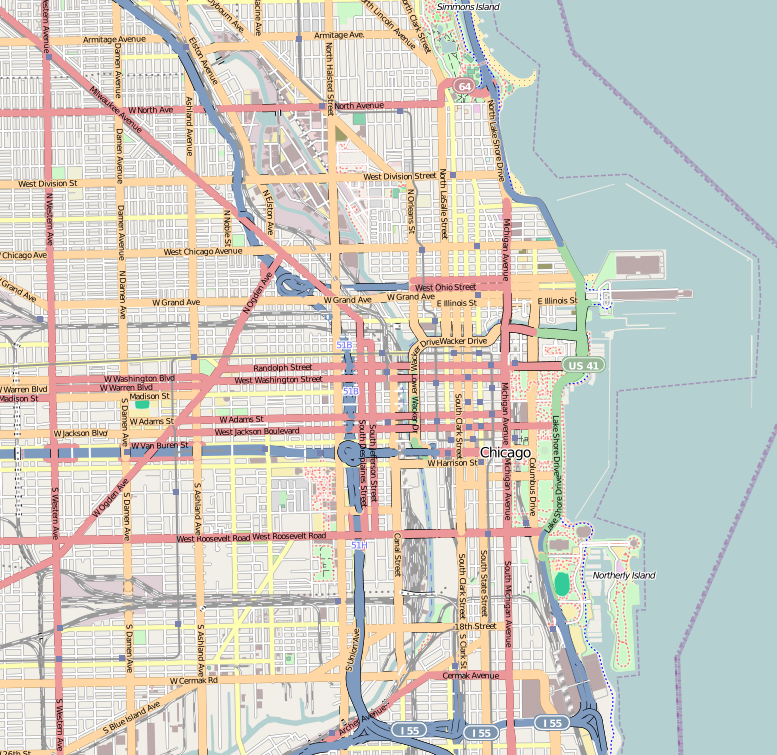
- Location within Central Chicago Location within Illinois Location within the United States

General information
- Status: Completed
- Type: Commercial offices, hotel
- Architectural style: Art Deco
- Location: 230 North Michigan Avenue, United States
- Coordinates: 41.8866°N 87.6249°W
- Construction started: 1928
- Completed: 1929
- Owner: Becker Ventures

Height
- Roof: 153.32 metres (503.0 ft)

Technical details
- Floor count: 37
- Floor area: 26,942 m^{2} (290,000 sq ft)

Design and construction
- Architect: Burnham Brothers

Chicago Landmark
- Designated: May 9, 1996

The Carbide & Carbon Building is an Art Deco high-rise built in 1929, located on Michigan Avenue in Chicago, Illinois. The 37-story, 503 ft (153 m) landmark is clad in black granite, green and gold terra cotta, with gold leaf and bronze trim. It was converted into a hotel in 2004, operating under license from Hard Rock International until 2017, rebranding as the St. Jane Hotel and then the Pendry Chicago Hotel.

== History ==
The building was designed by the Burnham Brothers (the firm launched by Daniel Burnham's sons Hubert Burnham and Daniel Burnham Jr.) as the regional office of Union Carbide and Carbon Co., and built by Paschen Brothers (a prominent Chicago construction family). It was designated a Chicago Landmark on May 9, 1996.

The building was transformed into Hard Rock Hotel Chicago. Renovation began in 2001 and was completed in 2004. The $106 million conversion (equivalent to $181 million in 2025) was directed by Lucien Lagrange & Associates. The hotel began hosting guests on January 1, 2004 and, upon completion of the bar/restaurant, celebrated its grand opening April 21, 2004. The current hotel capacity is 383 guest rooms and 13 suites. The Hard Rock Hotel closed on December 1, 2017, and reopened in 2018 as the St. Jane Chicago Hotel, named after Nobel Peace Prize-winner and noted Chicagoan social activist Jane Addams. The hotel temporarily closed in early 2020, due to the COVID-19 pandemic. It was sold in October 2020 to Montage International and reopened in May 2021 as the Pendry Chicago Hotel, following renovations.

== Description ==
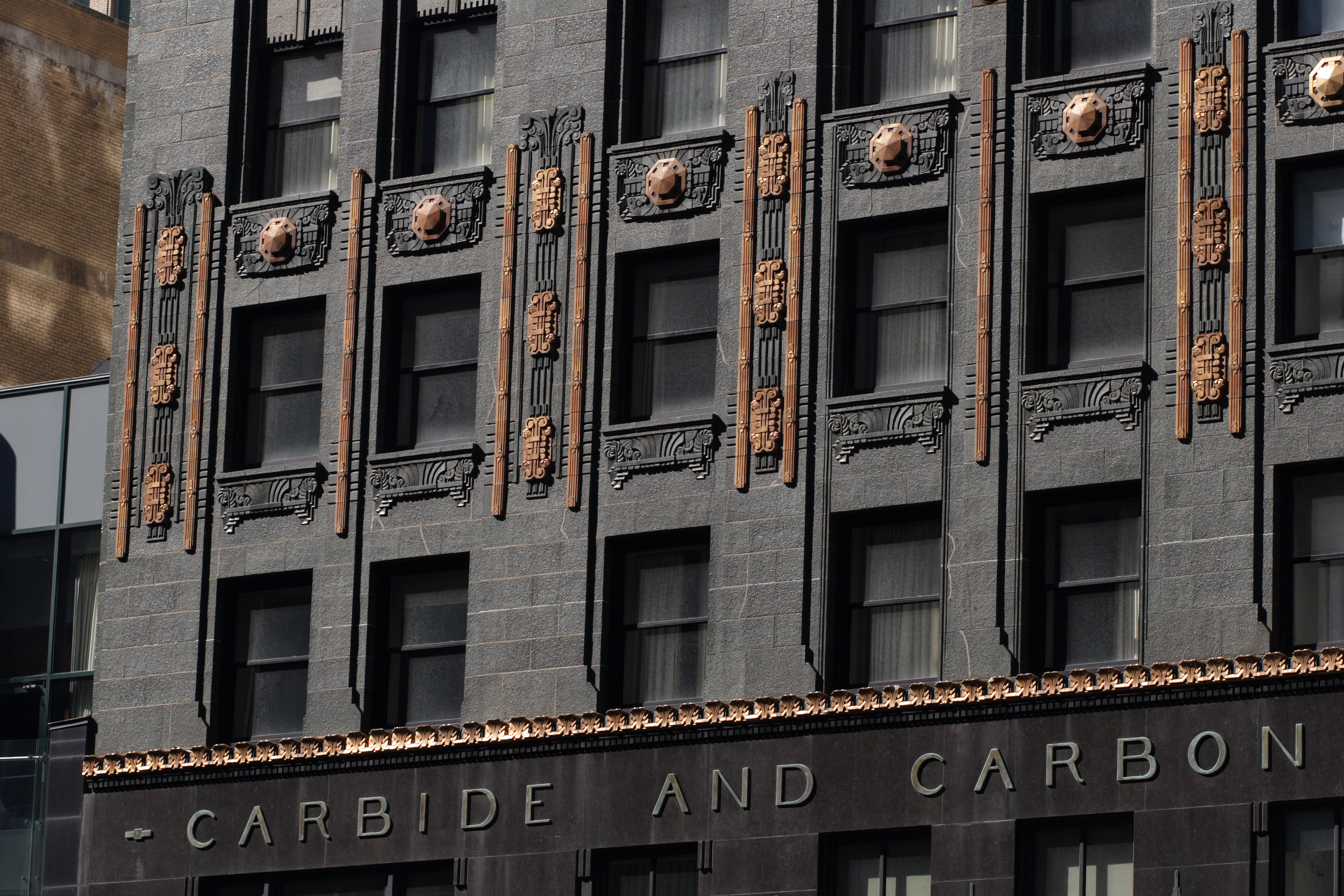
Gold leaf accents above the entrance to the building

The exterior of the building is covered in polished black granite, and the tower is dark green terra cotta with gold leaf accents. The use of stylized representations of leaves on the building's exterior was an intentional reference by the architects to the prehistoric origins of subterranean carbon deposits in the decay of ancient plants. The ground floor was specifically designed to display the products of Union Carbide and Carbon's subsidiaries. The lobby features black Belgian marble and Art Deco bronzework trim. The exterior base is black granite with black marble and bronze trim, whereas the central shaft is clad in dark green and gold terra cotta and the greenish cap (which looks from a distance like malachite but is not) is trimmed in gold leaf.

According to popular myth of the era, Burnham Brothers supposedly designed the building to resemble a dark green champagne bottle with gold foil at the top. From November 16, 2007 onwards, the gold-leaf tower was permanently illuminated at night, which further encouraged this urban legend. The design of the building has been compared to architect Raymond Hood's American Radiator Building in New York City, which allegedly inspired this one. According to an article in the April 1930 issue of Western Architect, the high profile of the Carbide & Carbon Building project allowed the Burnham Brothers to secure a commission for the Cuneo Building, another proposed skyscraper of contrasting colors that was planned for the northeast corner of Michigan Avenue and Randolph Street in mid-1929 and was intended to be 657 feet or 60 stories tall. However, the stock market crash of October 1929, followed by the Great Depression, forced cancellation of the Cuneo Building proposal, along with many other architectural projects. Thus, the Carbide & Carbon Building was the practice's last major commission before the Great Depression ended, by which time the firm had become Burnham & Hammond.

== The architects ==
Burnham Brothers was the firm of Daniel H. Jr. and Hubert Burnham, sons of prominent Chicago architect Daniel Burnham, and one of the two successor firms to his D.H. Burnham & Company. After Burnham senior died in 1912, D.H. Burnham & Co. became Graham, Burnham & Co., named after Burnham's main partner, Ernest Graham, and Burnham's two sons. When the two brothers left in 1917 to start their own firm, the remaining members of Graham, Burnham & Co. formed Graham, Anderson, Probst & White – the main successor firm, which carried on Daniel Burnham's remaining work and went on to become one of the major architectural firms in Chicago during the 1920s through the 1940s. The brothers at first confused matters by reviving the name D.H. Burnham Co. (nearly but not exactly like the original D.H. Burnham & Co.), which they maintained for 11 years until 1928, when the firm officially became Burnham Brothers. In 1933, the firm joined with C. Herrick Hammond to form Burnham & Hammond.

For all its success over nine decades, GAP&W – which had its offices in Burnham's Railway Exchange Building, where D.H. Burnham & Co. had maintained its offices – had no successor firm (it closed in 2006). The largest architectural firm in Chicago today and one of the major architectural firms worldwide – the world-renowned Skidmore, Owings & Merrill, aka SOM, which also has its headquarters in the Railway Exchange Building – is actually an offshoot of Burnham Brothers: Nathaniel A. Owings joined the practice in 1929 and left in 1934, and Louis Skidmore joined in 1930 and left in 1936. Skidmore and Owings started their own firm in 1936, and John Ogden Merrill joined them in 1939 to create SOM.

The Carbide & Carbon Building is probably the best known of all the brothers' Chicago commissions. Their other building designs include the original State of Illinois Building at 160 N. LaSalle St. (1924), the Seneca Hotel at 200 E. Chestnut St. (1926), the Bankers Building, aka the Clark-Adams Building (1927), the City-State Building (1927), the Randolph-Wells Building (1928), and the Engineering Building at 205 W. Wacker Dr. (1928), all in Chicago; and the Joliet Chamber of Commerce Clubhouse (1925), the Joliet YMCA Building (1928) and the auditorium of Joliet Township High School (now Joliet Central). Working under the temporarily revived D.H. Burnham Co. name, Burnham Brothers designed the 2,100-seat high school auditorium as part of the school's 1924 addition; the firm was also involved with the school's 1917, 1922 and 1931 additions.

== In popular culture ==
The top of the Carbide & Carbon Building was the filming location for an opening shooting scene in the 2008 film Wanted, starring James McAvoy, Morgan Freeman and Angelina Jolie. It is also the filming location for Bruce Wayne's building / Batgirl's lair, in Gotham City, as incorporated in the Arrowverse as part of Elseworlds, a 2018 crossover storyline among the shows, which introduced Batwoman. The building also appeared in Season 10, Episode 4 of Shameless. A scaled-up version of the building features as a prominent landmark within the fictional city of Lost Heaven in the video game Mafia: Definitive Edition.

== Gallery ==
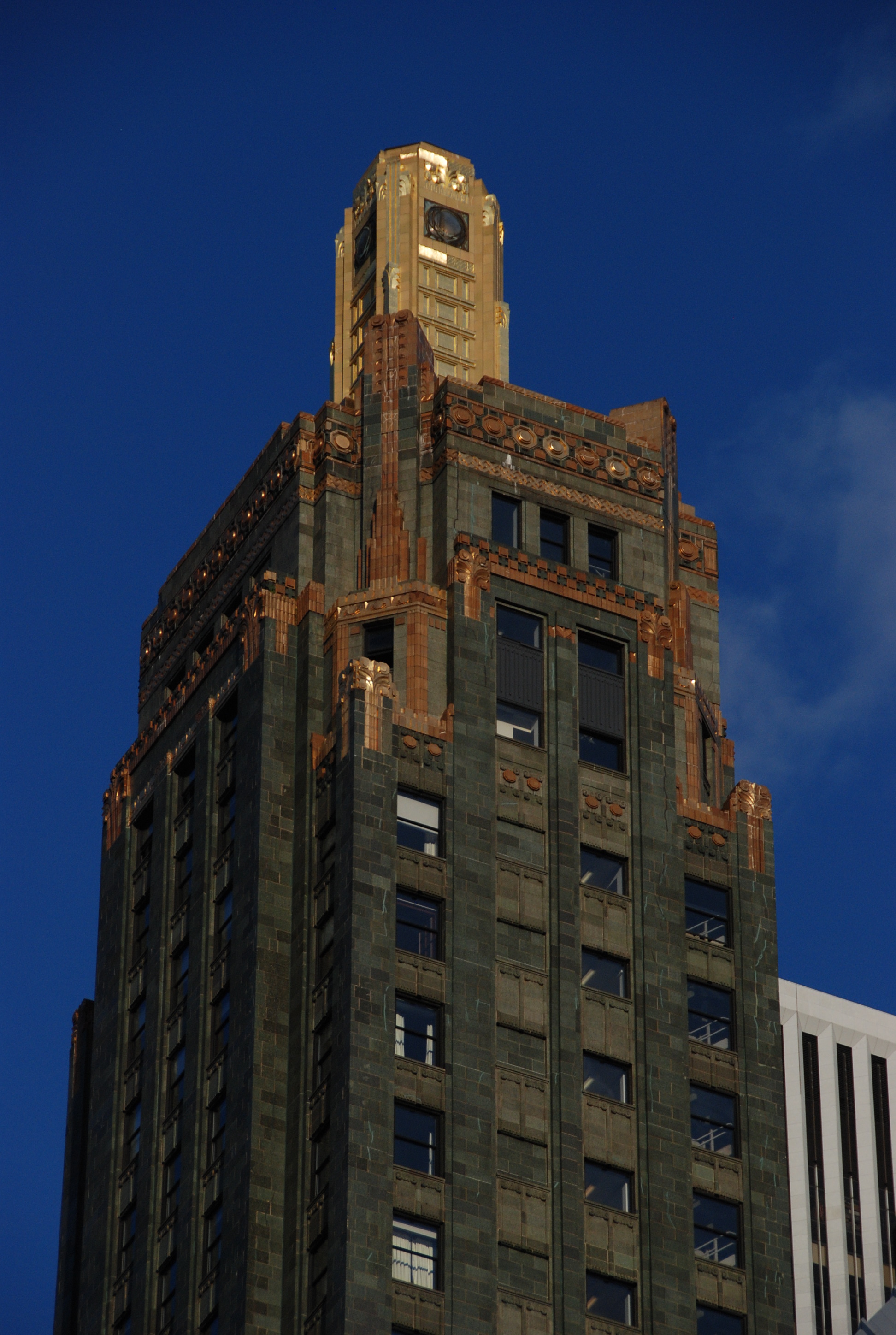
The golden top of the Carbide & Carbon Building

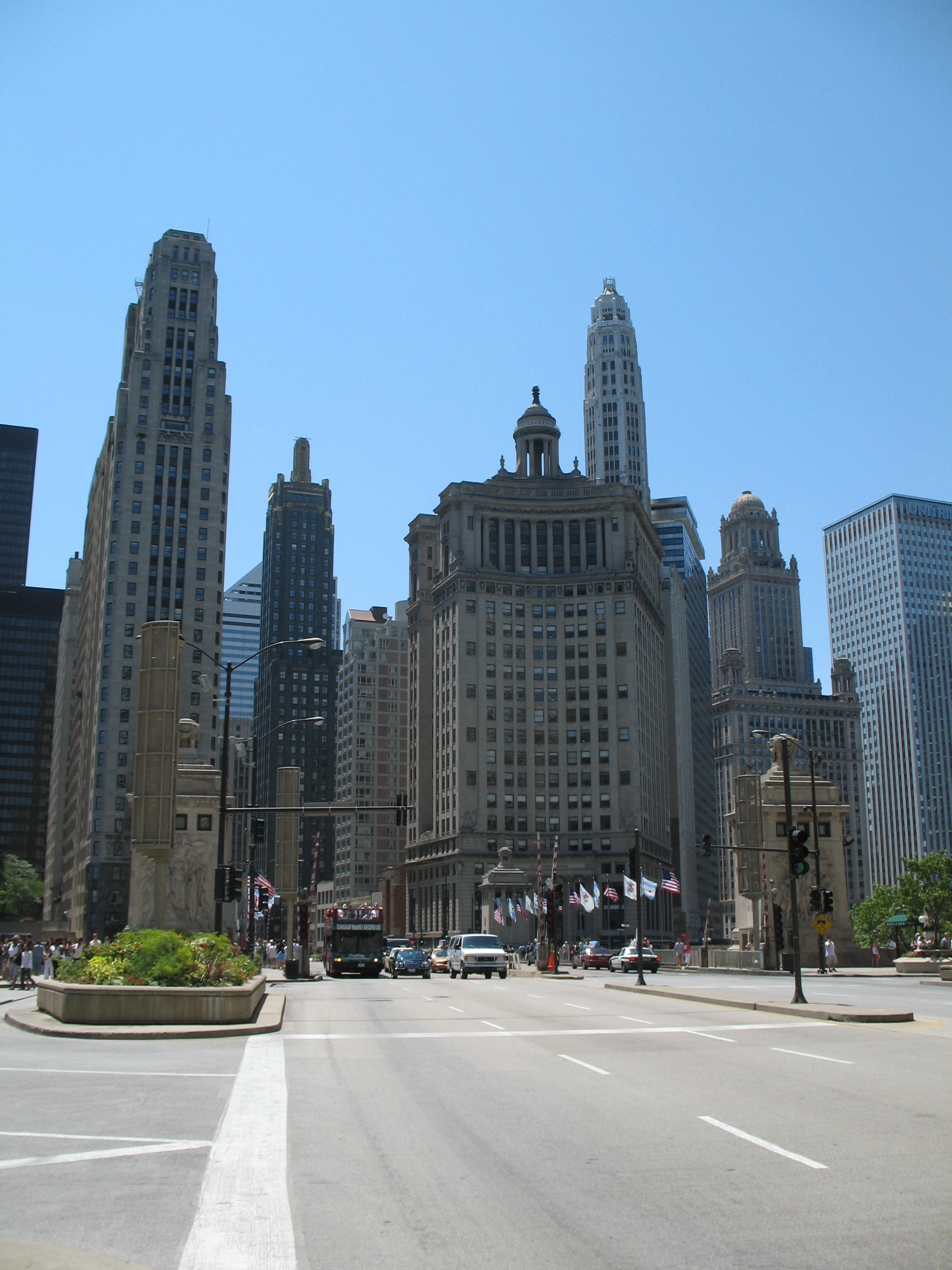
Michigan Avenue Bridge traffic (Background includes 333 North Michigan, Carbide & Carbon Building, London Guarantee Building, Mather Tower & 35 East Wacker).

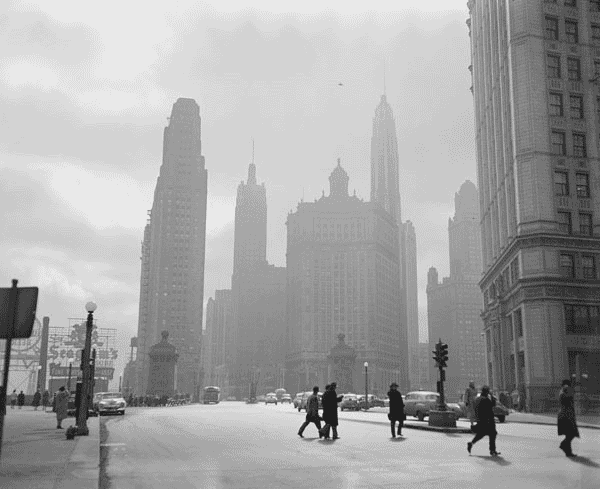
1951 photo with the Carbide & Carbon Building second from the left.

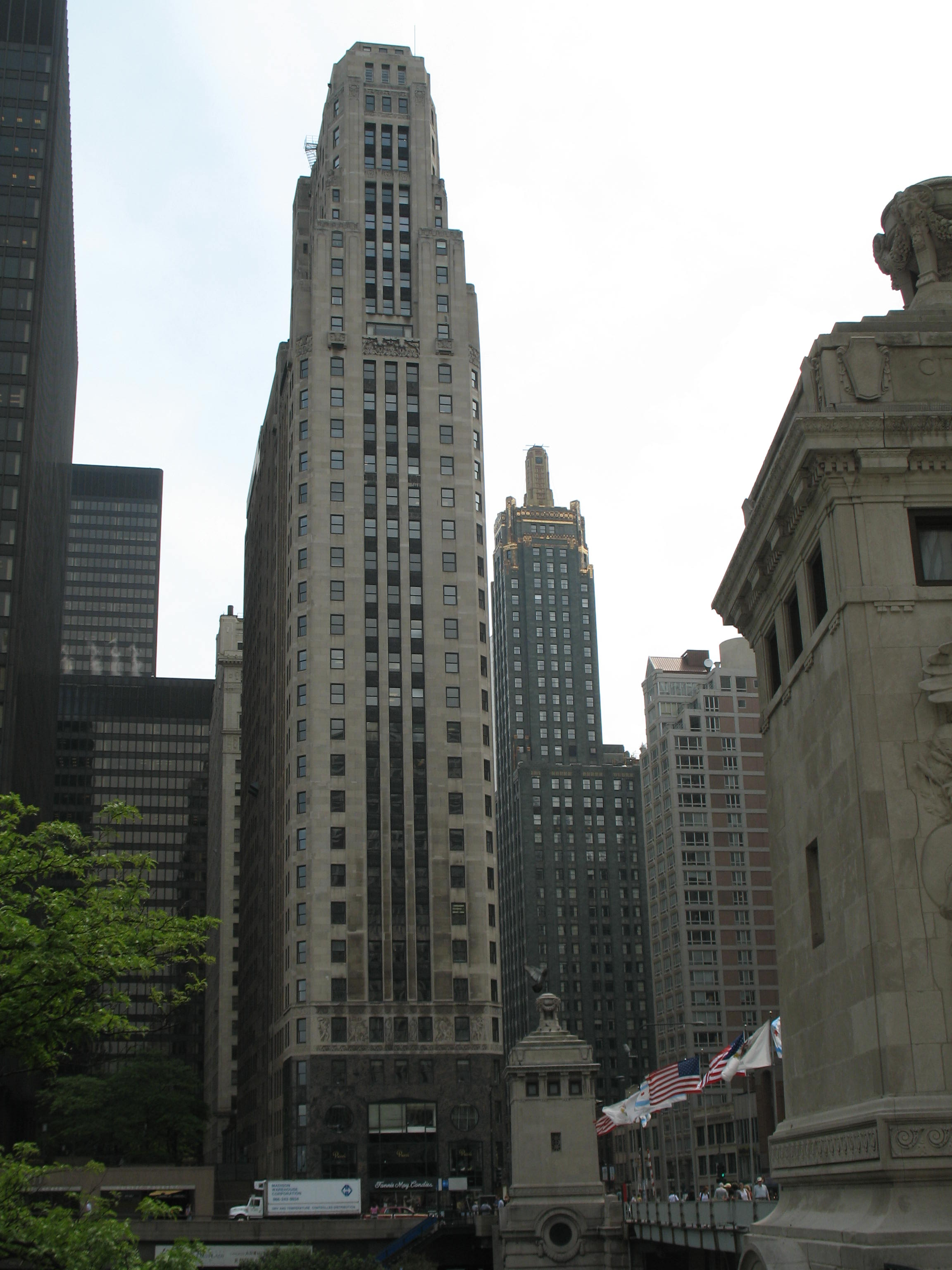
The Carbide & Carbon Building behind 333 North Michigan.

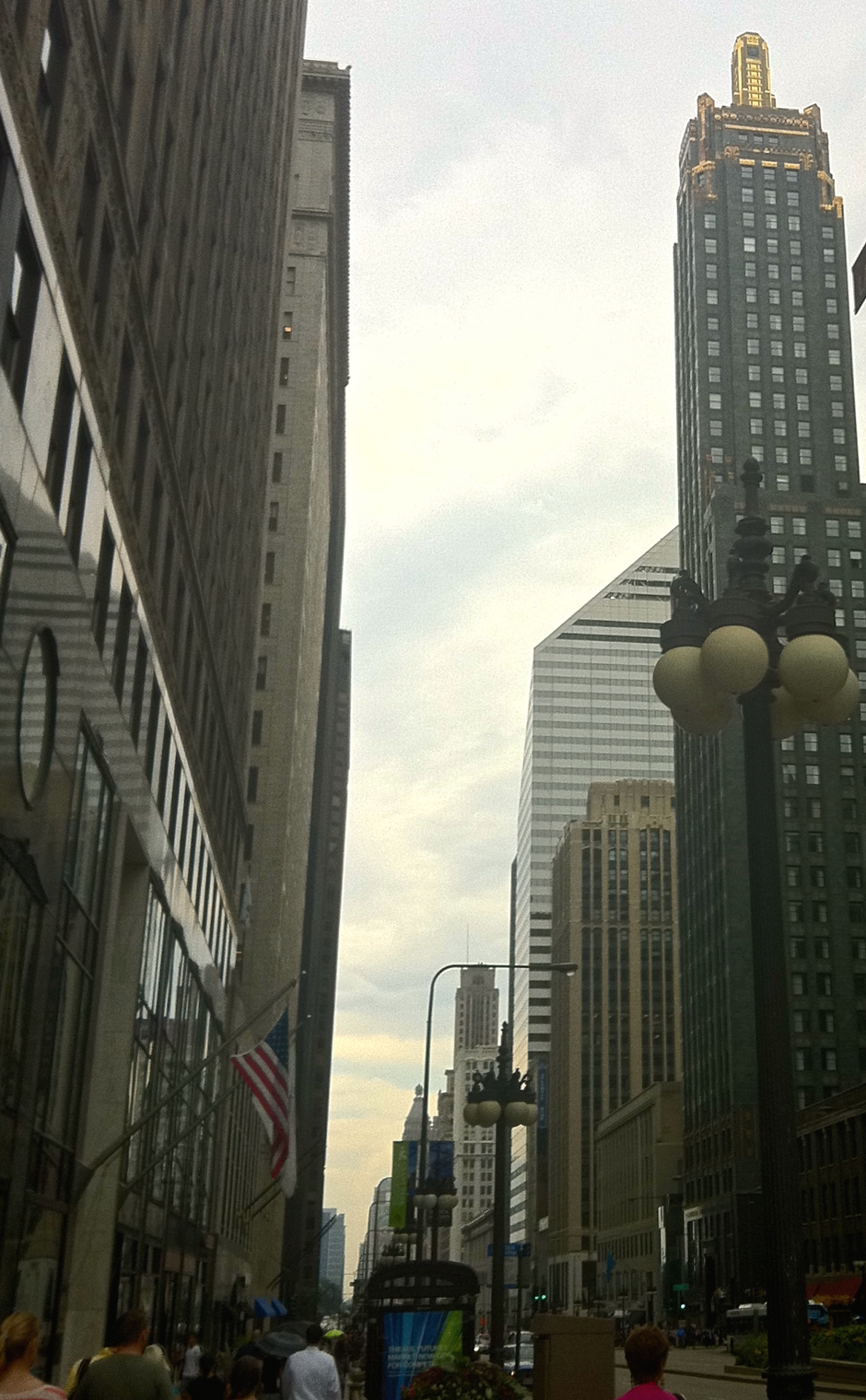
View down Michigan Avenue with the Carbide & Carbon Building seen on the right.

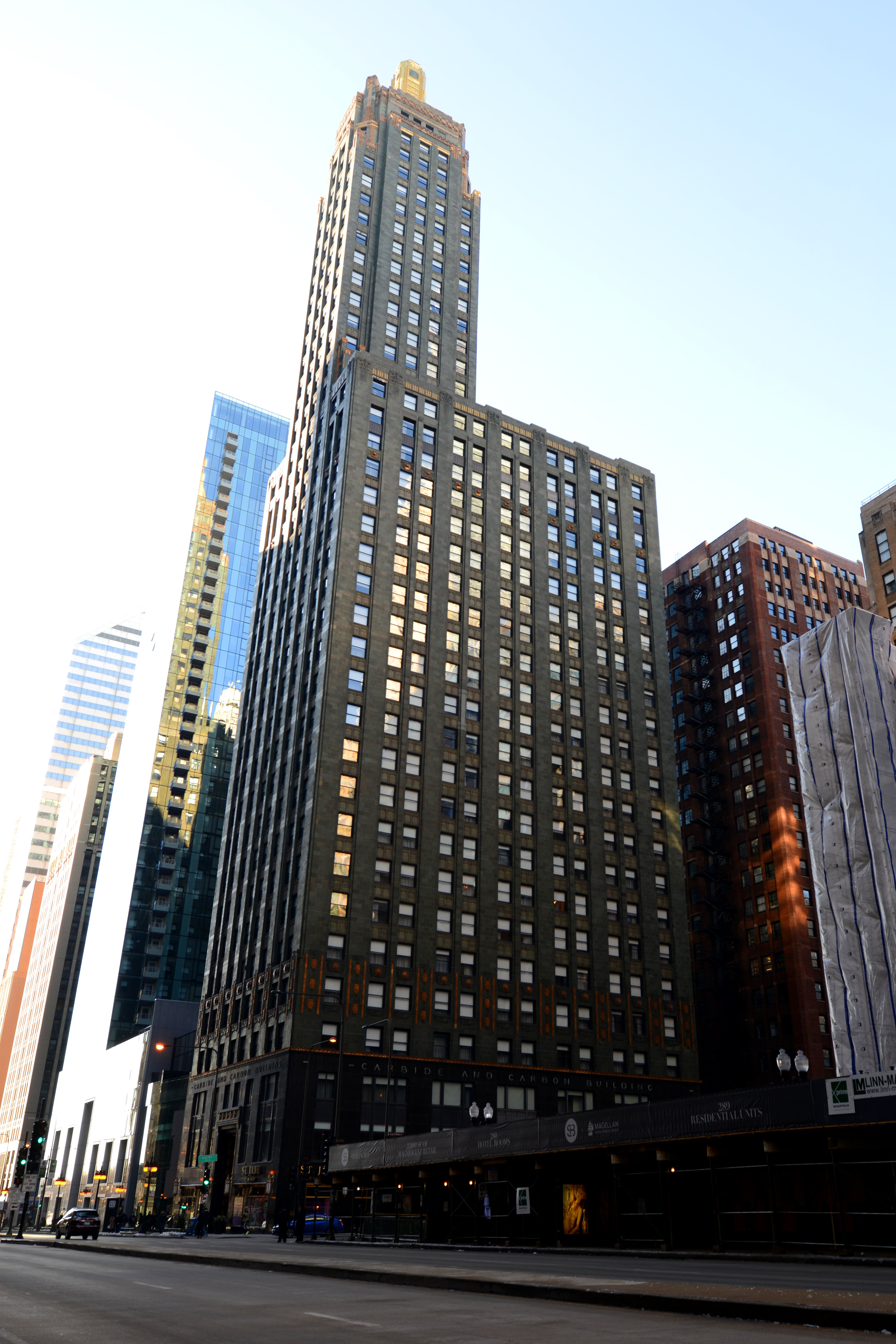
Full northern facade

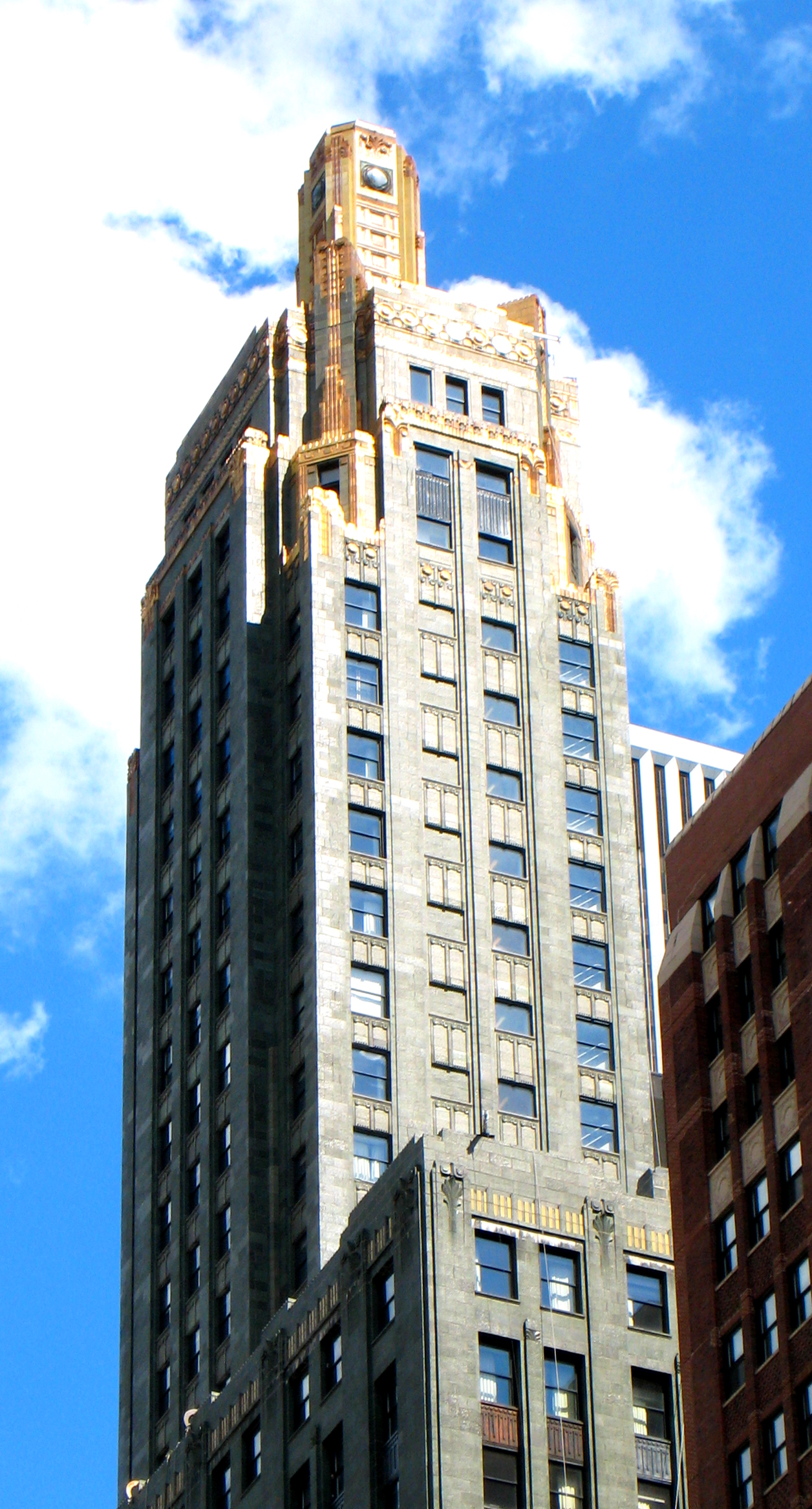

== See also ==
- Chicago architecture
- Daniel Burnham
- Graham, Anderson, Probst & White
- List of Art Deco architecture in Illinois
