= Evanston Ridge Historic District =

Historic district in Illinois, United States

- U.S. National Register of Historic Places
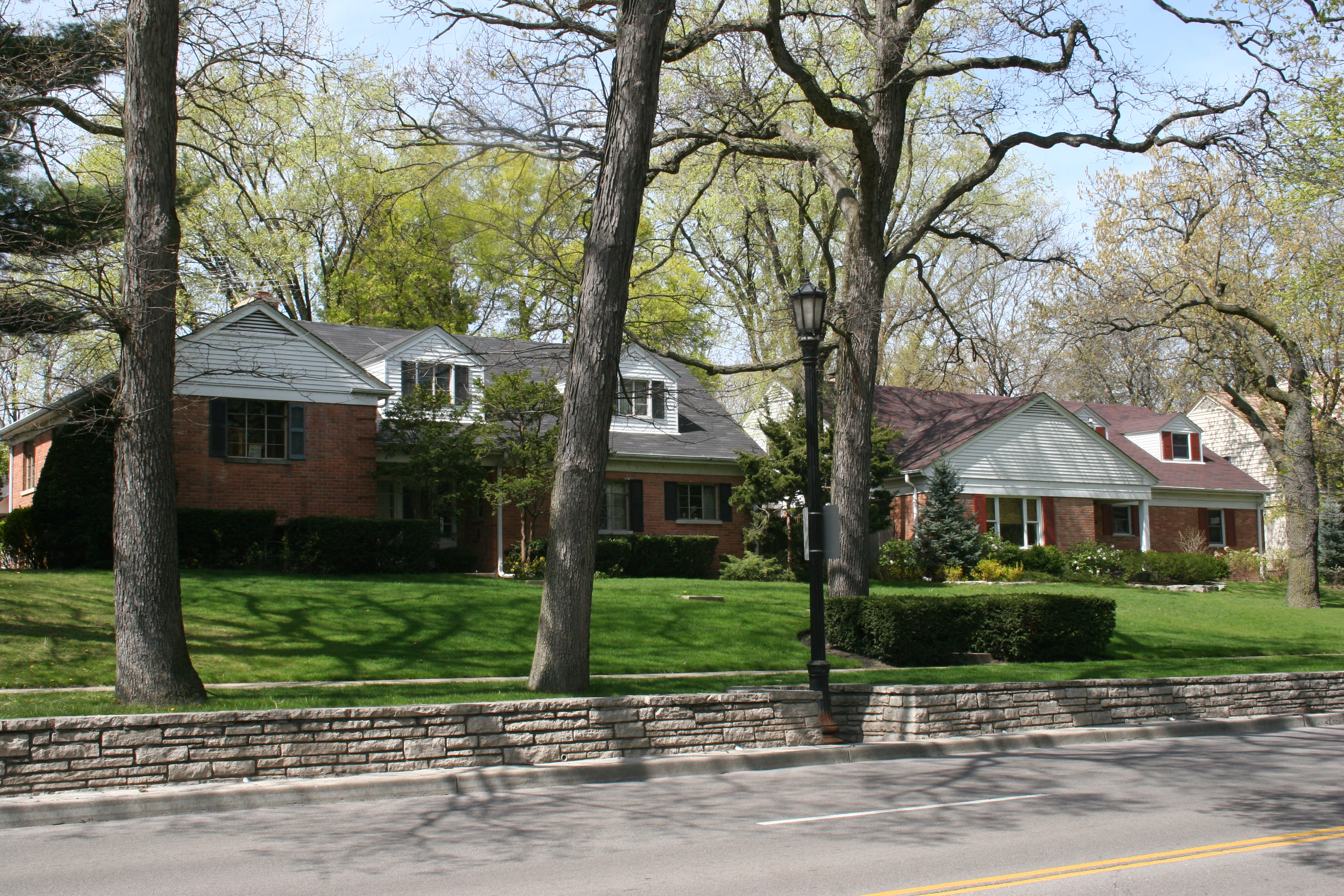

- Location within Chicago metropolitan area Location within Illinois Location within the United States
- Location: Roughly bounded by Main, Asbury, Ashland, Emerson, Ridge and Maple Ave., Evanston, Illinois
- Coordinates: 42°02′35″N 87°41′21″W
- Area: 153.4 acres (62.1 ha)
- NRHP reference No.: 83000309
- Added to NRHP: March 3, 1983

The Evanston Ridge Historic District is a residential historic district in Evanston, Illinois. The district is situated along a glacial ridge that was the site of the first white settlement in Evanston in the 1830s. As the development of Evanston accelerated in the mid-nineteenth century, the ridge became a desirable location for new residents, and the growth of Northwestern University and new rail links to Chicago continued to spur development into the twentieth century. As a result, the houses in the district were built over the course of several decades, with most built between 1860 and 1930. Wealthy Chicagoans were particularly drawn to the area, and its homes frequently had formal architectural designs. The Italianate, Queen Anne, and Prairie School styles are all particularly common in the district.

The district was added to the National Register of Historic Places on March 3, 1983.
