= Berwyn Municipal Building =

- U.S. National Register of Historic Places
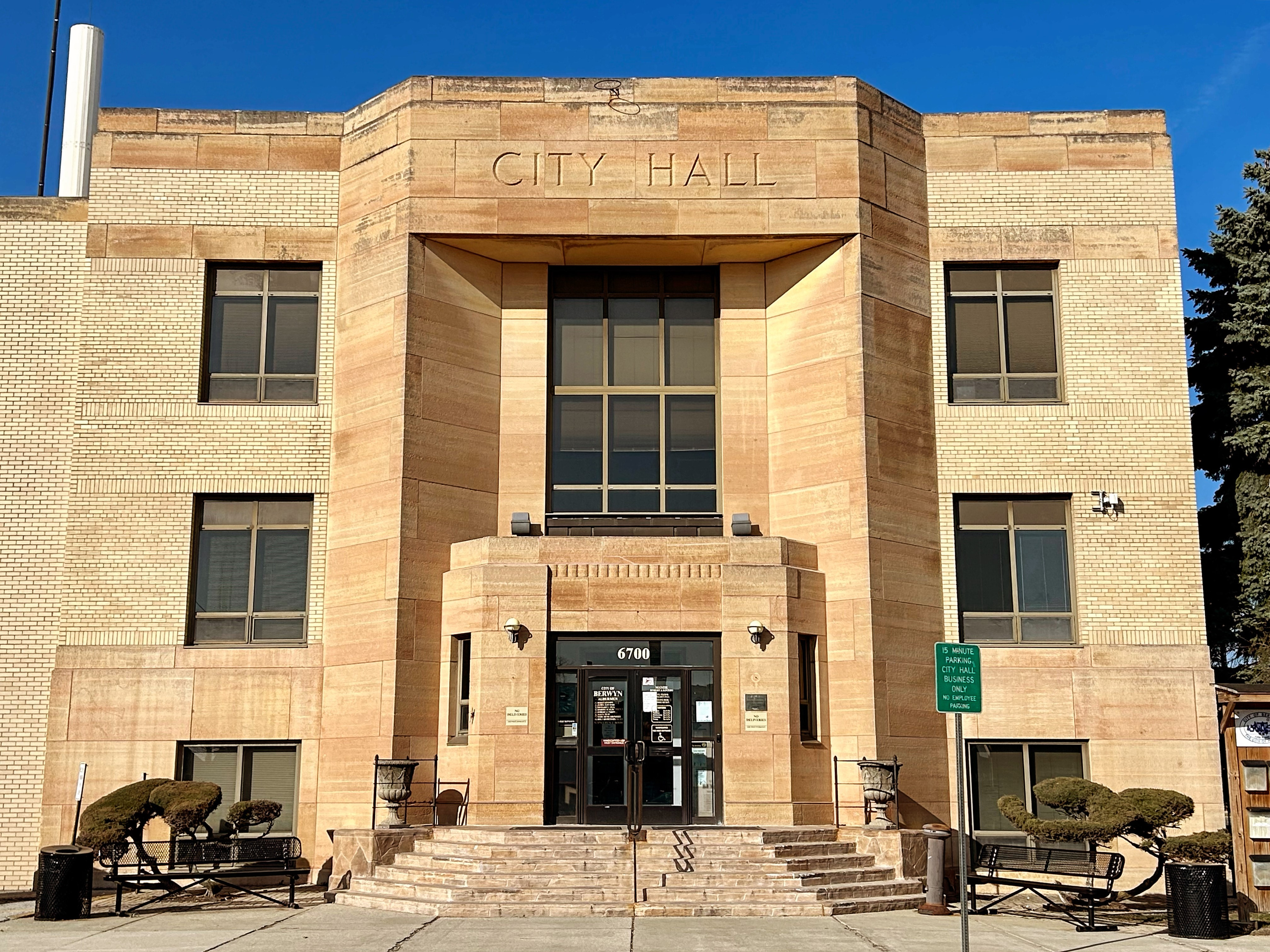

- Location within Illinois Location within the United States
- Location: 6700 26th St., Berwyn, Illinois
- Coordinates: 41°50′35″N 87°47′29″W
- Area: less than one acre
- Built: 1939
- Architect: Burnham & Hammond
- Architectural style: Moderne
- NRHP reference No.: 01000865
- Added to NRHP: August 8, 2001

The Berwyn Municipal Building, also known as Berwyn City Hall, is a historic public building located at 6700 26th Street in Berwyn, Illinois. The building was constructed in 1939 as a Public Works Administration project. The architecture firm of Burnham & Hammond designed the building in the PWA's characteristic PWA Moderne style; their design features square massing, a flat brick and limestone exterior, prism-shaped pilasters, and reeding above the entrance. While the pilasters are in keeping with Moderne design, their prism shape is unusual; they may have been influenced by Burnham's earlier work or by Czech Cubism, given Berwyn's substantial Czech-American population at the time.

The building originally housed Berwyn's city offices, its library, and its police and fire departments. The police department left in the 1960s, and the library closed its branch in the building in the 1980s; the city government and fire department still used the building as of 2001. An addition was placed on the building in 1991 to give it an elevator in compliance with the Americans with Disabilities Act.

The building was added to the National Register of Historic Places on August 8, 2001.
