= List of condominiums in the United States =

A condominium or "condo" is a form of housing tenure and other real property where a specified part of a piece of real estate (usually of an apartment house) is individually owned. Use of land access to common facilities in the piece such as hallways, heating system, elevators, and exterior areas are executed under legal rights associated with the individual ownership. These rights are controlled by the association of owners that jointly represent ownership of the whole piece.

The United States Census Bureau indexes information about condominiums and cooperative apartments, among other types of households, at its Survey of Market Absorption of Apartments. As of October 2015, this compilation includes 95 metropolitan areas of the United States. Some condominium buildings in the United States have been listed on the U.S. National Register of Historic Places. In some cities in the United States, such as Lakewood, Ohio, city governments have attempted to invoke eminent domain upon residents to take over their property and enable private developers to build condominiums. This may be done in an effort to generate more revenue by increasing property tax bases.

A housing cooperative, or co-op, is a legal entity, usually a corporation, which owns real estate, consisting of one or more residential buildings; it is one type of housing tenure. Housing cooperatives are a distinctive form of home ownership that have many characteristics that differ from other residential arrangements such as single family home ownership, condominiums and renting.

== Residential condominiums in the United States ==
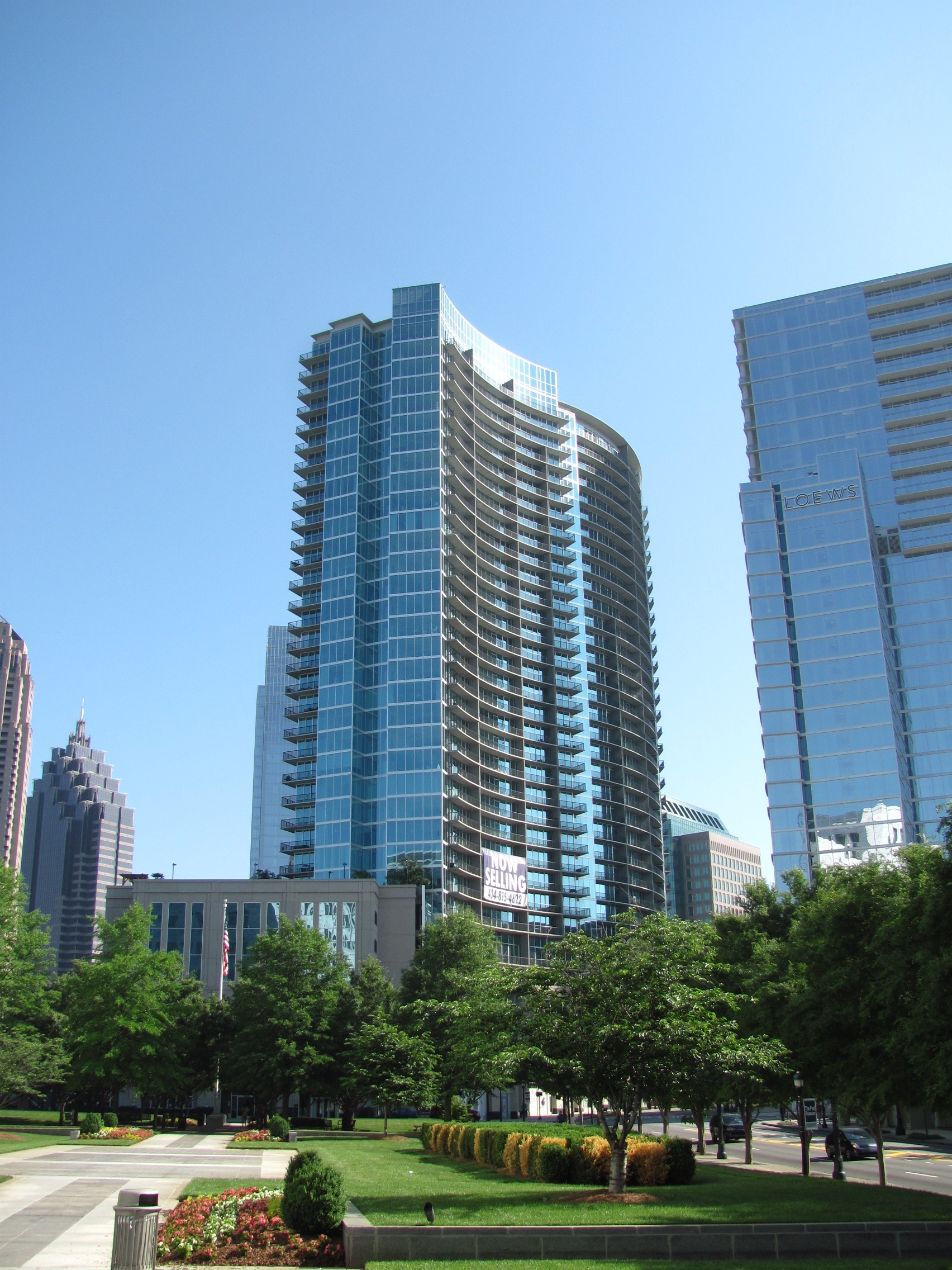
1010 Midtown in Atlanta, Georgia

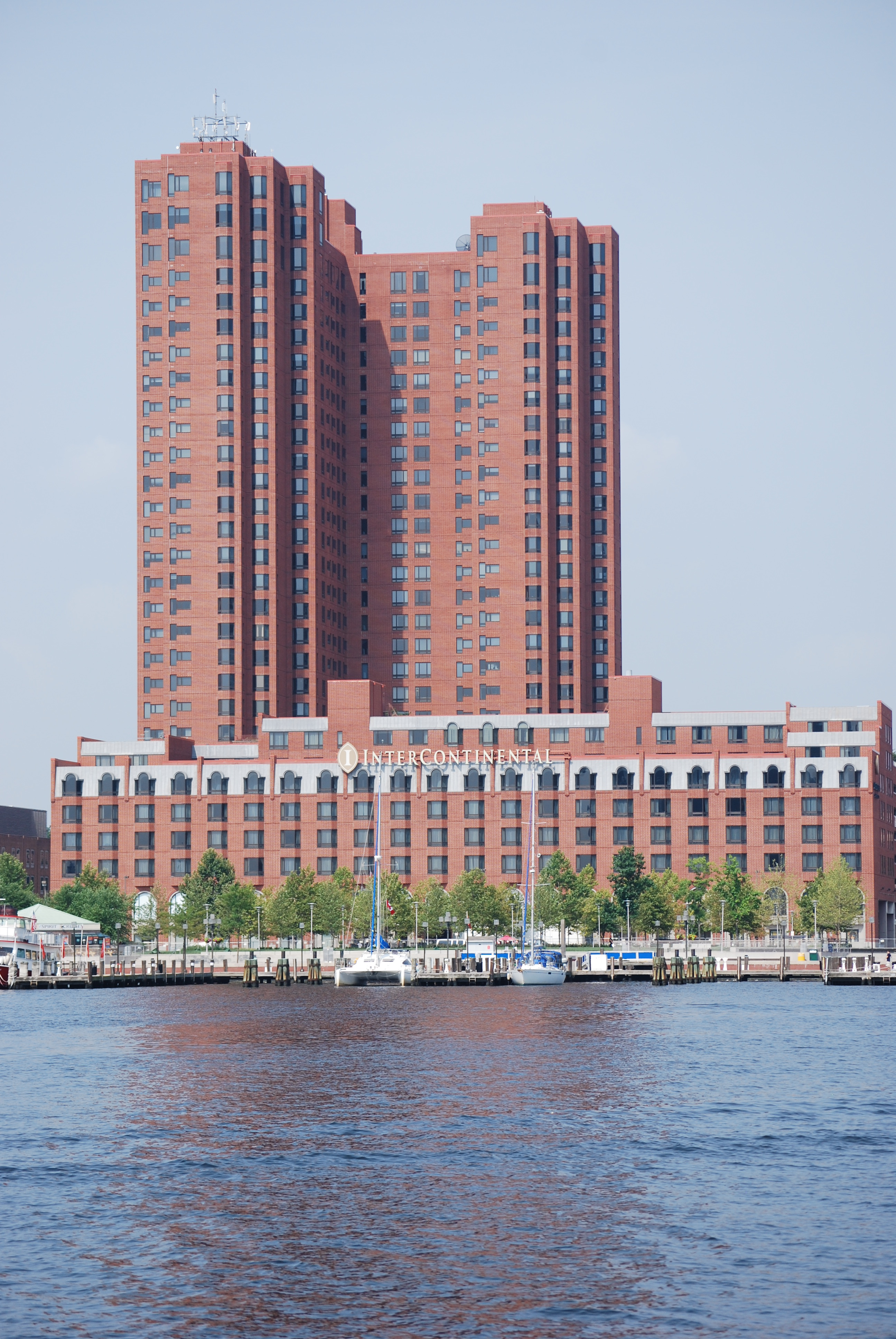
Towers at Harbor Court in Baltimore, Maryland

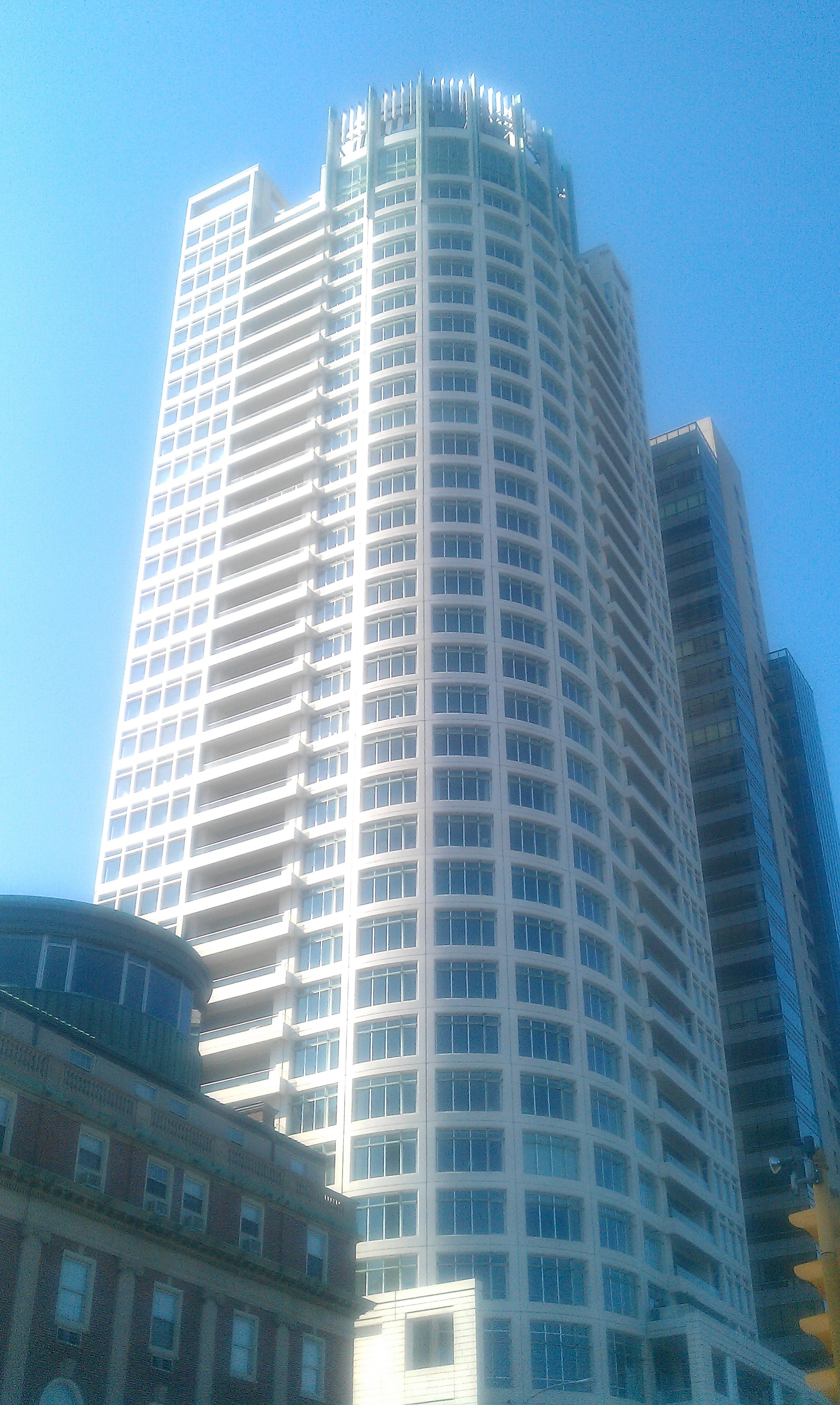
University Club Tower in Milwaukee, Wisconsin

- 1010 Midtown, a 35-story skyscraper in Atlanta, Georgia with 425 condominiums atop 38,000 of retail and dining space.
- 110 East Washington Street, a high rise in Indianapolis, Indiana. Was originally built in 1921–1922 as the main office for National City Bank.
- 1100 Wilshire, residential skyscraper completed in 1987 in Los Angeles, California
- 1280 West, a 38-story l skyscraper in Atlanta, Georgia with 434 units
- 1706 Rittenhouse, a private residence in Rittenhouse Square, Philadelphia, Pennsylvania. It is known for being an expensive residential building, with many units costing over $3.9 million
- 2727 Kirby, a 30-story, 96 unit, condominium high rise, designed by Ziegler Coope and located in Upper Kirby just south of Westheimer in Houston, Texas
- 2828 Peachtree
- 3344 Peachtree
- 360 Condominiums
- 99 West on South Temple – City Creek Center, Salt Lake City, Utah
- Ambassador Apartments – located in Portland, Oregon, it was added to the U.S. National Register of Historic Places in 1979
- The Austonian
- Baskerville Apartment Building – located in Madison, Wisconsin; added to the National Register of Historic Places in 1988
- Brooks Tower
- Buckhead Grand
- The Carlyle – Pittsburgh
- CenterCourt
- The Century – Los Angeles
- The Century Towers
- The Condominiums at North Bank Park
- Continental Building
- Cornwall Apartments – listed on the National Register of Historic Places in 1976, it is located in the Capitol Hill section of Denver, Colorado
- Cray Plaza
- D.T. Porter Building
- Eastern Columbia Building
- Endeavour (building)—Located near the Johnson Space Center, Endeavour Condominiums are on Clear Lake waterfront in Houston's Bay Area. Designed by EDI International, this 30-story tower is a community of 80 residences.
- Everett Station Lofts
- Galaxy Towers
- GLG Grand
- Grand Avenue Project
- Grande Condominiums
- Graystone Manor
- Hamilton Watch Complex
- Harbor Towers
- HarborView Condominium
- Healey Building
- Hotel Kimball
- Hunter's Key – Tampa, Florida
- Key Colony – condominium
- Mandarin Oriental, Atlanta
- Metropolis Condominium, a 21-story twin-tower condominium in Atlanta, Georgia with 498 condominiums atop 40,000 sq ft of retail and dining space.
- The Mercer West Tower
- Oceanwide Center
- One Lincoln Park – Denver, Colorado
- One Thousand Ocean
- Palms Place
- The Paramount at Buckhead
- Park Avenue Condominiums
- Park Building – Cleveland, Ohio
- Park Place – Atlanta, Georgia
- Park Plaza Condominiums
- Park Towers – Sandy Springs, Georgia
- Paseo Colorado
- Pennsbury Village – Pennsylvania
- The Regent – City Creek Center, Salt Lake City, Utah
- The Residences at The Ritz-Carlton – Philadelphia, Pennsylvania
- Richards Court – City Creek Center, Salt Lake City, Utah
- Sampson Altadena Condominiums
- Sierra Towers
- Signature Place
- Silo Point
- Society Hill Towers
- Spire – Atlanta, Georgia
- The Spires – Houston, Texas
- Streamline Tower
- Textile Center Building – a 12-story Gothic Revival and Italian Renaissance Revival architectural styled brick building located in the Los Angeles Fashion District; listed on the National Register of Historic Places in 2005
- Thai Xuan Village
- Three PNC Plaza
- Towers at Harbor Court
- Trump Towers – Sunny Isles Beach, Florida
- TWELVE Midtown
- Union Station – Pittsburgh, Pennsylvania
- University Club Tower – Milwaukee, Wisconsin
- ViewPoint
- Village Green – Los Angeles, California
- The Watermark Detroit
- Waterplace
- Wilshire Regent
- Woodlands – Lexington, Kentucky

== By location ==
=== Residential condominiums in Miami, Florida ===
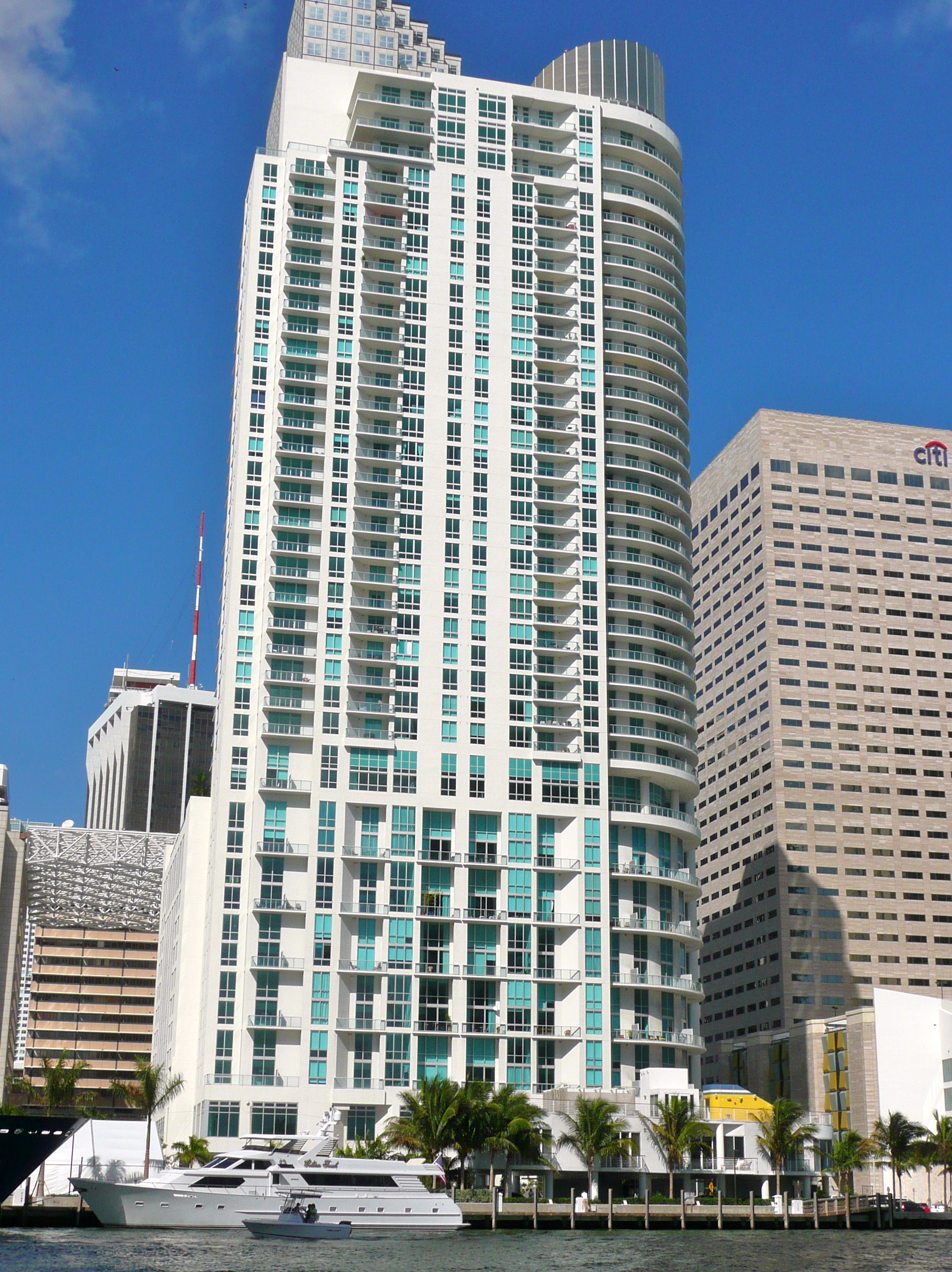
Met 1

- 50 Biscayne – a 57-story skyscraper condominium with architecture based on the Miami Modern style; has many design features that pay tribute to landscape architect Roberto Burle Marx's emphasis on natural aesthetics seen along the bay
- 500 Brickell – residential complex in the Brickell neighborhood
- 900 Biscayne Bay – skyscraper; northeastern Downtown
- Atlantis Condominium
- Capital at Brickell – a proposed complex of two skyscrapers in the Brickell neighborhood
- EPIC Miami Residences and Hotel – a condo-hotel being constructed by Lionstone Hotels and Resorts
- Four Seasons Hotel Miami – contains a Toronto-based Four Seasons Hotel property, office space and several residential condominium units
- Met 1 – residential skyscraper located in the Metropolitan Miami complex
- Met 3 – part of Metropolitan Miami, a complex of four skyscrapers in the central business district
- Metropolis at Dadeland – a pair of skyscraper condos in the Dadeland neighborhood
- Metropolitan Miami – mixed-use development consisting of three completed skyscrapers, a fourth uncompleted building, and a lifestyle center
- One Fifty One at Biscayne – residential property in North Miami; consists of 373 condominiums
- Panorama Tower – mixed-use skyscraper under construction in the Brickell neighborhood
- Paramount Bay at Edgewater Square – a high-rise condominium building in the Edgewater Neighborhood
- Riverfront – complex containing three main towers: "Mint" and "The Ivy" and "Wind"
- Ten Museum Park – residential skyscraper
- Toscano – group of residential condos in the Dadeland neighborhood
- Villa Magna Condominiums – urban development that was planned to rise in Brickell; the housing crisis of the late 2000s halted the project

=== Residential condominiums in Chicago, Illinois ===
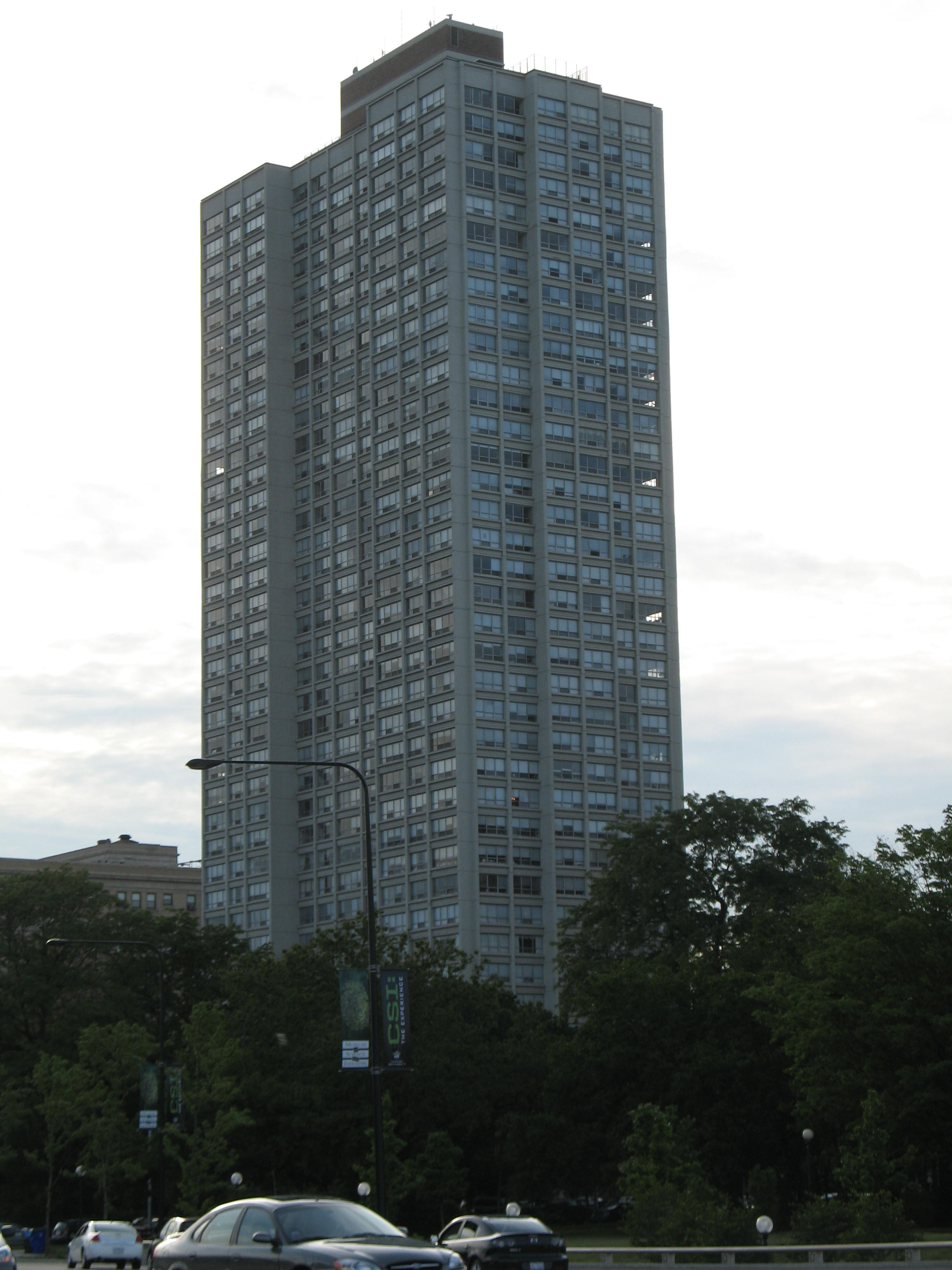
1700 East 56th Street

- 108 North State Street, a 21-story residential condominium tower in an urban center located in the Loop community area of downtown Chicago, Illinois
- 1700 East 56th Street – apartment building; underwent a condominium conversion in 1994
- 235 Van Buren, A 46 story skyscraper designed by Perkins & Will and built by CMK Companies located in Chicago's Loop neighborhood
- 340 on the Park
- 401 East Ontario
- 55 East Erie Street
- 680 N Lake Shore Drive
- 900 North Michigan
- Aqua
- Brewster Apartments
- The Buckingham
- Chicago Place
- Chicago Spire
- Elysées Condominiums
- The Fordham
- Fulton House
- Grand Plaza I
- The Grant
- Hampton House
- Harbor Point
- The Heritage at Millennium Park
- Joffrey Tower
- John Hancock Center
- Lake Point Tower
- Legacy Tower
- Mandarin Oriental
- Manhattan Building
- Marina City
- Metropolitan Tower
- Mid-Continental Plaza
- The Montgomery
- Montgomery Ward Company Complex
- North Harbor Tower
- North Pier Apartments
- Old Chicago Main Post Office Twin Towers
- Olympia Centre
- One Magnificent Mile
- One Museum Park
- Outer Drive East
- Palmolive Building
- Park Place Tower
- Park Tower
- Park Tower Condominium
- The Parkshore
- The Pinnacle
- Plaza 440
- Plaza on DeWitt
- River East Center
- River Plaza
- Skybridge
- Trump International Hotel and Tower
- Waldorf Astoria Chicago
- Waldorf-Astoria Hotel and Residence Tower
- Water Tower Place
- Wolf Point South Tower

=== Condominiums and housing cooperatives in New York ===
- Trump Tower – a 35-story condominium located in the city of White Plains in Westchester County

==== Residential condominiums in New York City ====
- 1 Lincoln Plaza
- 20 Exchange Place
- 30 Park Place
- 50 West Street
- 56 Leonard Street
- 88 Greenwich Street
- 157 East 72nd Street
- 161 West 93rd Street
- 252 East 57th Street
- 432 Park Avenue
- 459 West 18th Street
- 731 Lexington Avenue
- The Apthorp
- Belaire Apartments
- Carnegie Hill Tower
- Cassa Hotel 45th Street New York
- Chelsea Modern
- Cleburne Building
- The Continental NYC
- Downtown Athletic Club
- Gilsey House
- New York Cancer Hospital
- One Riverside Park
- One57
- Riverside South, Manhattan
- Silver Towers
- Time Warner Center
- Trump Palace Condominiums
- Trump SoHo
- Trump Tower
- Trump World Tower
- W New York Downtown Hotel and Residences
- Williamsburgh Savings Bank Tower

===== Condominiums and housing cooperatives in the Bronx =====
- Amalgamated Housing Cooperative
- Co-op City
- Parkchester

==== Condominiums and housing cooperatives in Brooklyn ====
- 47 Plaza Street West
- Amalgamated Warbasse Houses
- Lindsay Park – housing cooperative
- On Prospect Park
- Seabreeze Plaza Condominium located at 3111 Ocean Parkway

===== Condominiums and housing cooperatives in Manhattan =====
- 1049 5th Avenue
- 15 Central Park West
- 173 and 176 Perry Street
- 2 Horatio Street
- 257 Central Park West
- 299 West 12th Street
- 302 West 12th Street
- 353 Central Park West
- 36 East 72nd Street
- 370 Riverside Drive
- 408 Greenwich Street
- 432 Park Avenue
- 459 West 18th Street
- 45 Christopher Street
- 520 West 28th
- 55 Central Park West
- 59 West 12th Street
- 620 Park Avenue
- 625 Park Avenue
- 655 Park Avenue
- 740 Park Avenue
- 810 Fifth Avenue
- 834 Fifth Avenue
- 880 Fifth Avenue
- 907 Fifth Avenue
- 927 Fifth Avenue
- 930 Fifth Avenue
- 970 Park Avenue
- 998 Fifth Avenue
- The Ansonia
- The Apthorp
- The Ariel
- Astor Court Building
- Atelier
- Barbizon Hotel
- The Beresford
- C-Squat
- Casa 74
- Castle Village
- The Century – Central Park West, Manhattan
- The Colosseum – Manhattan
- Confucius Plaza
- Cooperative Village
- The Cornwall
- The Dakota
- The Dorilton
- Dunbar Apartments
- The El Dorado
- Hotel Chelsea
- Housing Conservation Coordinators
- Hudson View Gardens
- The Level Club
- Lincoln Towers
- Madison Green
- The Majestic
- MiMA
- Morningside Gardens
- The Normandy
- One Madison
- Osborne Apartments
- Palazzo Chupi
- Park Cinq
- Penn South
- The Prasada
- Pythian Temple
- River House
- The San Remo
- Southbridge Towers
- Trump International Hotel and Tower
- Tudor City

===== Condominiums and housing cooperatives in Queens =====
- Breezy Point – cooperative in which all residents pay the maintenance, security, and community-oriented costs involved with keeping the community private; the cooperative owns the entire 500-acre (2 km2) community; residents own their homes and hold shares in the cooperative, less urbanized than most of the rest of New York City
- Forest Hills Co-op Houses – cooperative houses are located on an 8.5-acre (34,000 m2) site at 108–03 62nd Drive on the border of the Queens neighborhoods of Forest Hills and Corona
- North Shore Towers – three-building residential cooperative located in the Floral Park neighborhood, near the city's border with Nassau County
- Rochdale Village – housing complex and neighborhood in the southeastern corner of Queens; located in Community Board 12; grouped as part of Greater Jamaica, corresponding to the former Town of Jamaica
- Roxbury – inholding within the borders of the Breezy Point Unit of Gateway National Recreation Area, of the US National Park System

=== Residential condominiums in San Francisco, California ===
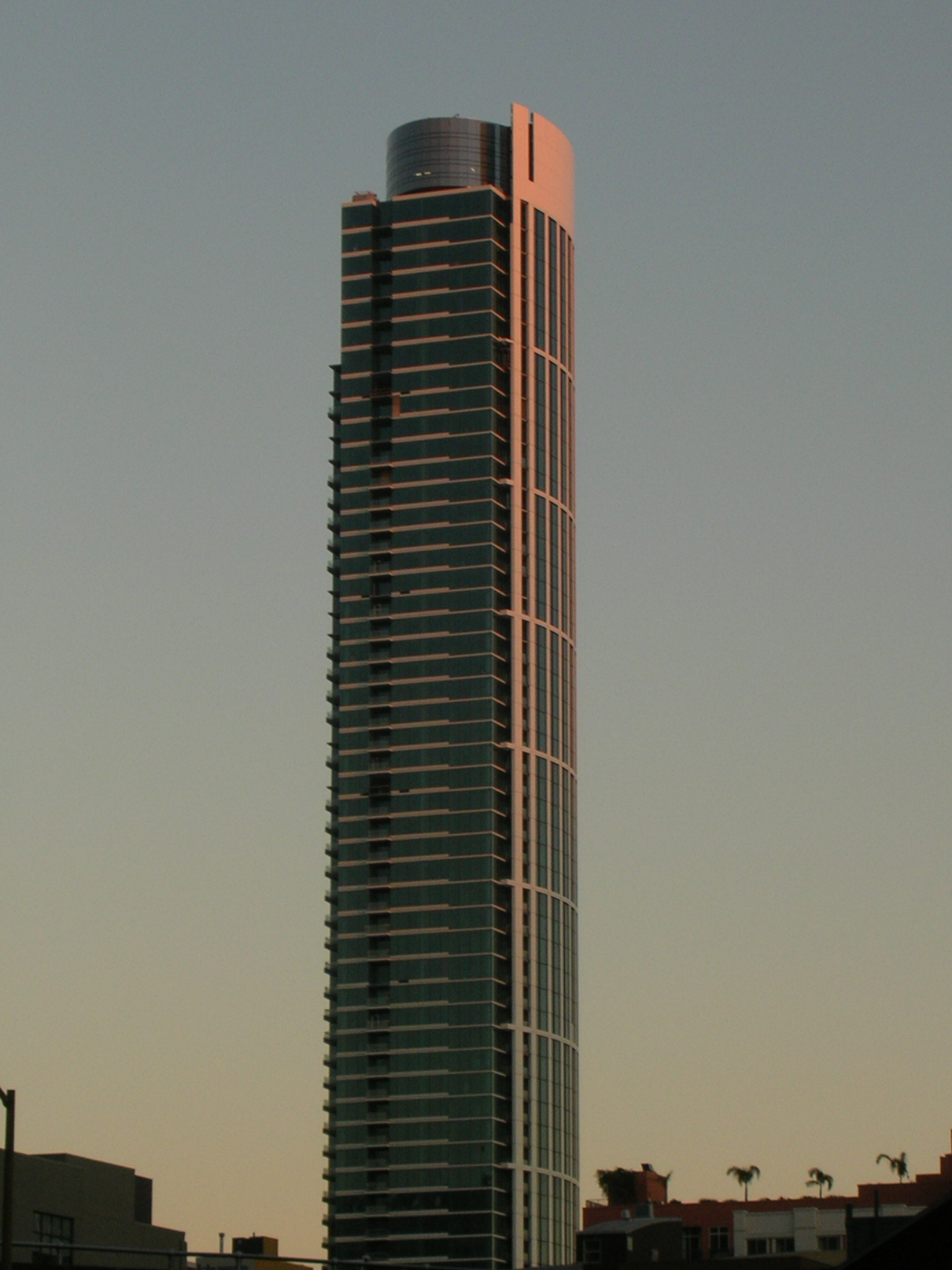
One Rincon Hill

- 181 Fremont Street
- 340 Fremont Street
- 399 Fremont Street
- Four Seasons Hotel
- Jasper
- Millennium Tower
- The Montgomery
- One Rincon Hill
- The Paramount

=== Residential condominiums in Washington, D.C. ===
- The Cairo
- Carolina On The Hill
- CityCenterDC
- Columbia Hospital for Women
- Miller House
- Washington Harbour
- Waterfront Tower

== See also ==
- List of New York City housing cooperatives
- List of condo hotels in the United States
- List of condominiums in Canada
