= Lindsay Park =

Lindsay Park may refer to:

- Lindsay Park (Davenport, Iowa)
- Lindsay Park (housing cooperative), Brooklyn, New York
- Lindsay Park Elementary School of School District 6 Rocky Mountain, British Columbia
- MNP Community & Sport Centre, Calgary, Alberta, formerly known as Lindsay Park Sports Centre
- Lindsay Hansen Park, acting director for the Salt Lake City non-profit Sunstone
