= Hamilton Harlow =

American architect (1890–1964)

Hamilton Harlow (1890–1964) was an American architect known for his apartment buildings in Cambridge, Massachusetts. Harlow's pioneering work in bringing large apartment buildings to Cambridge made a significant mark on the cityscape surrounding Harvard Square and Harvard University. Today, Harlow's apartments are known for their charming layouts: real estate listings regularly note when an apartment is in a "Harlow Building."

== Career ==
Harlow attended the Massachusetts Institute of Technology, where he received a Bachelors of Science in Architecture in 1914. His thesis was a design for a Terminal Railroad Station.

In 1916, Harlow was working from 101 Tremont Street, Boston. In 1919, Harlow joined Albert H. Dow and Kenneth C. Kimball in founding Dow, Harlow, and Kimball, Architects and Engineers, in Boston, Massachusetts. An announcement of the new partnership in the journal Architecture called Harlow "a well known young Boston Architect." Kimball's speciality was engineering, while Dow was a well-established figure. In 1921, Harlow left Dow, Harlow, and Kimball to start his own firm, opening an office at 1388 Massachusetts Avenue. Harlow's father, Frank S. Harlow, was a builder, and many of Harlow's architectural plans were for properties owned by his father. Harlow's offices in 1927 were at 4 Brattle Street.

Hamilton Harlow and his spouse, Georgeana, had a son, Robert Moore Harlow (1917-1994). The father and son founded Harlow Properties, Inc., a real estate management firm that for 40 years managed apartments and performed condominium conversions across Cambridge; the firm's "kindness to tenants who came on hard financial times" and development of programs to help "elderly tenants and first-time tenant homeowners...to purchase their units" led the city of Cambridge to honor Robert Harlow with an honorary square in 2003.

== Apartment buildings in Cambridge, Massachusetts ==
- 7 Sumner Road, 1917 (Acquired by Harvard and converted to offices in 1976)
- Spencer Court, 9 Dana Street, constructed 1927
- 44 Langdon Street, brick, 12 units, constructed 1915
- 7 Linnaean Street
- 41-43 Linnaean Street, Peabody Court Apartments, Building on the corner of Linnaean and Avon Hill
- 46 Shepard Street
- 77 and 79 Martin Street, brick, 32 apartments
- 11 Story Street, stucco, 25 condominiums
- 61 Garfield Street, 17 units
- 52 Garden Street, brick, 42 units, elevator building, 1924
- Bowdoin Court, 39 and 41 Bowdoin Street, Brick, 33 units, 1927
- Proposed: 9 Dana Street, 25 apartments, 1927.
- Proposed: 356 Harvard St and Ellery St., 1929. "Superstructure plans drawn—will be figured in the spring for the apartment building of 24 suites to be erected at 253 Harvard and Ellery streets, for J. A. Carrig, 1374 Massachusetts avenue. Plans by Architects Hamilton, Harlow, 4 Brattle street." The building at this location is called "The President."
- 56 Concord Avenue, 1930

== Other known buildings ==
Seven residences on Brooks Street, Medford, Massachusetts, 1916.

Blue Door gift shop, Dixfield, Maine, ca. 1930s
