= Cassa =

Cassa may refer to:

- Federico Cassa, (born 2006), Italian professional footballer
- Cassa Hotel & Residences, building in Midtown Manhattan in New York City, United States

== See also ==
- Casa (disambiguation)
