= Plaza 440 =

Condominium building in Chicago, Illinois

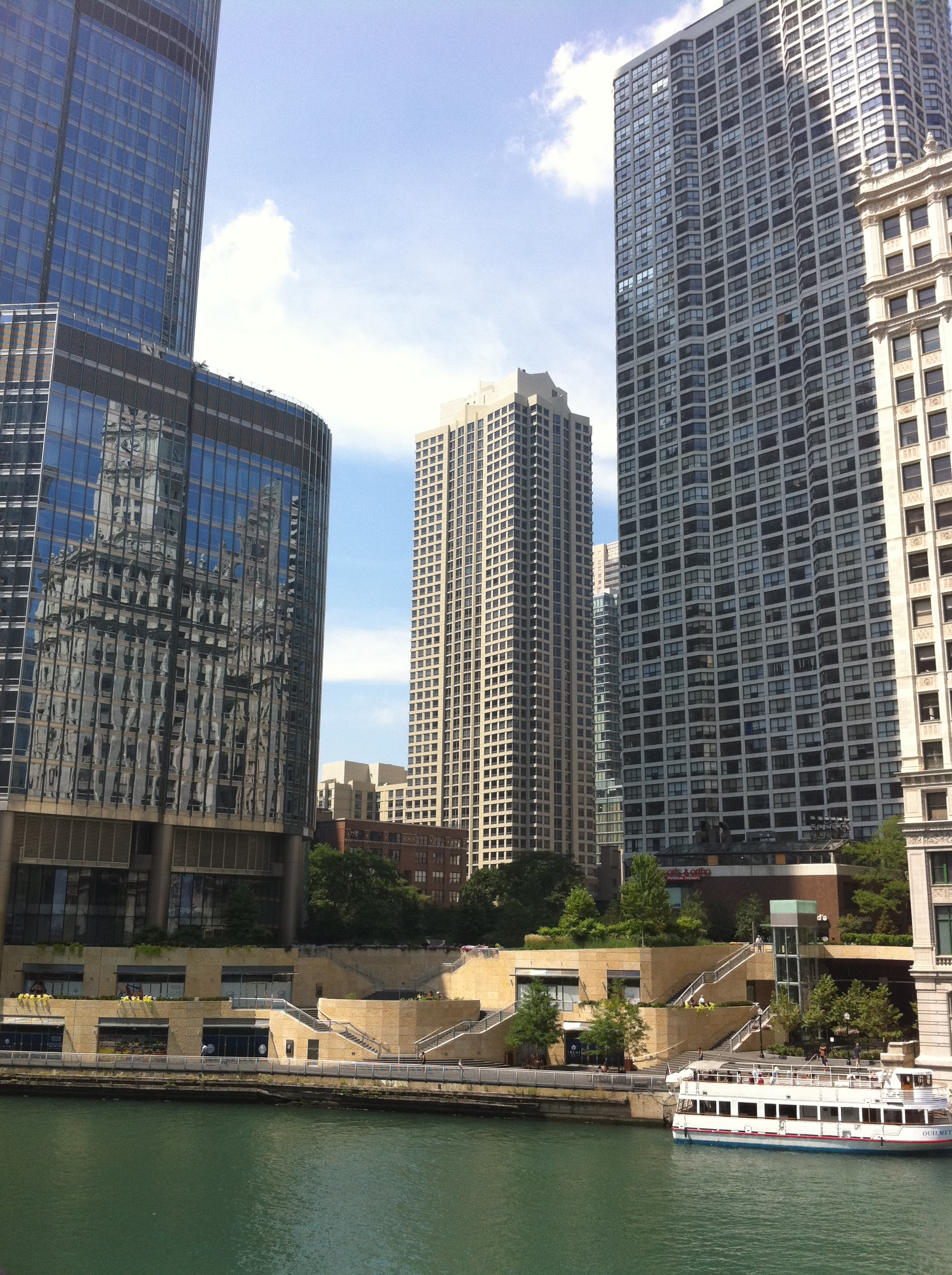
- Plaza 440 (center) as seen from the Michigan Avenue Bridge. Also in this photo: Trump Tower Chicago (left), River Plaza (right), Wrigley Building (seen both on the right and on the left as a reflection off the Trump Tower glass windows).
- Interactive map of the Plaza 440 area

General information
- Type: Residential
- Location: 440 North Wabash Avenue; Chicago, Illinois
- Coordinates: 41.889998°N 87.626646°W
- Completed: 1992
- Management: Community Specialists

Height
- Architectural: 146.31 m (480 ft)

Technical details
- Floor count: 49

Design and construction
- Architect: Solomon Cordwell Buenz
- Developer: John Buck Company

Plaza 440 is a 49-story residential condominium building located in downtown Chicago, Illinois.

Originally built in 1992, it underwent a condominium conversion in 2005. The building contains 457 residential units and shares a 2,000,000-square-foot (190,000 m^{2}) mixed-use development with a 336-room Marriott hotel and a 400-space parking garage. It rises from the northwest corner of Wabash and Hubbard streets in the River North district of Chicago's Near North Side.

Plaza 440 was designed by Solomon, Cordwell, Buenz and Associates, built by the John Buck Company and originally managed by its subsidiary, the John Buck Management Group. The building opened to residents in October 1991, but construction was not fully completed until 1992. 90% of the building's units were leased by August 1992. Plaza 440 was the last residential high-rise built in Chicago for years to come.

The building was sold to American Invsco in September 2004 at a price of US$107 million. The previous owners, Archstone-Smith, had purchased the building two years previously for US$24 million. This is the current equivalent of US$182 million and US$43 million, respectively.
