= Desires Hotels =

American hotel management company

- Industry: Hospitality
- Headquarters: Miami, Florida., U.S.
- Website: desireresorts.com

Desires Hotels is an American hotel management company based in Miami, Florida. It was a division of Tecton Hospitality before Tecton merged with Ocean Blue Hospitality in 2010. The merged companies currently operate under the name Trust Hospitality.

Desires Hotels operates a number of hotels, including the Iron Horse Hotel in Milwaukee, Wisconsin. It will manage the hotel in Cassa Hotel & Residences in New York City once the building is complete.
