= Center Court =

Center Court refers to:

- Centre Court, the main court at a tennis complex, specifically at Wimbledon.
- CenterCourt, a development in Kentucky.
- A series on Tennis Channel
