= 1700 East 56th Street =

Condominium building in Chicago, Illinois

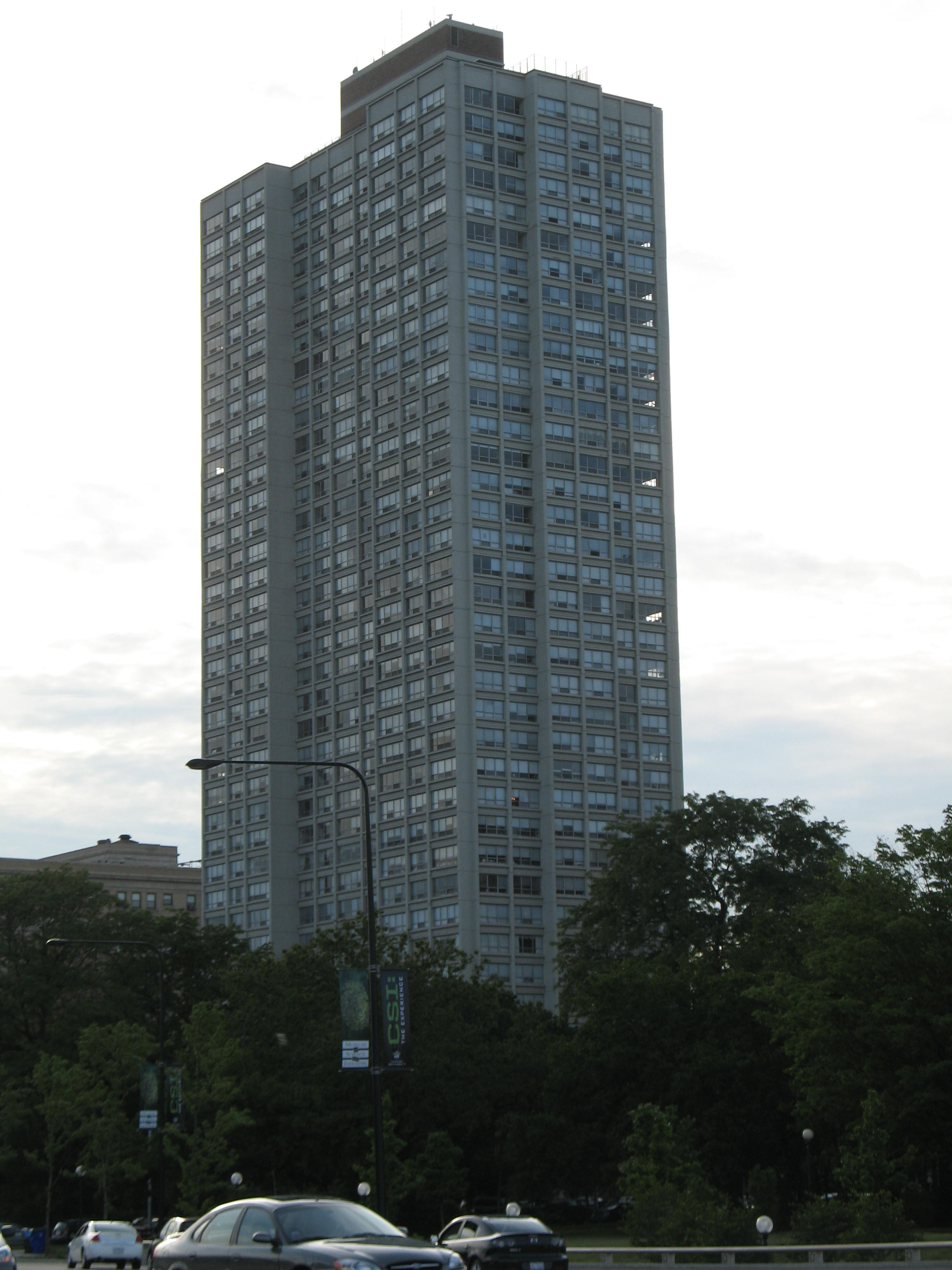
- The tallest building in Chicago south of 13th Street
- Interactive map of the 1700 East 56th Street area

General information
- Location: 1700 E. 56th Street. Chicago, Illinois
- Coordinates: 41.7936°N 87.5831°W
- Completed: 1968

Height
- Roof: 376 feet (115 m)

Technical details
- Floor count: 40

Design and construction
- Architects: Loewenberg & Loewenberg

Website
- Official website

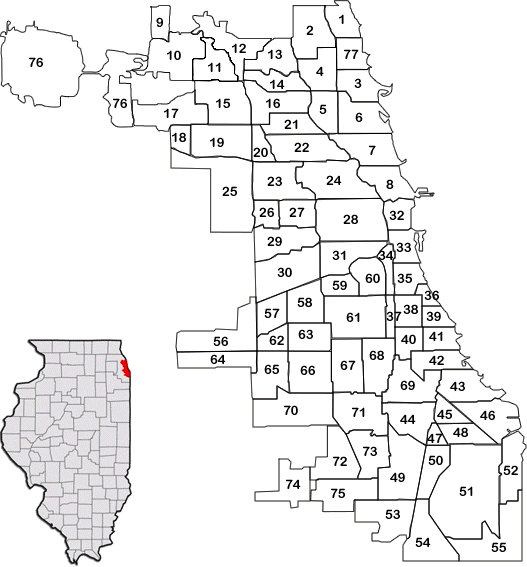
Community areas of Chicago (12th street is the border between area 32 and area 33).

1700 East 56th Street, also known as 1700 Building, is a 40-story luxury apartment building overlooking Lake Michigan and adjacent to Jackson Park and the Museum of Science and Industry in the Hyde Park neighborhood of Chicago in Cook County, Illinois, United States. Designed by Loewenberg Architects, its construction was completed in 1968, followed by a condominium conversion in 1994. With 369 residences, this was the largest Hyde Park condominium conversion in a decade, when a recession and soaring interest rates halted Chicago's condo conversion frenzy.

This is the tallest building in Chicago south of 13th Street.

The condominium conversion had five different unit designs, each named after a famous Chicago architect:

- The Adler, a 569-square-foot (52.9 m^{2}) studio unit
- The Burnham, a 793-square-foot (73.7 m^{2})1-bedroom, 1-bath unit
- The Sullivan, a 1,166-square-foot (108.3 m^{2}), a 2-bedroom, 2-bath unit
- The Mies van der Rohe, a 1,263-square-foot (117.3 m^{2}) corner 2-bedroom, 2-bath unit
- the Wright, a 1,648-square-foot (153.1 m^{2}) corner 3-bedroom, 3-bath unit
