= Baskerville Apartment Building =

- U.S. National Register of Historic Places
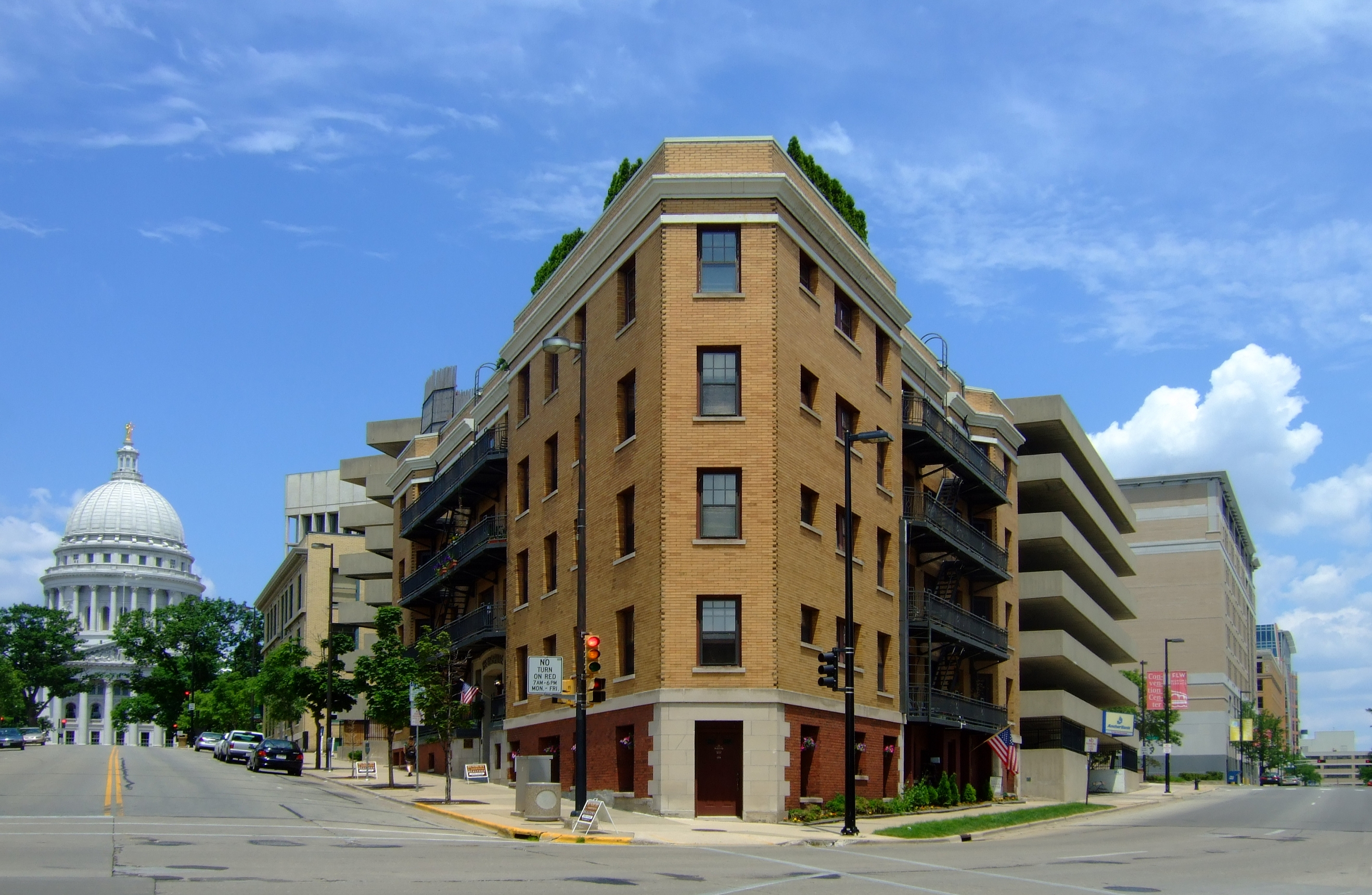
- Baskerville Apartment Building
- Location: 121-129 S. Hamilton St. Madison, Wisconsin
- Coordinates: 43.07215°N 89.38402°W
- Built: 1913–1914
- Architect: Robert L. Wright
- Architectural style: Classical Revival
- NRHP reference No.: 88002006
- Added to NRHP: October 13, 1988

The Baskerville Apartment Building is an early apartment building constructed in 1913 in Madison, Wisconsin, United States, two blocks south of the capitol. In 1988 it was added to the National Register of Historic Places.

== History ==
Around 1900, the population of Madison was growing rapidly, driven by the expansion of the University, government, and industry. Many people couldn't drive in to work from outside the downtown because automobiles weren't yet common. Around 1910, developers started constructing small apartment buildings to address the increasing demand for housing in downtown areas. By building vertically, apartment buildings were able to accommodate multiple families within the same space typically occupied by one or two single-family homes. This surge in apartment construction continued throughout the 1920s and into the 1930s.

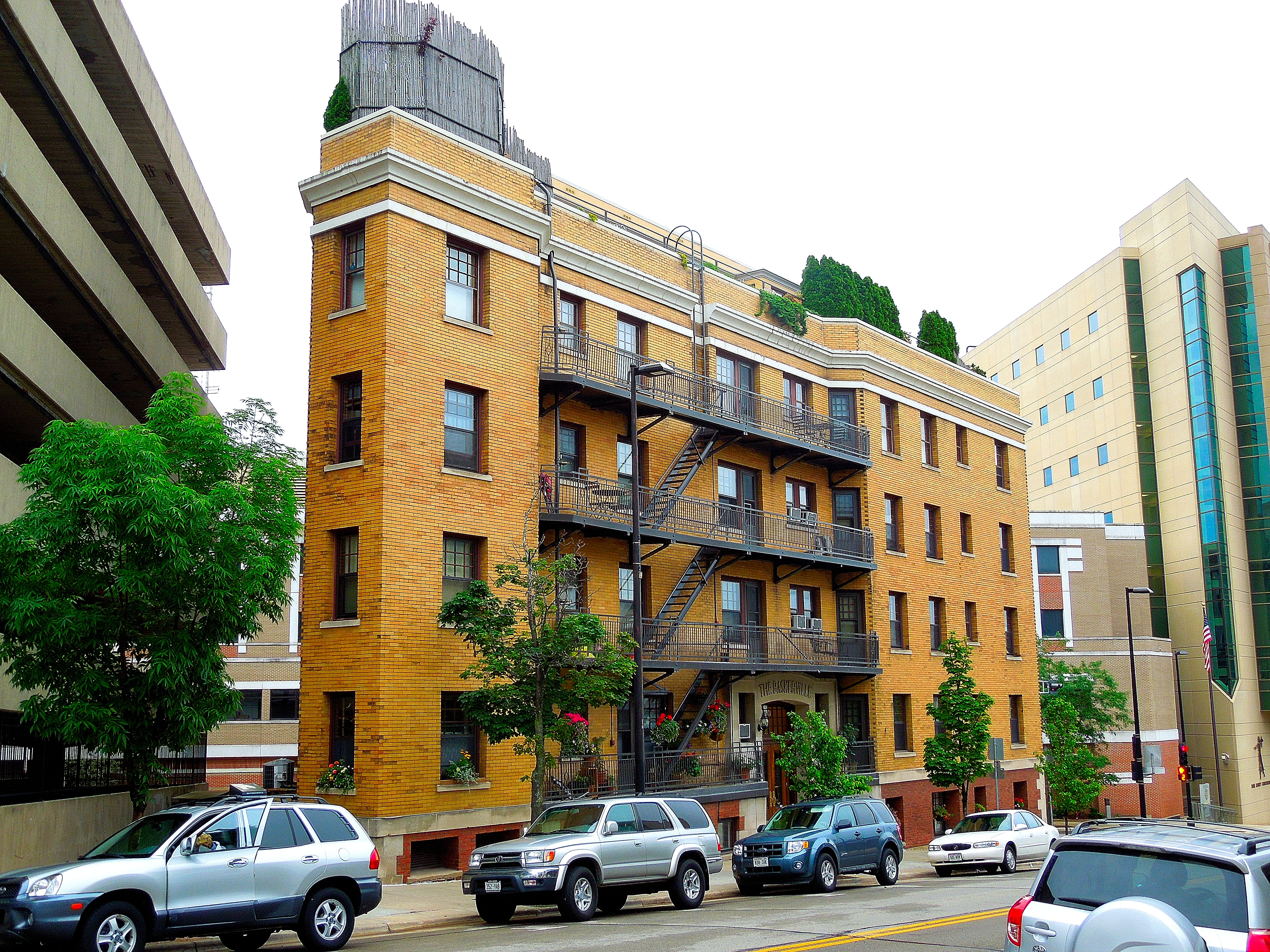

Built in 1913-14, the Baskerville falls early in this boom, and it is rather large among the early apartment buildings. It was designed by Madison architect Richard L. Wright to fit the wedge-shaped parcel where S. Hamilton St meets W. Doty. The building stands four stories tall on a raised, red brick foundation. Exterior walls are tan brick, topped with a simple Neoclassical-styled cornice. A section of each street-facing side is recessed to make space for balconies with iron balustrades. In one of these recesses is the main entrance - double-doors with sidelights and transom, framed in concrete with "The Baskerville" inscribed above.

Inside is a vestibule paneled in marble. Common areas beyond that include woodwork stained dark and a few decorative columns. Each floor of the building featured six apartments, with most units consisting of a living room, a bedroom, a galley kitchen, and a bathroom. The layout and dimensions of the apartments varied slightly to accommodate the building's triangular shape. The basement initially housed two flats, along with a storage room, a boiler room, and a laundry area. The total cost to construct the building was approximately $50,000.

Robert Wright had worked for Gordon & Paunack and Claude & Starck of Madison. In 1909 he started his own architecture practice. Surviving buildings from before the Baskerville are the 1909 Prairie Style City Market, the 1912 Prairie-style bungalows at 405 Sidney St and 406 Sidney St, After the Baskerville are the 1914 Prairie School Harley house at 1909 Vilas Ave and the 1916 Haseltine bungalow at 18 Jane St. in Mazomanie.

In addition to the NRHP listing, the Baskerville was also designated a landmark by the Madison Landmarks Commission in 1992 and is listed on the Wisconsin State Register of Historic Places. The building is now a condominium community.
