= Peabody Court Apartments =

- U.S. National Register of Historic Places
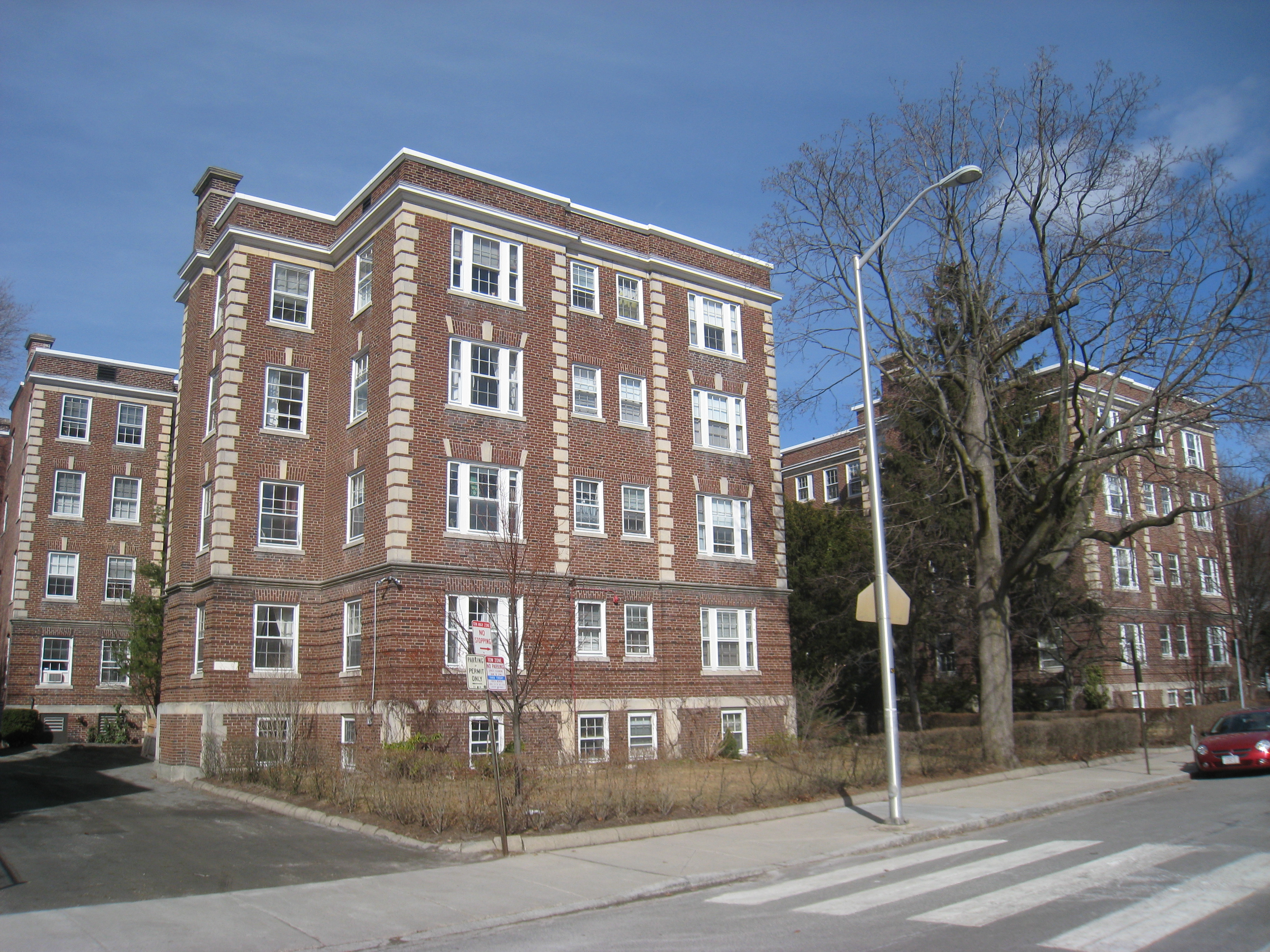

- Location within Massachusetts Location within the United States
- Location: Cambridge, Massachusetts
- Coordinates: 42°23′1″N 71°7′27″W
- Area: 1.1 acres (0.45 ha)
- Built: 1922
- Architect: Harlow, H.
- Architectural style: Colonial Revival
- MPS: Cambridge MRA
- NRHP reference No.: 86001312
- Added to NRHP: May 19, 1986

The Peabody Court Apartments are a historic apartment building at 41-43 Linnaean Street in Cambridge, Massachusetts. The four story Colonial Revival brick building was built in 1922 and designed by architect Hamilton Harlow. The H-shaped building has deep courtyards, and is trimmed with limestone elements, including corner quoins, window sills, and keystone lintels. It is a well-preserved example of a courtyard apartment block, a style popularized in 1898 by Ralph Adams Cram.

The building was listed on the National Register of Historic Places in 1986.

== See also ==
- National Register of Historic Places listings in Cambridge, Massachusetts
