= Park Place Tower =

Condominium building in Chicago, Illinois

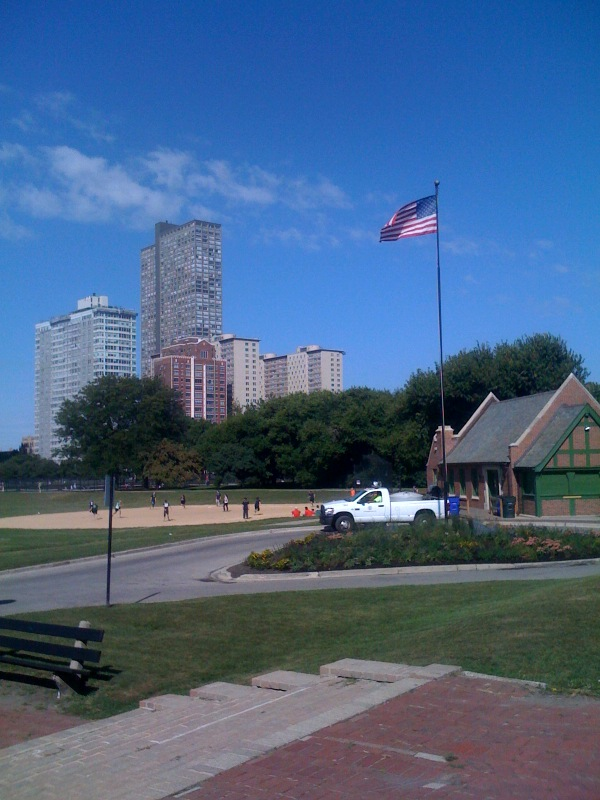
- Park Place Tower seen from Lincoln Park and Irving Park road

General information
- Status: Completed
- Location: 655 W. Irving Park Rd. Chicago, IL 60613
- Coordinates: 41.9546°N 87.6475°W
- Completed: 1971

Park Place Tower is located at 655 West Irving Park Road, Chicago, Illinois and is a 56-story, 901-unit condominium tower located in the Lakeview neighborhood in the north side of Chicago. Park Place Tower is the tallest building in Illinois outside of downtown Chicago. Park Place Tower is one of the largest residential towers in Chicago at 530.5 feet (161.7 m).

== Construction and renovation ==
The tower was initially built in 1971. The entire building was completely renovated and converted to a condominium building in a multi-million dollar project that lasted from 2001 until 2006.

== See also ==
- List of tallest buildings in Chicago
