= Elysées Condominiums =

Condominium building in Chicago, Illinois

Coordinates: 41.8980°N 87.6252°W

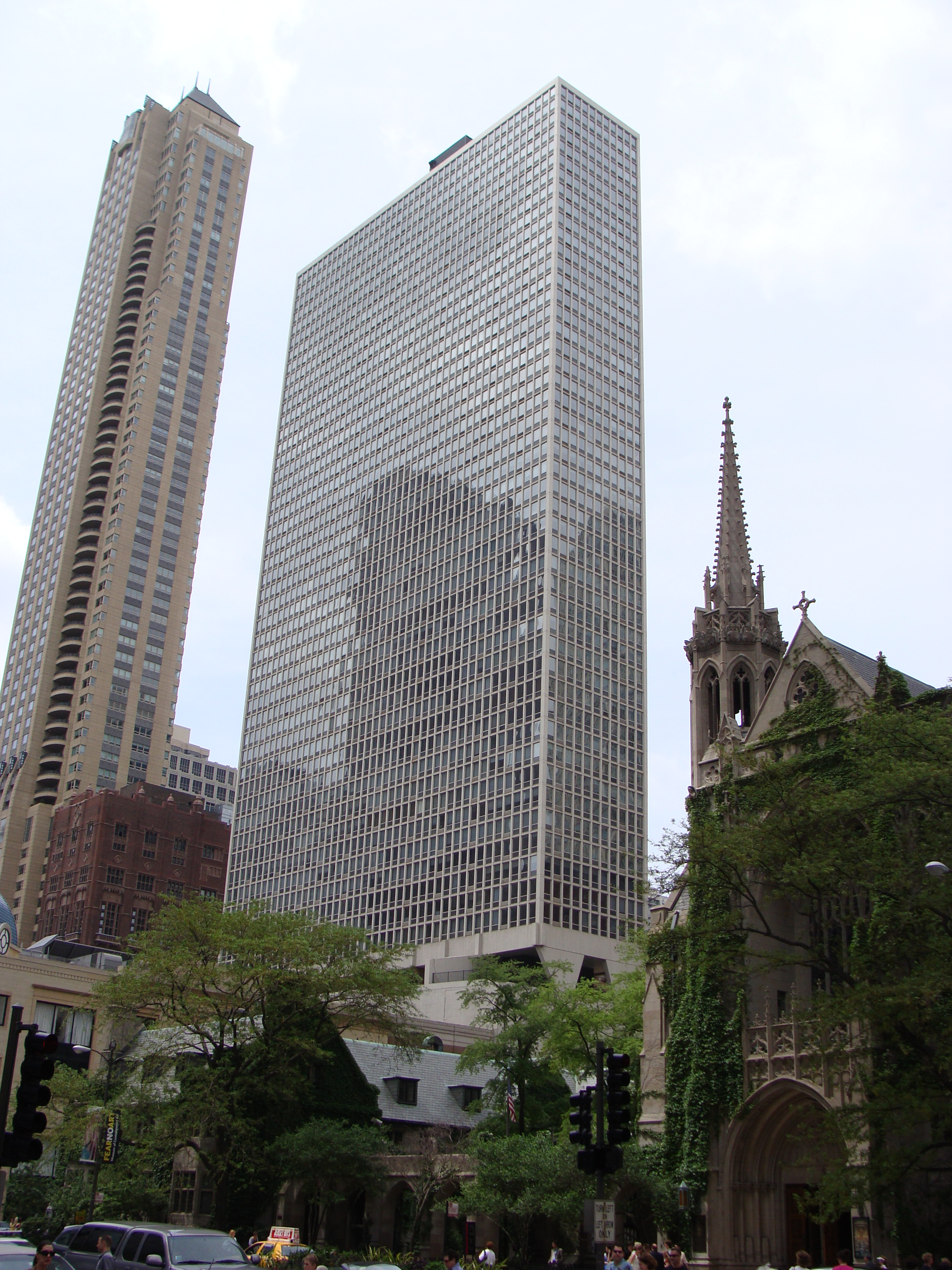
- Interactive map of the Elysées Condominiums area

General information
- Type: Residential
- Location: 111 East Chestnut Street, Chicago, Illinois
- Construction started: 1971
- Completed: 1972

Height
- Roof: 529 ft (161 m)

Technical details
- Floor count: 56

Design and construction
- Architects: Solomon, Cordwell, Buenz and Associates

Elysées Condominiums is a 529 ft (161m) tall skyscraper in Chicago, Illinois. It was built from 1971 to 1972 and has 56 floors. Solomon, Cordwell, Buenz and Associates designed the building, which is the 69th tallest in Chicago.

== See also ==
- List of tallest buildings in Chicago
- 111 East Chestnut Condo Neighbor Blog
