= Toscano (Miami) =

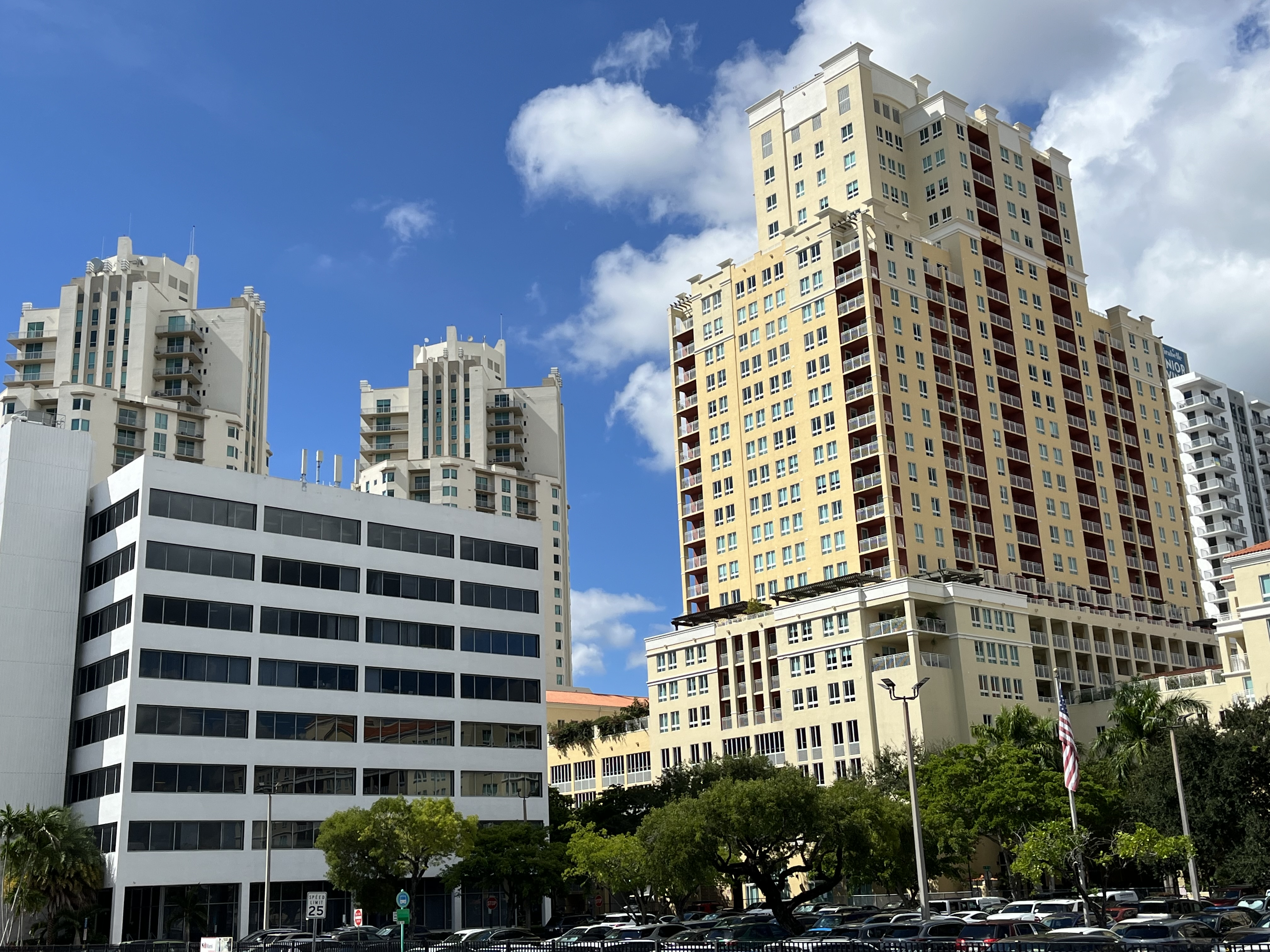
- Interactive map of the Toscano area

General information
- Status: Completed
- Type: Residential condominiums, retail (street level)
- Location: 7350 S.W. 89th Street, Miami, Florida, 33156; United States
- Coordinates: 25.687927°N 80.31454°W
- Construction started: 2004
- Completed: 2007

Height
- Roof: 280 ft (85.3 m)

Technical details
- Floor count: 25

Design and construction
- Architects: Nichols Brosch Wurst Wolf & Associates
- Developer: Fairfield Residential, LLC

Toscano (formerly known as Dadeland Fairfield) is a group of residential condos in the Dadeland neighborhood of Miami, Florida, United States. Toscano consists of two connected residential structures; Toscano North Tower, a low-rise building and Toscano South Tower, a high rise tower to the south. The south tower is 280 ft tall with retail space at street level and also contains the main lobby for both buildings. The street level of the north tower consist almost entirely of retail space currently occupied by Rooms To Go. The remaining six floors are exclusively residential condo units. Construction took three years (2004-2007) to complete both buildings. The north tower was completed in 2006 and the south tower was completed in 2007.
