= Carnegie Hill Tower =

Residential skyscraper in Manhattan, New York

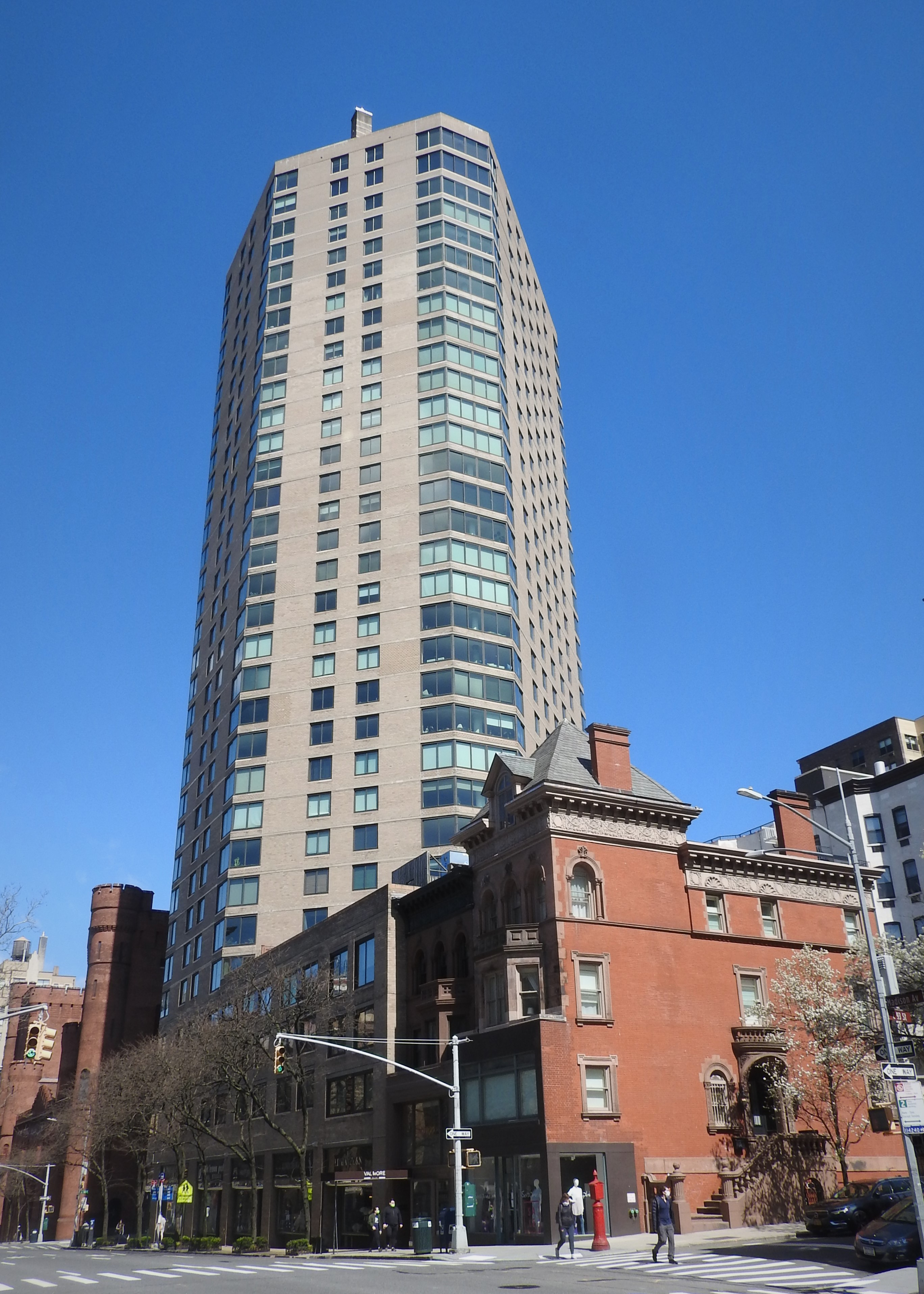
- Carnegie Hill Tower
- Interactive map of the Carnegie Hill Tower area

General information
- Type: Condominium
- Location: 40 East 94th Street, Manhattan, New York, United States
- Coordinates: 40°47′8.36″N 73°57′17.84″W
- Completed: 1983

Technical details
- Floor count: 32

Design and construction
- Developer: Frederick DeMatteis and Charles Shaw
- Other designers: Edward V. Giannasca

Carnegie Hill Tower is a 32-story condominium building at 40 East 94th Street on the Upper East Side of Manhattan in New York City.

The building was designed by Edward V. Giannasca on behalf of developers Frederick DeMatteis and Charles Shaw and completed in 1983. The building is known for its waterfall that extends to 93rd Street and extensively landscaped mews.
