= Carolina On The Hill =

Carolina on the Hill
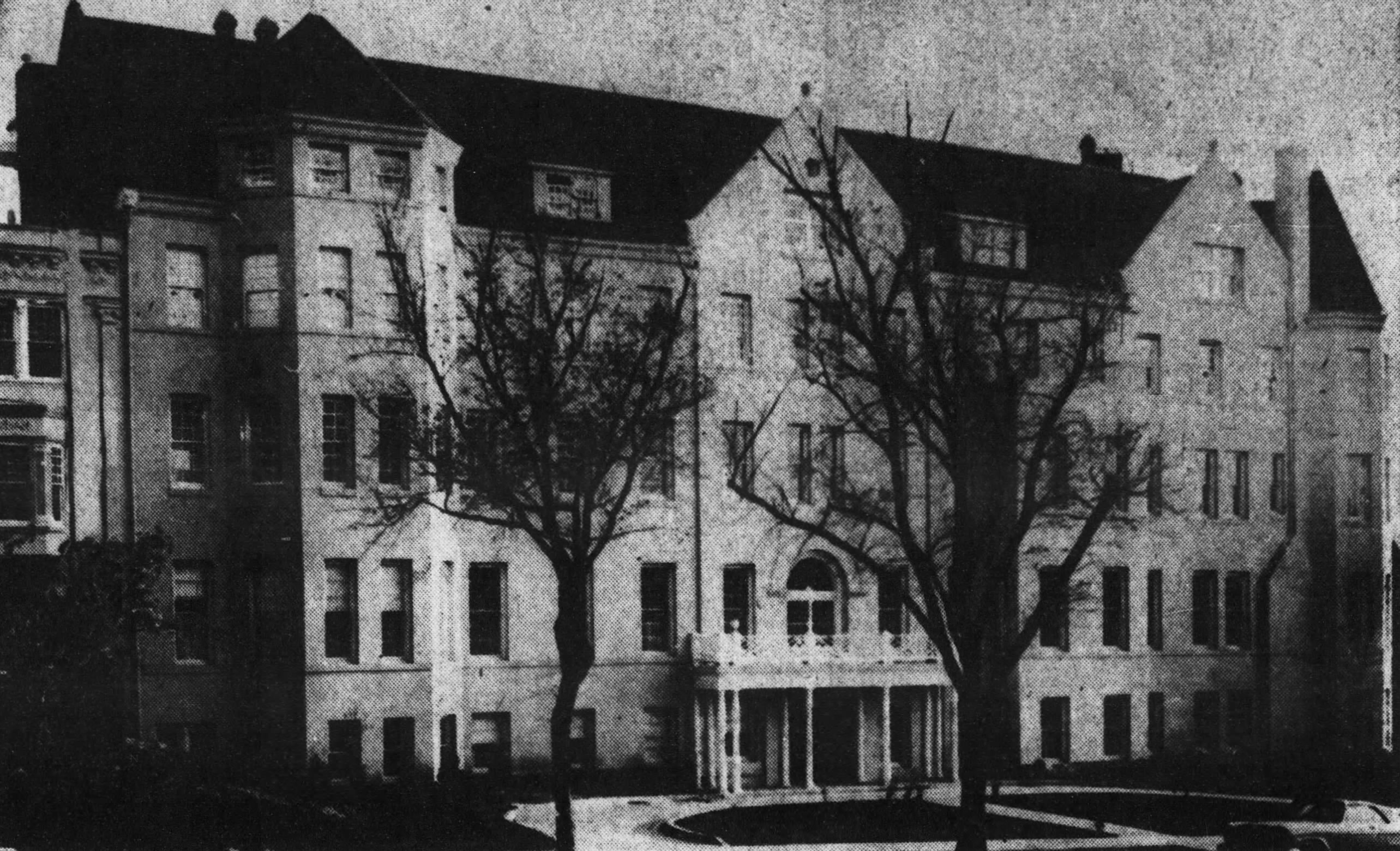
- The building in 1960

General information
- Architectural style: Modern Gothic
- Address: 101 North Carolina Avenue
- Town or city: Washington, D.C.
- Country: United States
- Coordinates: 38.8835°N 77.0050°W
- Groundbreaking: March 21, 1900
- Inaugurated: October 14, 1900

Technical details
- Floor count: 5

Design and construction
- Architect(s): L. Norris

Carolina On The Hill is a historic condominium building located on Capitol Hill in Washington, D.C.

The building was formerly used by the Sisters of Mercy religious order as a residential building called St. Catherine's Home.

== Site ==
The building is at 101 North Carolina Avenue in Capitol Hill, occupying the intersection of North Carolina Avenue, East Street, 1st Street, and New Jersey Avenue, in a plot which was once part of Garfield Park. According to the original building plans, it has a frontage of 148 ft (45 m) on North Carolina Avenue to the north, 131 ft (40 m) on East Street, and 40 ft (12 m) on the east and west sides.

During the 1900s, it was in close proximity to several streetcar lines.

The building is located within the Capitol Hill Historic District, which was added to the National Register of Historic Places in 1976.

== Architecture ==
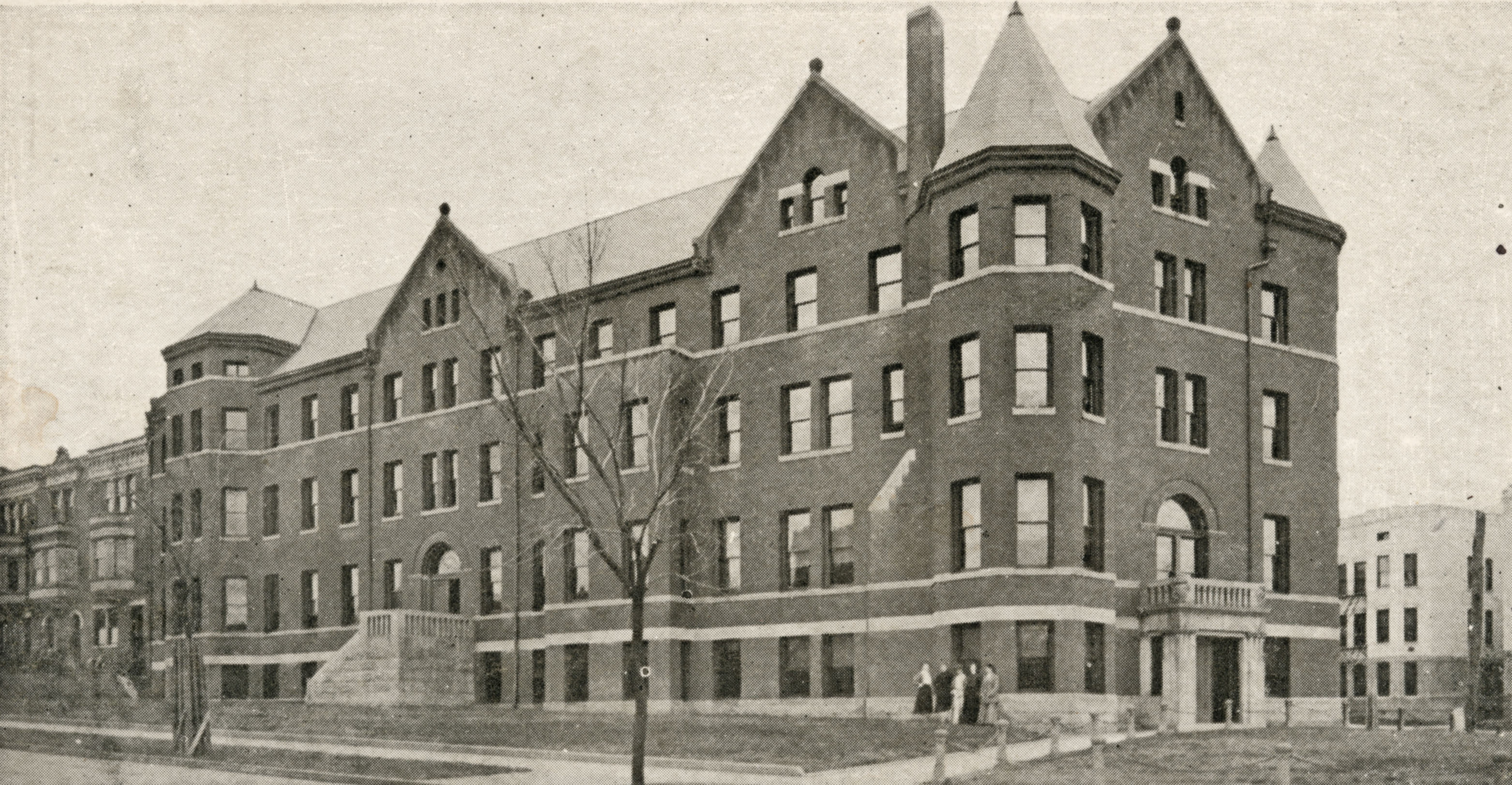
The building in 1909, showing the main entrance on the right and the side entrance stairs on the left.

The building's original design was created by L. Norris and it was built by John S. Larcombe. It has five stories including a basement and an attic. There were a total of 74 rooms present in the building, 65 of which were bedrooms.

It was designed in a Modern Gothic style with red bricks and stone trimmings. The fronts are broken with bay projections which continue into a partially-gabled roof. The original main entrance was located on the New Jersey Avenue side, and was constructed from carved white sandstone.

The original design of the building included parking space on two sides of the building.

=== Original interior ===
In its original function as a boarding home and religious institute for the Sisters of Mercy, the main entrance of the building opened onto a long corridor with a cement floor. To the left of this was a dining hall which ran along the entire length of the building on the North Carolina Avenue side and had nine large windows. Also present on this floor was the refectory, furnace room and several small rooms used for preparing food. The building's kitchen was a one-storey structure which opened onto the exterior courtyard and each floor contained fully-plumbed bathrooms.

A number of bedrooms for women residents were located on the second floor of the building, on either side of a long hallway. A side entrance was located on the North Carolina Avenue side of the building to allow ease of access to the residents.

The third floor was used by the Sisters of Mercy for residential and religious purposes. After walking upstairs near the back end of the building, a hallway on the right led to the bedrooms and communal rooms belonging to the sisters. The hallway leading left went towards the chapel, where the vestry rooms and apartments for clergy were located through a small doorway behind the altar. A new marble altar was gifted to the home in 1901.

On the fourth floor, there were 28 rooms for residents, with the building having room for 46 residents upon construction. This floor also contained a small staircase that led to the attic room.

=== 1960s renovation ===
In 1960, the building was redesigned by John M. Hallett and built by Elmer L. Klavans. After the remodelling project, it had 14 one bedroom units and 24 studio apartments.

Hallett's redesign left the building's roof and exterior walls intact, but the latter were painted a light beige color. The main entrance was relocated to the bottom floor of the building on the North Carolina Avenue side. Muntins were added to the windows and they were reglazed with small panes at a cost of around $5,000. Private gardens were created for four of the apartments and balconies were created for another two.

The interior of the building was drastically changed, although a few hall partitions and the floor levels remained the same. Work carried out on the building included the creation of new bathrooms, kitchens, lighting fixtures, heating and air conditioning, wood flooring, and a lobby.

== History ==
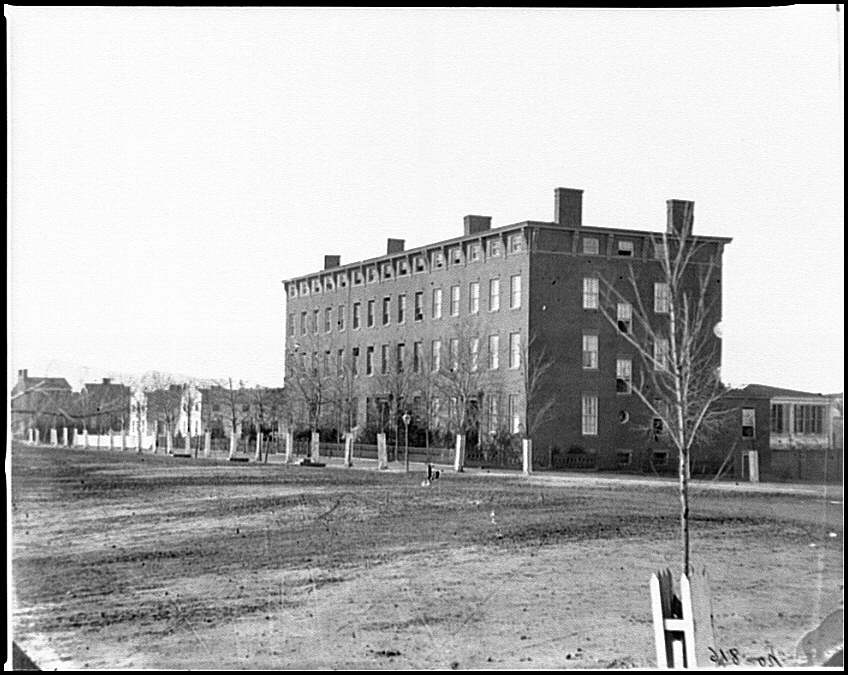
The Douglas Hospital building in 1864

The Sisters of Mercy religious order was founded in 1831 in Ireland by Catherine McAuley as a way for religious sisters to promote education and health care through Catholic principles. In 1852, a group of the Sisters of Mercy from Pittsburgh began working in the Archdiocese of Baltimore (which then encompassed the District of Columbia) and operated the Washington Infirmary hospital. The community separated from Pittsburgh in 1858 and the new Baltimore Community maintained operation of the Infirmary. Following an 1861 fire at the Infirmary and the outbreak of the American Civil War, the sisters were given control of the Douglas Hospital, a military hospital housed in the former residences of politician Stephen Arnold Douglas.

In 1894, the Sisters of Mercy began renting the building at 222 North Capitol Street in Washington and operating it as a women's residential home under the name Institute of Our Lady of Mercy. It was formerly the home of the Elliott family, and was picked due to its close proximity to government buildings. By December 1899, the Sisters were located at 310 East Capitol Street and were planning for the construction of a new building for the home on North Carolina Avenue.

=== St. Catherine's Home ===
Work began on the St. Catherine's Home project on March 21, 1900, when a small group of sisters and prominent Catholic citizens gathered to break the ground on the site. Construction of the building cost around $80,000 and was finished later that year. At a ceremony on October 14, 1900, Cardinal James Gibbons blessed the building with holy water and prayer. By then, the institute had already filled 40 of its 46 beds. Alongside residence, the Sisters of Mercy offered those staying at the home opportunities to develop their education and employability: they planned to host reading circles and connect unemployed women with local employers.

As early as April 1905, the home was facing overcrowding and efforts were made to turn sections of corridor into further bedrooms. Further accommodation was secured in the late 1910s through the purchase of a nearby building, with a covered walkway connecting the two residences. There were 85 people resident in the home by 1921.

=== Building renovation ===
During the early 1960s, the building ceased to be the site of St. Catherine's Home and was converted into a 48-unit apartment building.
