= One Fifty One at Biscayne =

- Interactive map of the One Fifty One at Biscayne area

General information
- Type: Residential
- Location: 14951 and 15051 Royal Oaks Lane, North Miami, Florida
- Coordinates: 25.909002°N 80.153139°W
- Construction started: 2007
- Completed: 2008
- Opening: 2008

Height
- Roof: 250 ft (76 m)

Technical details
- Floor count: 25

Design and construction
- Architect: BC Architects AIA
- Developer: Swerdlow Group/Boca Developers
- Main contractor: Gryphon Construction

One Fifty One at Biscayne is a residential property in North Miami, FL, that consists of 373 condominiums in two 25-story towers. The residential development was formerly named The Oaks at Biscayne Landing.

The property is bordered to the east by the Biscayne Bay campus of Florida International University and David Lawrence Jr. K-8 Center, and to the west by commercial developments along Biscayne Boulevard. The property is named for its location at the intersection of that roadway and Northeast 151st Street.

In 2007, Boca Developers constructed the towers in the first phase of what was planned to be a larger mixed-use development, Biscayne Landing. The company's lender filed foreclosure action in 2009 and no other buildings were constructed. The project went into bankruptcy.

That same year, iStar Residential, a division of iStar Financial, purchased 160 of the unsold residences and leased a majority of them while the South Florida real estate market was in recovery. In late 2013, the homeowners association renamed the towers as One Fifty One at Biscayne.

Also in late 2013, iStar Residential hired DevStar Realty, a wholly owned subsidiary of The DevStar Group, to manage repositioning and sales. Dev Star Group principals had turned around two other local condominium projects — Paramount Bay in Miami and Ocean House on South Beach. The units at One Fifty One at Biscayne consist of two-bedroom residences of 1,600 to almost 1,800 square feet and three-bedroom residences of 2,000 to almost 2,400 square feet.

During the periods of foreclosure and bankruptcy, the residential property stayed open with minimal maintenance. Under new ownership, iStar Residential is adding several million dollars' worth of amenities and improvements. They include a 24-hour attended guardhouse with an advanced security system and the addition of a brand new pool, clubhouse, tennis court and fitness center with locker rooms.
