= 353 Central Park West =

Residential skyscraper in Manhattan, New York

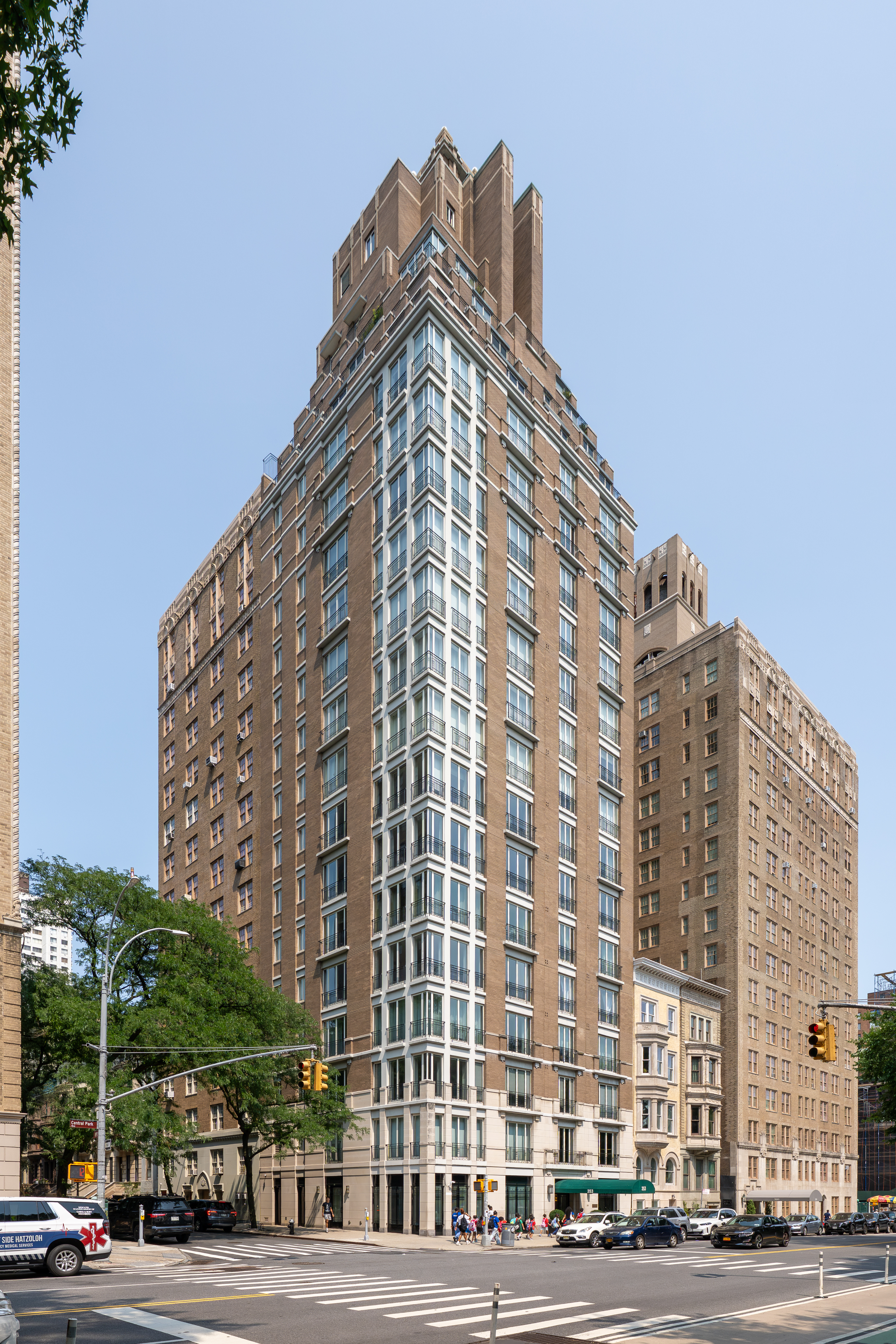
- (2026)
- Interactive map of the 353 Central Park West area

General information
- Type: Condominium
- Architectural style: Prewar
- Location: 353 Central Park West, New York, New York, United States
- Coordinates: 40.7913°N 73.9653°W
- Current tenants: c. 16-32 tenants
- Construction started: 1992
- Completed: 1992

Height
- Height: 230 feet (70 m)

Technical details
- Structural system: Skyscraper
- Floor count: 19 (16 apartments)
- Lifts/elevators: 2

Design and construction
- Architects: Yorancioglu Architects and The Vilkas Group

353 Central Park West is an apartment building on the Upper West Side of Manhattan, New York City. It is located at the corner of Central Park West and West 95th Street.

The 19-story building with setbacks was built in 1992. 353 Central Park West is one of the few residential buildings in the city whose top is illuminated at night. It is also one of the few residential buildings in the city whose pinnacle has active light fixtures.

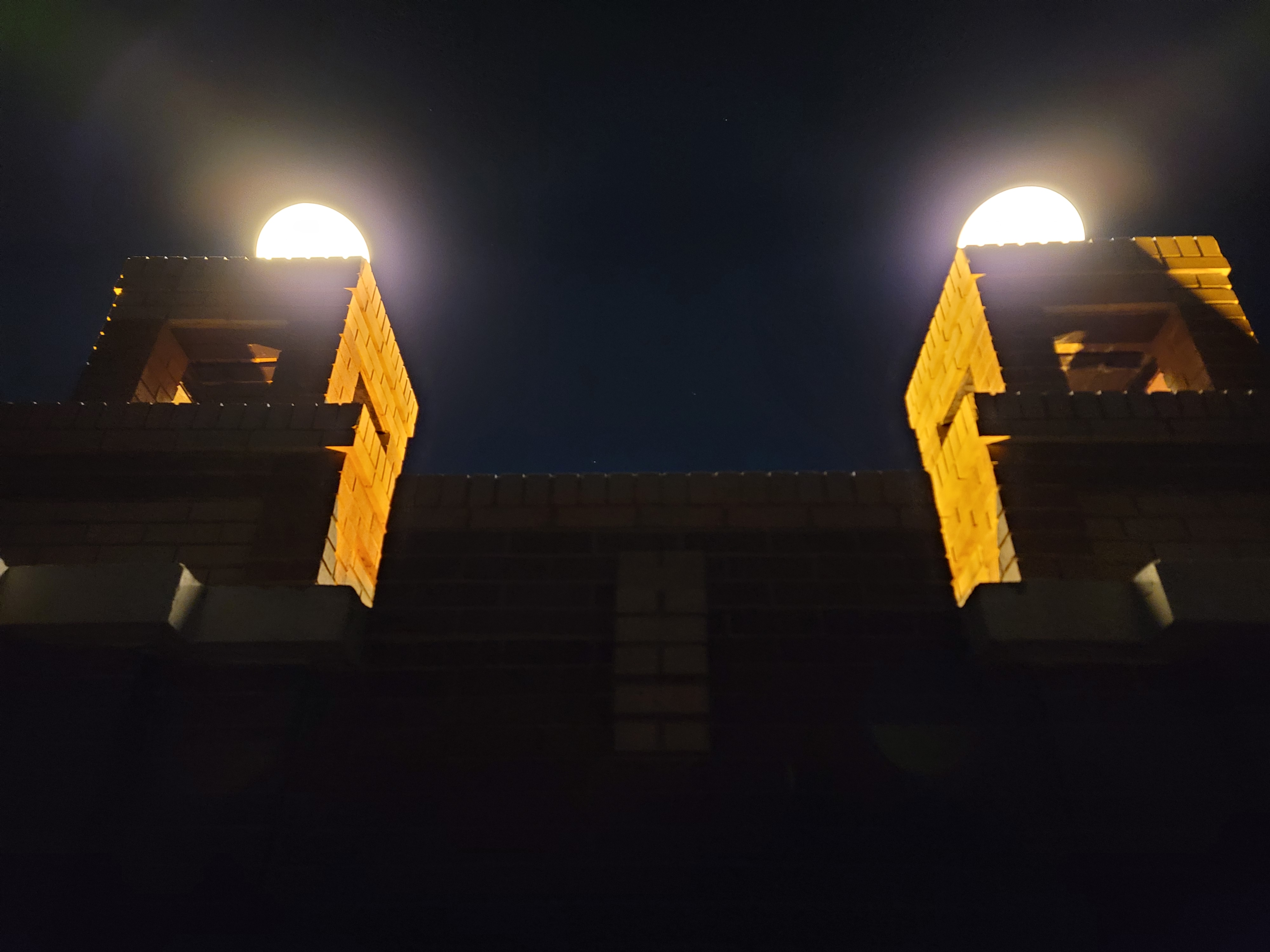
The pinnacle of 353 Central Park West. Only two of the four light fixtures that make up the pinnacle height of the building are pictured.
