= One Thousand Ocean =

General information
- Location: Boca Raton, Florida; United States
- Coordinates: 26.33673°N 80.07168°W
- Opening: 2010

Design and construction
- Architects: Garcia Stromberg, RTKL, EDSA
- Developer: An Affiliate of LXR Luxury Resorts & Hotels

Website
- Official Website

One Thousand Ocean is a 52 unit condominium located in Boca Raton, Florida which opened in 2010. Boca Raton is located in South Florida, 30 minutes south of Palm Beach and less than an hour north of Miami. One Thousand Ocean, adjacent to the Boca Raton Resort, is on the southernmost point of a peninsula, surrounded by the Boca Inlet, Intracoastal Waterway and the Atlantic Ocean. One Thousand Ocean is a seven-story building containing residences priced from $3 to more than $15 million. Residence types range from one-story, penthouses and one- and two-story beach villas, which average about 4,000 square feet each. One Thousand Ocean residents are allowed access to the club at the Boca Raton Resort, which includes a 32-slip marina, seven pools and three fitness centers.

One Thousand Ocean was featured on the popular HGTV show, Selling New York, in Season 3, Episode 10 "Sales Partners, NYC Brokers Team up to Make Deals Happen" which aired on August 11, 2011. In addition, Jennifer Lopez and Jason Statham recently shot scenes at One Thousand Ocean for an upcoming movie, “Parker,” which is set to open in the fall of 2012. Finally, V*Starr Interiors, owned by Venus Williams, is designing a model in One Thousand Ocean.
