= City Market (Madison, Wisconsin) =

- U.S. National Register of Historic Places
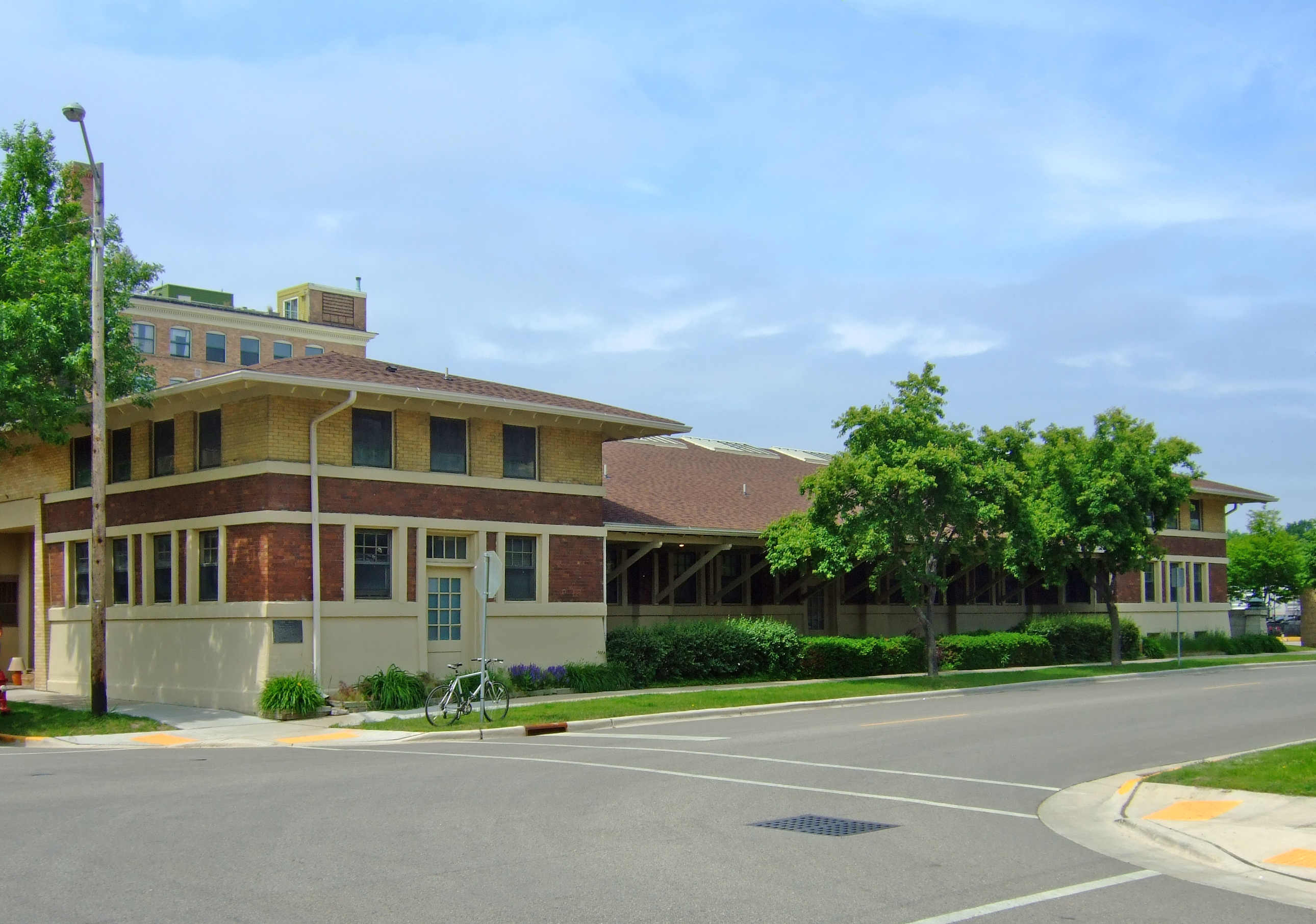
- City Market
- Location: 101 N. Blount St. Madison, Wisconsin
- Coordinates: 43.081°N 89.378°W
- Built: 1909
- Architect: Robert L. Wright
- Architectural style: Prairie School
- NRHP reference No.: 78000085
- Added to NRHP: November 28, 1978

Madison's City Market was built in 1909 as a city-owned enclosed farmers' market a half mile northeast of the capitol. It was designed in Prairie Style by Robert Wright. In 1978 it was added to the National Register of Historic Places.

== History ==
Before 1909 farmers would bring their vegetables into Madison and set up stands here and there along the streets. Some considered this mode of commerce an unsightly nuisance. At that time the City Beautiful movement was sweeping parts of the country, aiming to provide pleasant public parks and facilities to uplift all residents, including the lower classes.

In 1909 the city of Madison approved building a structure to bring the scattered vendors together in one organized space. Madison architect Robert Wright designed the building with an I-shaped footprint, with the Prairie School's emphasis on the horizontal seen in its low-pitched roof, wide eaves, and horizontal coursing. The roof was originally covered in green tile. Where the garage doors are now, carriage house-style doors originally allowed farmers to pull their wagon through so that they could unload their produce under cover. The structure cost $14,000 to build and the Wisconsin State Journal described it as the "most artistic piece of property owned by the city."

Not everyone was for the new city market. When some called it "socialistic", Mayor Joseph C. Schubert replied "if bringing government closer to the needs of the people was socialistic it was just what the people were entitled to." Despite this defense and despite City Market's aesthetics, it didn't serve as a market for long. Many farmers preferred to sell in other places and by the 1920s the market was being used as a dance hall and teen center, and later as a garage by the streets department.

In 1977, the building was designated a landmark by the Madison Landmarks Commission. The following year it was added to the NRHP as an early representative of civic improvement in Madison and as a rather rare example of Prairie School architecture in a public building. It has since been remodeled into apartments by the Alexander Company.
