= Key Colony (condominium) =

Gated community on Key Biscayne, Florida

Coordinates: 25°41′50″N 80°9′34″W

Located adjacent to the Atlantic Ocean, the Key Colony complex is a gated community of four independently operated condominiums located on Key Biscayne, Florida. The four buildings, Botanica, EmeraldBay, Tidemark, and Oceansound, were constructed in the 1970s and 1980s and are one of the larger complexes on the island. There are about 1,200 units. The complex features a private beach, tennis courts, and swimming pools. There is a small retail center within the complex, as well as a public shopping center, Key Colony Plaza, that is adjacent to the complex.

The complex is notable for its expanse—more than 50 acres (200,000 m^{2})—its unusual architectural design, and for its contribution to the history of development on the island of Key Biscayne—projects that have been the subject of citizen initiatives to limit further development on the island.

== Architectural and landscape design ==
The Key Colony complex has won numerous awards from professional groups for its architectural and landscaping design, which blends its seaside location with tropical flora. Awards include the National Association of Home Builders Grand Award (1980), The Florida Nurserymen and Growers Association (six awards between 1982 and 1983), and two awards from the American Society of Landscape Architects (1982 and 1983).

== History ==
The complex was the brainchild of developer Fritz Scharenberg, who paid to bring out a new water main from the Miami mainland to accommodate the project at a cost of $1.8 million in 1977. For three of the buildings, Scharenberg specified a "pyramid" design, on a 32-degree slope, to maximize privacy between floors. The fourth building, Botanica, was designed to integrate a living garden intertwined among the residential units.
