= Altadena Apartments =

Building in Salt Lake City, Utah, U.S.

- U.S. National Register of Historic Places
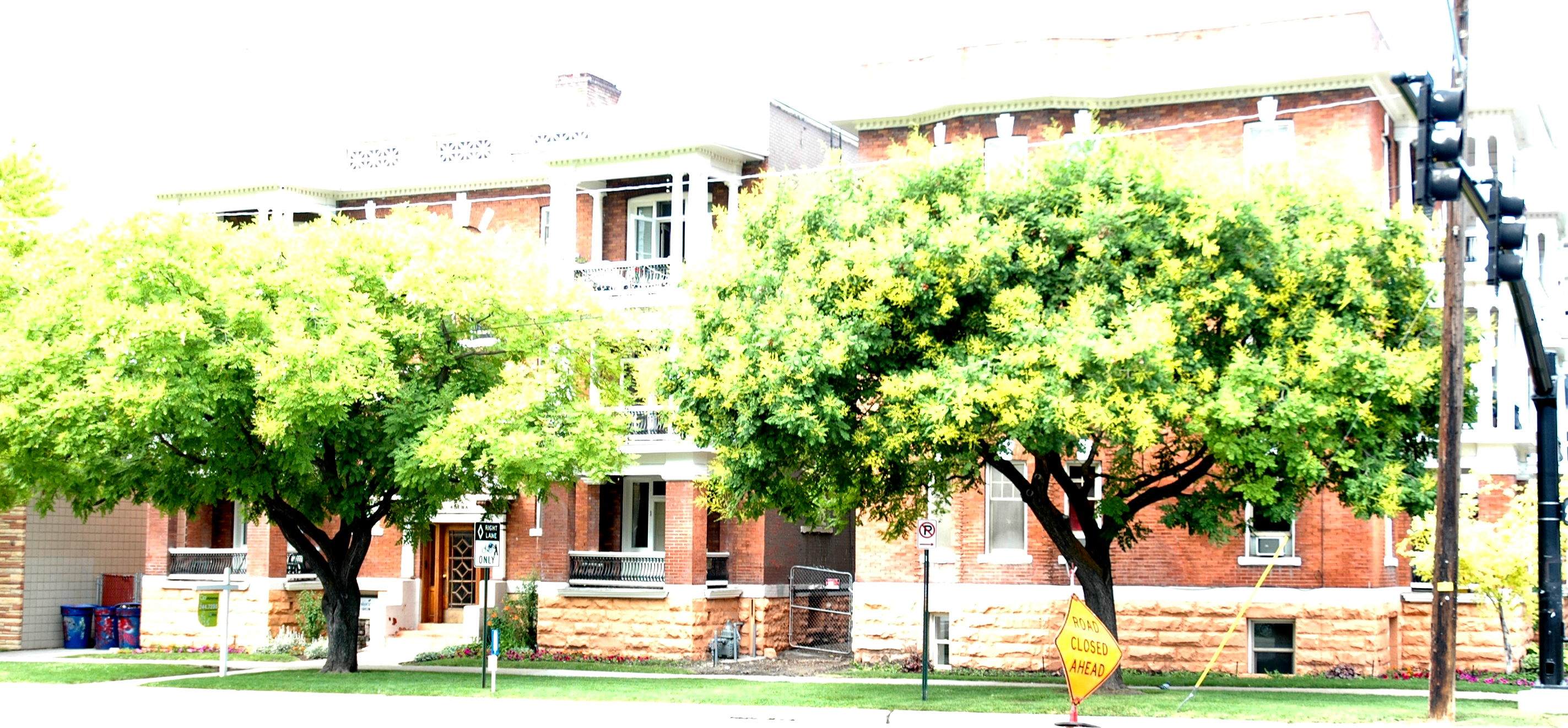

- Location within Utah Location within the United States
- Location: 310 S. 300 E., Salt Lake City, Utah
- Coordinates: 40°45′44″N 111°52′55″W
- Area: 0.2 acres (0.081 ha)
- Built: 1906
- Architect: Rudine, August
- Architectural style: Classical Revival, Walk-Up Apartment Block
- MPS: Salt Lake City MPS
- NRHP reference No.: 09001291
- Added to NRHP: January 27, 2010

The Altadena Apartments in Salt Lake City, Utah, which includes the Altadena Flats and the Sampson Altadena Condominiums, were built in 1905 or 1906 by the Octavius Sampson family at cost of $21,000. The building has Tuscan columns, pediments, and dentillated cornices.

The buildings were deemed significant for association with the urbanization of Salt Lake City in the early 20th century. The property consists of the three-story brick Classical Revival-style Altadena Apartments and an associated building, the Sampson Apartments. These were "early examples from this period of apartment construction, during which time the typical apartment block was a three-story walk-up with two units on each floor flanking a central staircase. The Altadena and Sampson apartment blocks standout as high-end architectural representatives of the property type."

The property was listed on the National Register of Historic Places in 2010.
