= Grand Plaza I =

Apartment building in Chicago, Illinois

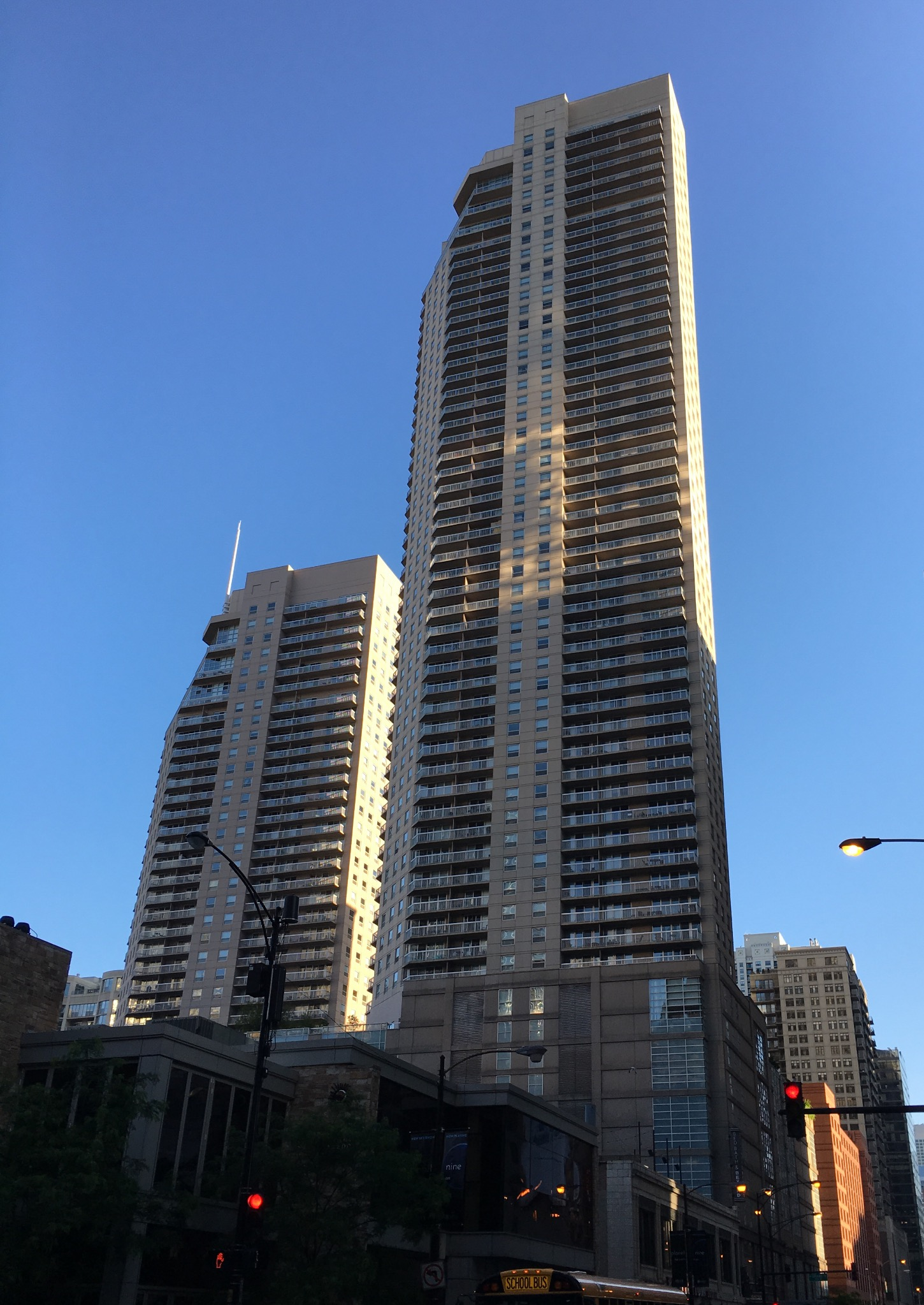

- Location within Chicago metropolitan area

General information
- Type: Residential
- Location: 540 North State Street, Chicago, Illinois, United States
- Coordinates: 41°53′31″N 87°37′43″W
- Completed: 2003

Height
- Roof: 560 ft (170 m)

Technical details
- Floor count: 57

Design and construction
- Architects: Loewenberg + Associates / OWP&P Architects

Grand Plaza is a residential apartment building in Chicago, Illinois, United States. The 57 story building was completed in 2003 at a height of 641 feet (195 m) when measured from its decorative spires. Grand Plaza I is one of the tallest all-residential buildings in Chicago and contains 481 luxury apartment units. Until July 1, 2008, it was the tallest building in the Chicago ZIP Code 60610, the ZIP Code with the most high-rises in the city. On July 1, 2008, the building ended up being in a new ZIP Code: 60654. That ZIP Code encompasses a small area, so the building is still the tallest in its ZIP Code.

Phase two of the Grand Plaza complex was The Residences at Grand Plaza, completed in the same year. At 39 floors, it is the shorter of the two twin towers and is now a condominium building.

Both buildings were designed by Loewenberg + Associates and OWP&P Architects. They also share a common base full of retail such as a Jewel-Osco supermarket.

== See also ==
- List of skyscrapers
- List of tallest buildings in the United States
- List of tallest buildings in Chicago
- World's tallest structures
