= Waterfront Tower =

Coordinates: 38°52′38.71″N 77°0′55.92″W

- Interactive map of the Waterfront Tower area

General information
- Type: Condominium
- Location: 1101 3rd Street SW, Washington D.C., United States
- Topped-out: 1960
- Renovated: 2009

Technical details
- Floor count: 9

Design and construction
- Architect: I. M. Pei

Renovating team
- Renovating firm: The Bernstein Companies

Other information
- Number of units: 123
- Public transit: Waterfront-SEU; L'Enfant

Waterfront Tower is a condominium building in the Southwest area of Washington, D.C. It was designed by architect I. M. Pei in the 1960s, as part of the Southwest Washington Urban Renewal Plan. Located at 1101 3rd Street SW, the building is similar in construction to Pei's work for the Kips Bay residences in New York City, which were built during the same era.

The building was refurbished and remodeled in late 2009 by developers The Bernstein Companies, using sustainable building practices, sustainable and renewable materials, and high-efficiency lighting and heating systems. There are 123 condominiums within the building ranging from studios to two-bedroom units. The mural in the lobby was designed specifically for the building by youth non-profit arts association Arts on the Block.

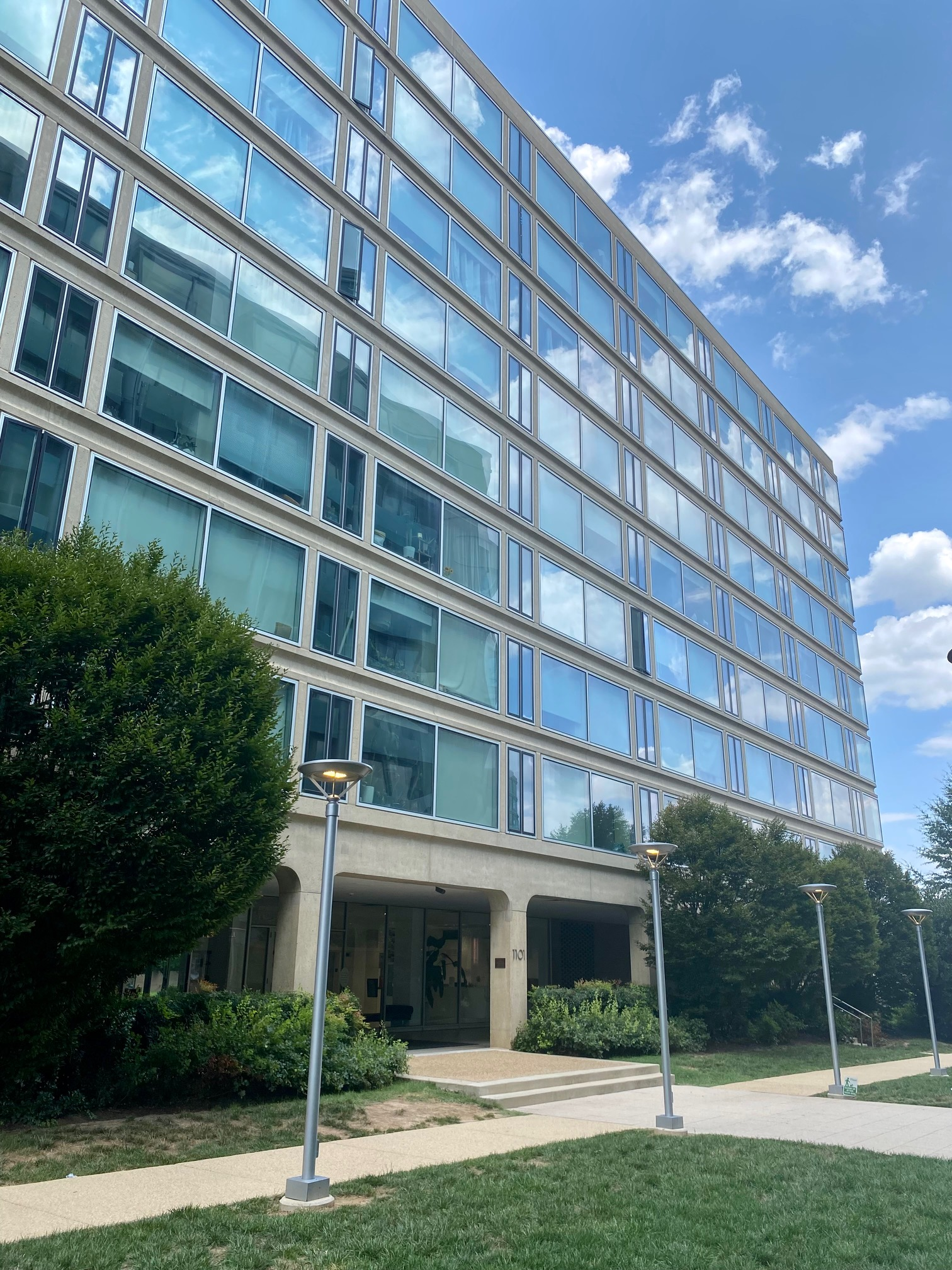
The south face of Waterfront Tower in 2023.

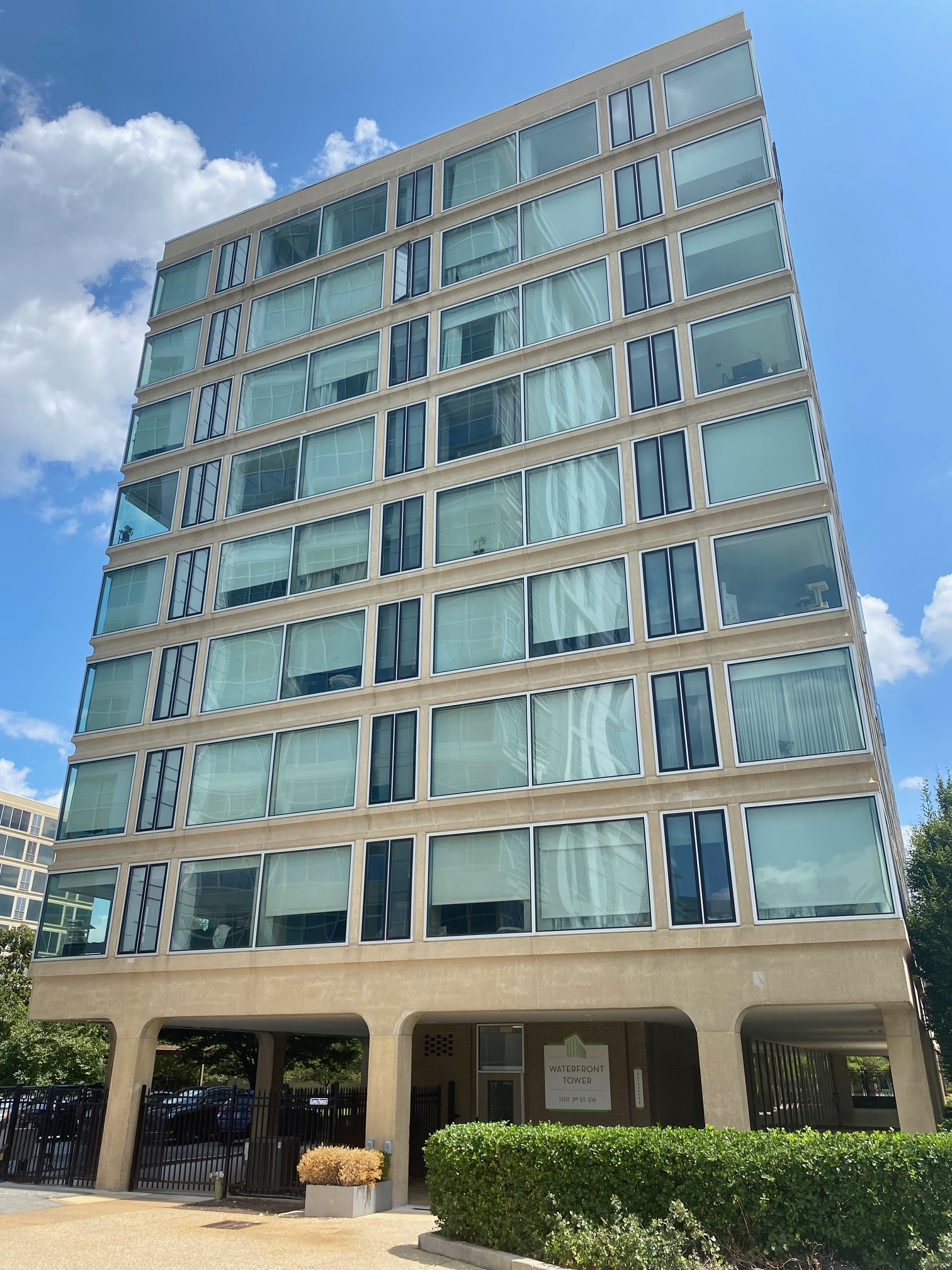
The west face of Waterfront Tower in 2023.
