= TWELVE Midtown =

Cancelled construction project

Height
- Roof: 746 ft (227 m)

Technical details
- Floor count: 58

TWELVE Midtown was to be a 746 ft. (228m) tall skyscraper in Atlanta, Georgia. It was planned to have 58 floors. The plan had a 130-room hotel with 7,400 square feet (690 m^{2}) of ballroom space, 476 condo units, 360,000 square feet (33,000 m^{2}) of office space and 30,500 square feet (2,830 m^{2}) of retail. The construction project has since been cancelled.

== See also ==
- List of tallest buildings in Atlanta
