= Lindsay Park (housing cooperative) =

Housing cooperative in Brooklyn, New York

Coordinates: 40.705°N 73.947°W

Lindsay Park is a housing cooperative located in the Williamsburg neighborhood of Brooklyn in New York City. The cooperative is part of the Mitchell-Lama Housing Program, through which the state of New York grants it tax exemptions to maintain affordability. With 2702 units, it is the largest Mitchell-Lama co-op in Brooklyn. According to a 2014 article in The New Republic, Lindsay Park is the most ethnically diverse apartment complex in the United States, with an ethnic makeup that is 33.1 percent white, 31.1 percent East Asian, 30.3 percent Hispanic, and 4.3 percent African American.

The 14-acre (5.7 ha) complex was completed in 1965. Upon its completion, the co-op was saddled with $42 million in debt after its developer, Stanley J. Harte, failed to pay the property's mortgage. As interest accumulated on the debt, it ballooned to $105 million in 2003, which led the New York City's Department of Housing Preservation and Development to renegotiate the mortgage at a lower rate. Nevertheless, revenue has remained a problem for co-op management. In 2015, the Brooklyn District Attorney's office opened an investigation into "mistreated money" by the co-op's managing board.

As of 2023, work has begun on moderate rehabilitation of the exterior facades of the buildings. Work will include elevator upgrades, electrical and plumbing upgrades, facade repairs, and both main and bulkhead roof replacements at all seven buildings.
