= River Plaza (skyscraper) =

Condominium building in Chicago, Illinois

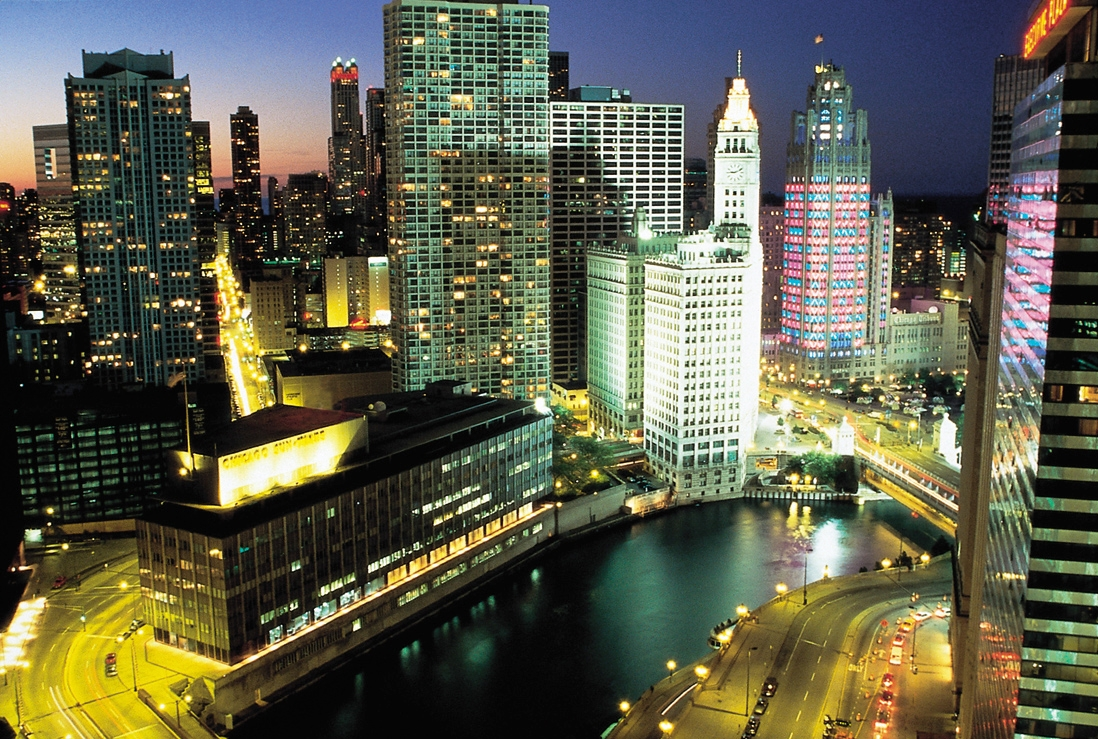
- Most of the building is visible behind the former Sun-Times Building (current site of the Trump International Hotel & Tower).
- Interactive map of the River Plaza area

General information
- Type: Residential
- Location: 405 North Wabash Avenue, Chicago, Illinois
- Coordinates: 41°53′23.3″N 87°37′32.8″W
- Completed: 1977
- Management: Community Specialists

Height
- Roof: 524 ft (160 m)

Technical details
- Floor count: 56
- Lifts/elevators: 6

Design and construction
- Architects: Gordon & Levin

River Plaza is a 524 ft (160m) tall skyscraper in Chicago, Illinois. It was completed in 1977 and has 56 floors, of which 51 are residential with a total of 678 units. Gordon & Levin designed the building, which is the 74th tallest building in Chicago.

River Plaza was converted from a rental building to condominiums in 1994 and is currently managed by Community Specialists.

== See also ==
- List of tallest buildings in Chicago
