= CenterCourt =

Coordinates: 38.043°N 84.505°W

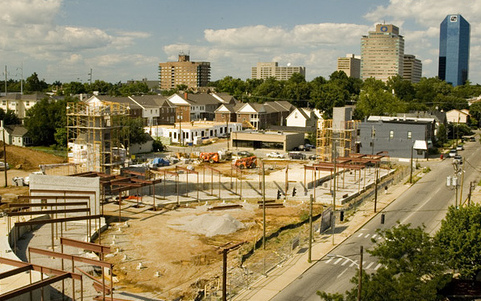
The new mixed-use CenterCourt development under construction blocks from downtown and adjacent to the University of Kentucky.

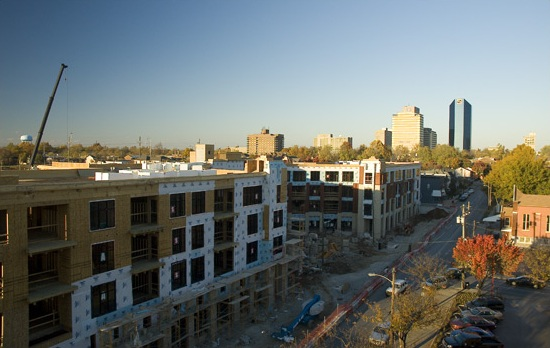
CenterCourt under construction in November 2006.

CenterCourt is a mixed-use development being constructed along South Upper at Avenue of Champions and Bolivar Street in Lexington, Kentucky within the College Town district. It is one block from the University of Kentucky and several blocks from Rupp Arena and downtown.

== History ==
On September 29, 2005, ground was broken for CenterCourt, the first venture within Lexington under a new mixed-use zoning ordinance. The project envisioned includes lofts, condominiums, town homes, and retail and dining establishments. Prices for the residences range from $130,000 to $300,000 and is geared towards "baby boomers, professionals, professors, and students."

Phase I of construction includes the four floor mixed-use structure fronting South Upper that features 76 residential condominiums and five retail vendors. A five level parking structure was constructed in the rear. Phase II of construction entails the construction of an additional 80 condominiums.

== See also ==
- Cityscape of Lexington, Kentucky
