= Cassa Hotel & Residences =

Residential skyscraper in Manhattan, New York

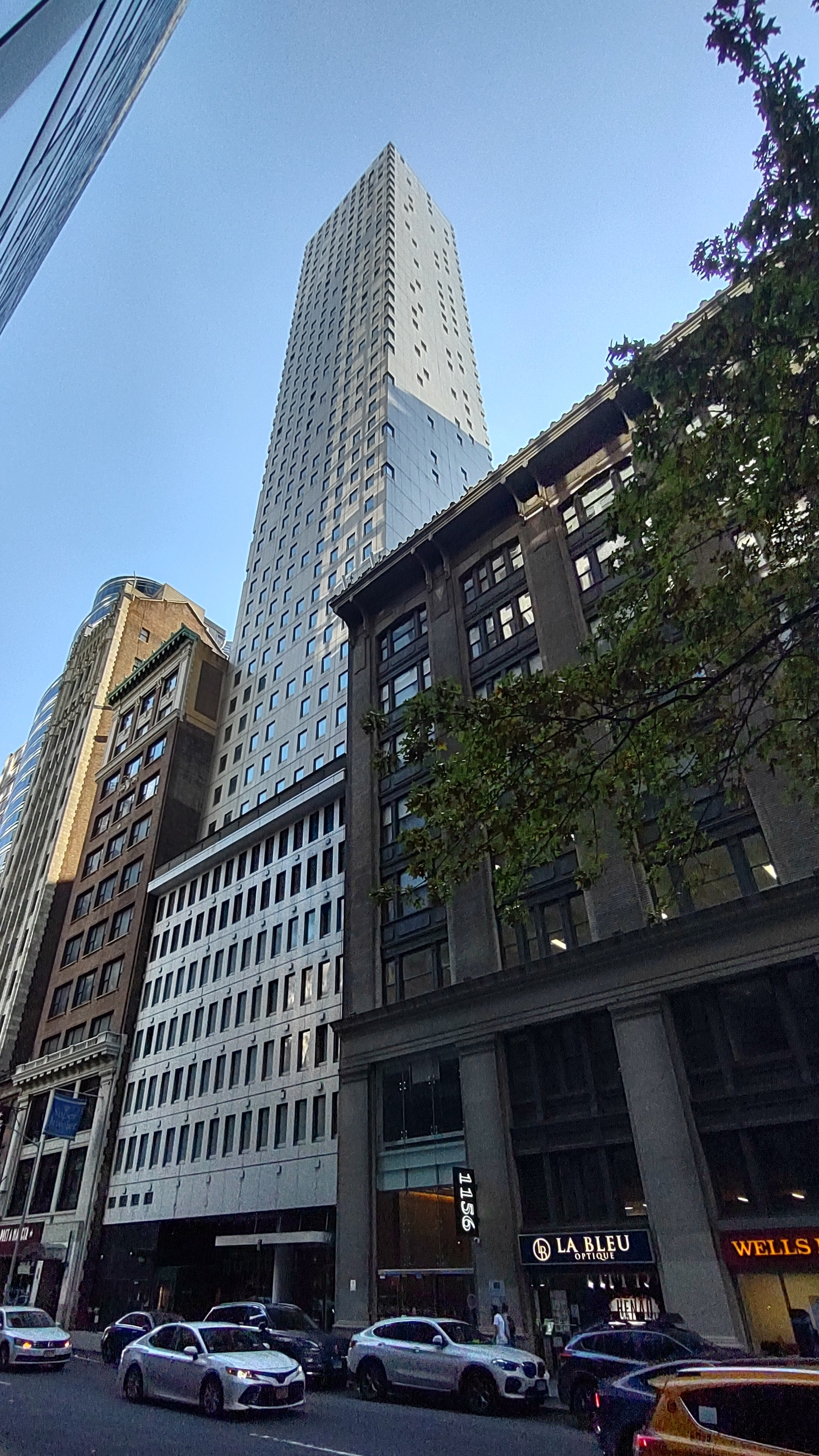

General information
- Location: 70 West 45th Street
- Coordinates: 40.756368°N 73.98176°W
- Completed: 2010

Height
- Height: 157 metres (515 ft)

Technical details
- Floor count: 48

Design and construction
- Architect: Enrique Norten
- Architecture firm: Ten Arquitectos, Cetra Ruddy
- Developer: Assa Properties

Other information
- Number of rooms: 165 hotel rooms; 57 residences

Website
- cassanyc.com

Cassa Hotel & Residences is a 48-story building at 70 West 45th Street in Midtown Manhattan in New York City. The property was designed by TEN Arquitectos, a firm led by Mexican architect Enrique Norten, in collaboration with the American design firm CetraRuddy and developed by Solly Assa's Assa Properties.

The building opened on August 1, 2010. The Cassa Hotel houses Butter Restaurant with executive chef Alex Guarnascheli.

== History ==
Cassa Hotel & Residence opened in August 2010. The property owners, Waterscape Resort, filed for bankruptcy in April 2011 and sold parts of the building for $130m.

In early 2012, Haikou-based HNA Group Co. purchased the property, with Viceroy Hotel Group overseeing management. HNA filed for corporate bankruptcy in 2021. The property was part of a long foreclosure battle, and in February 2025, the New County Supreme Court ordered a foreclosure sale. It was purchased by Aya Acquisitions in September 2025 for a reported $55 million.

== Property ==
The building is a combination of a boutique hotel, spanning from the second to the 27th floor, and luxury condominiums from the 28th to the 48th floor.

The property also houses Butter Restaurant, led by executive chef Alex Guarnascheli.
