= Condominium conversion =

In real estate, a condominium conversion or condo conversion is the process of entitling an income property or other lands currently held under one title to convert from sole ownership of the entire property (which often already is a multi unit property) into individually sold units as condominiums. Such entitlement is generally derived from approvals granted by state/provincial and/or local municipal authorities (and often other relevant agencies, such as conservation authorities).

Indeed, though, virtually every condominium project could be characterized as a conversion of property that is held generally under one title, to property that is severed into portions so that the title to most such portions (i.e., units) can be held separately. However, the term "conversion" is usually reserved for just those projects which involve changing the title (and sometimes also the use) of an existing structure, such as a multi-dwelling apartment building, row dwellings (townhomes) or a commercial multi-unit rental site.

== Analyzing property ==
(This section discusses conversions primarily from a marketing or realtor's perspective.)

The market for residential condominium conversions typically arises when the price of single family homes increases beyond the reach of the first time buyer. There are multiple types of investors involved when there is a hot conversion market. For example, an experienced developer may purchase an apartment building, hire a consultant to put the entitlements in place, and then upgrade the building so that the sales team can sell them as individual condominiums. Alternatively, a mom and pop have owned a 20 unit apartment building for 20 years and want to sell it. Rather than selling it outright as an apartment building, they hire a consultant to process the entitlements and sell the building instead at a condo premium to a developer who finishes the job.

In order to determine the sales potential of the converted units, a market analysis is needed. This part of the process involves conducting a study of the neighborhood and of any competing complexes: an inspection of the exterior of the buildings, the condition of the interiors of the units, the condition of the grounds and the amenity package in place.

== Planning the conversion ==
(This section discusses conversions primarily from a marketing or realtor's perspective.)

Using the study outlined above, a conversion plan is formulated, taking into consideration both the positive and negative aspects of the property. The plan includes budgeting for needed rehab activities and the addition of any amenities that may be lacking.

=== Homeowners Association (HOA) ===
A condo community is governed by a form of homeowners association which, in some jurisdictions, such as Ontario, Canada, is actually a condominium corporation that is managed by a board of directors. The association, of which all of the condo unit owners are members, sets out certain guidelines relative to the obligations of the unit owners as they relate to the ownership of their unit and to their participation within the condo community, subject to the restrictions, guidelines and procedures set out in the applicable statutory regime. The operation of the association or corporation is very important to the success of the condo conversion (after conversion, property maintenance and, ultimately, the enhancement of property values.

=== Marketing and financing ===
The marketing of the condos can be done either through a realtor or with in-house personnel. (As outlined above, a model unit should be used in the program.) Direct mail campaigns--mailing brochures into apartment complexes--are often very successful. Television spots on cable channels can be very productive as well. Another powerful marketing tool, one that should be taken into consideration going into the conversion, is an attractive financing package that can be made available to potential purchasers of the condos.

== Trends ==
As of 2010 the trend of apartment complexes converting into condos is gaining momentum. The low interest rate affliction that has crippled apartment fundamentals for several quarters is driving the biggest condominium conversion boom in two decades. In markets across the country, condo developers are paying a premium to acquire and transform rental properties into condos.

In 2007, most markets in the US experienced falls in mean condominium sales prices, and far fewer conversions are being performed. Some of the projects which have been completed are now selling at auction for discounted prices, or remain unsold.

Some jurisdictions have adopted tenant protections in response to condominium conversion. In Washington, D.C., the Tenant Opportunity to Purchase Act was enacted in 1980 as part of the Rental Housing Conversion and Sale Act of 1980, which addressed rental-housing conversion and sale procedures.

== See also ==
- Dockominium
- Subdivision (land)
