= Fordham =

Fordham may refer to:

== Education ==
- Fordham Preparatory School, an all-male, Jesuit high school in New York City
- Fordham University, a Jesuit university in New York City
  - Fordham Rams, athletic teams of the above university
  - Fordham University School of Law, a law school of the above university

== Geography ==
- Fordham, Bronx, New York, United States
  - Fordham Road, a major street in the above neighborhood
  - Fordham (Metro-North station), a railway station in the above neighborhood
- Fordham, Pennsylvania, an unincorporated community
- Fordham, Wisconsin, United States, a ghost town
- Fordham, Missouri, an unincorporated community
- Fordham, Cambridgeshire, England
- Fordham, Essex, England
- Fordham, Norfolk, England

== Architecture ==
- The Fordham, a skyscraper in Chicago, Illinois
- Chicago Spire (originally proposed as Fordham Spire), a cancelled supertall skyscraper in Chicago, Illinois

== Ships ==
- HMS Fordham, a Royal Navy Ham class minesweeper
- MV Fordham, a ship which was converted into a minesweeper during World War II

== Other ==
- Fordham (surname)
- Fordham Company, a real estate development firm based in Chicago, Illinois
- Fordham Hospital, a former hospital in Fordham, Bronx
- Thomas B. Fordham Institute, a nonprofit education policy organization
- Fordham Experiment, an experiment on The Effects of Television in 1967 or 1968 at Fordham University
- Fordham (horse), a Thoroughbred racehorse
