= Gateway Tower (Chicago) =

Proposed building in Chicago, Illinois

- Interactive map of the Gateway Tower area

General information
- Status: Vision
- Type: Mixed Use
- Location: 400 Lake Shore Drive, Chicago, IL
- Coordinates: 41.89°N 87.615°W

Height
- Roof: 2,000 feet (610 m)

Technical details
- Floor count: 127
- Floor area: 2,159,094 sq ft (200,600 m^{2})

Design and construction
- Architect: Gensler

The Gateway Tower is a conceptual proposal to illustrate a potential use of the abandoned site once planned to house the Chicago Spire in the Streeterville neighborhood of the Near North Side of Chicago.

== Details ==
The plan calls for a building 2,000 feet (610 m) tall and feature commercial elements that augment residential use. It was the result of a company-wide internal competition at Gensler to replace the Chicago Spire. As of June 2016, the building is conceptual, and Maxim writer, Scott Tharler, considered the project unlikely. The building would include condos, apartments, a hotel, a Skylobby, a Skydeck with a restaurant, an amusement ride and sky-garden. The base of the building would be in a public park and its supports would span over Lake Shore Drive as well as provide access to the skydeck.

== Property background ==
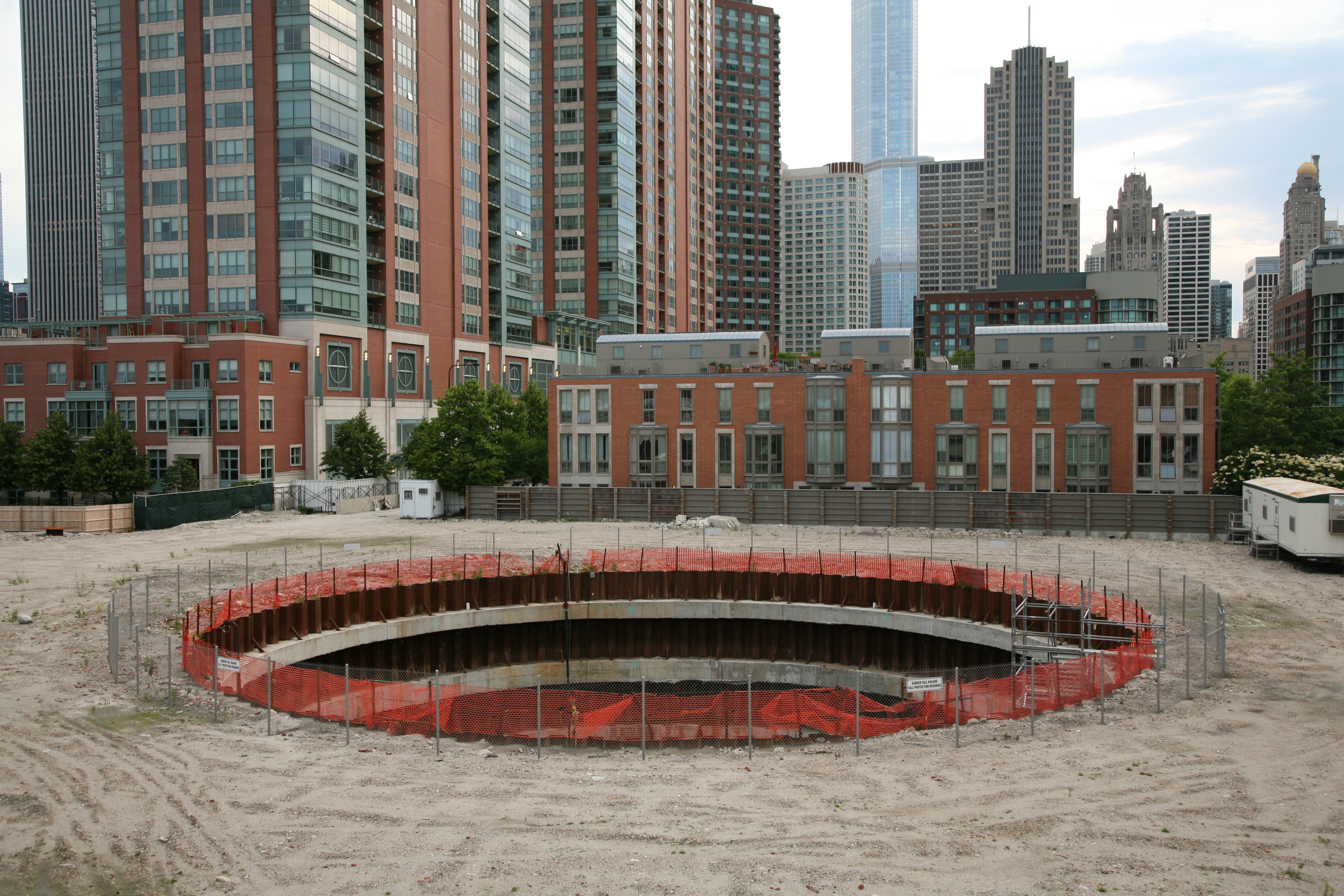
The Chicago Spire construction site has been dormant since late 2008.

The Chicago Spire, originally called the Fordham Spire, was originally proposed in July 2005. In March 2006, the initial design of the building was approved by the Chicago Plan Commission, the city's Zoning Committee and the Chicago City Council. In December 2006 and March 2007, the design of the building was revised. The Chicago Plan Commission, Chicago's zoning committee and the Chicago City Council approved the final plans of the Chicago Spire in April and May 2007. By October 2008, the late-2000s recession led to the suspension of construction and a $11.34 million (USD) lien on the construction site. On October 31, 2014 the project's biggest creditor, Related Midwest, compelled the developer, Shelbourne Development Group, to surrender the deed to the property after failing to make the necessary payment. The pre-development of the Chicago Spire left a 110-foot (34 m) wide, 76-foot (23 m) deep hole in the ground which has since been developed over with the 400 Lake Shore Drive towers.
