= Waldorf-Astoria Hotel and Residence Tower =

Canceled skyscraper in Chicago, Illinois

Waldorf-Astoria Hotel & Residence Tower
- Rendering of the proposed building, standing adjacent to the existing NBC Tower
- Interactive map of the Waldorf-Astoria Hotel & Residence Tower area

General information
- Status: Proposed
- Type: Residential/Commercial
- Location: Chicago, Illinois
- Coordinates: 41°53′24.1″N 87°37′8.8″W
- Construction started: 2026
- Estimated completion: 2031

Height
- Antenna spire: 1,265 ft (386 m)
- Roof: 1,200 ft (370 m)

Technical details
- Floor count: 107

Design and construction
- Architects: DeStefano & Partners
- Developer: The Prime Group

Waldorf-Astoria Hotel and Residence Tower Chicago is a planned hotel and condominium skyscraper that would have been 1,265 feet (386 m) tall. The Prime Group was in charge of the project, which was proposed at a cost of $610 million. The building would have been located one block from the Chicago River, and north of the Sheraton Chicago in the Streeterville neighborhood of the Near North Side community area of Chicago. Another of the building's developers, the Fordham Company, was also the initial developer of the now-cancelled Chicago Spire.

The building would have been the third tallest building in Chicago, as only the Willis Tower and the Trump International Hotel and Tower are taller than 1,200 feet (366 m). It would have been among the tallest buildings in the world, since only 25 buildings in the world currently exceed 1,200 feet (366 m).

Early in 2012, the approval process began for a much smaller mixed-use tower on the site.

== Plans ==
Had it been completed, the proposed hotel portion of the building would have been managed by The Waldorf-Astoria Collection, a Hilton Hotels Corporation brand, as part of a larger strategy of limited expansion of its legendary Manhattan name. Within this plan, other Waldorf-Astorias are planned or under construction in Beverly Hills, California, Orlando, Florida and Montreal, Quebec . This management agreement is currently a verbal commitment.

The plans included a 325-room hotel and 300 luxury condominiums. The building, which would have been 107 stories, was designed to salute the Chicago Spire, but not imitate it. It had a traditional square base and taper to a scalpel shaped top. The plan was to aim for a three-year construction period starting in 2009 with sales targeted at $800/square foot instead of the $1200 range that the Spire had targeted. The building was designed to adhere to current trend in Chicago architecture that taller thin buildings are favored to shorter buildings providing the same square footage because the slender buildings block fewer views. The first 31 floors of the skyscraper would have had a St. Regis Hotel with 325 rooms, while the floors from 32 to 100 have residential apartments. There are 300 luxury apartments with 6 duplex penthouses from the 92nd to the 100th floor. The 101st floor of the skyscraper features a club lounge and a restaurant.

Reschke's Prime Group is developing several other properties in Chicago including 10 E. Delaware Place and the Roanoke building.
