= 400 Lake Shore =

Under-construction buildings in Chicago, Illinois

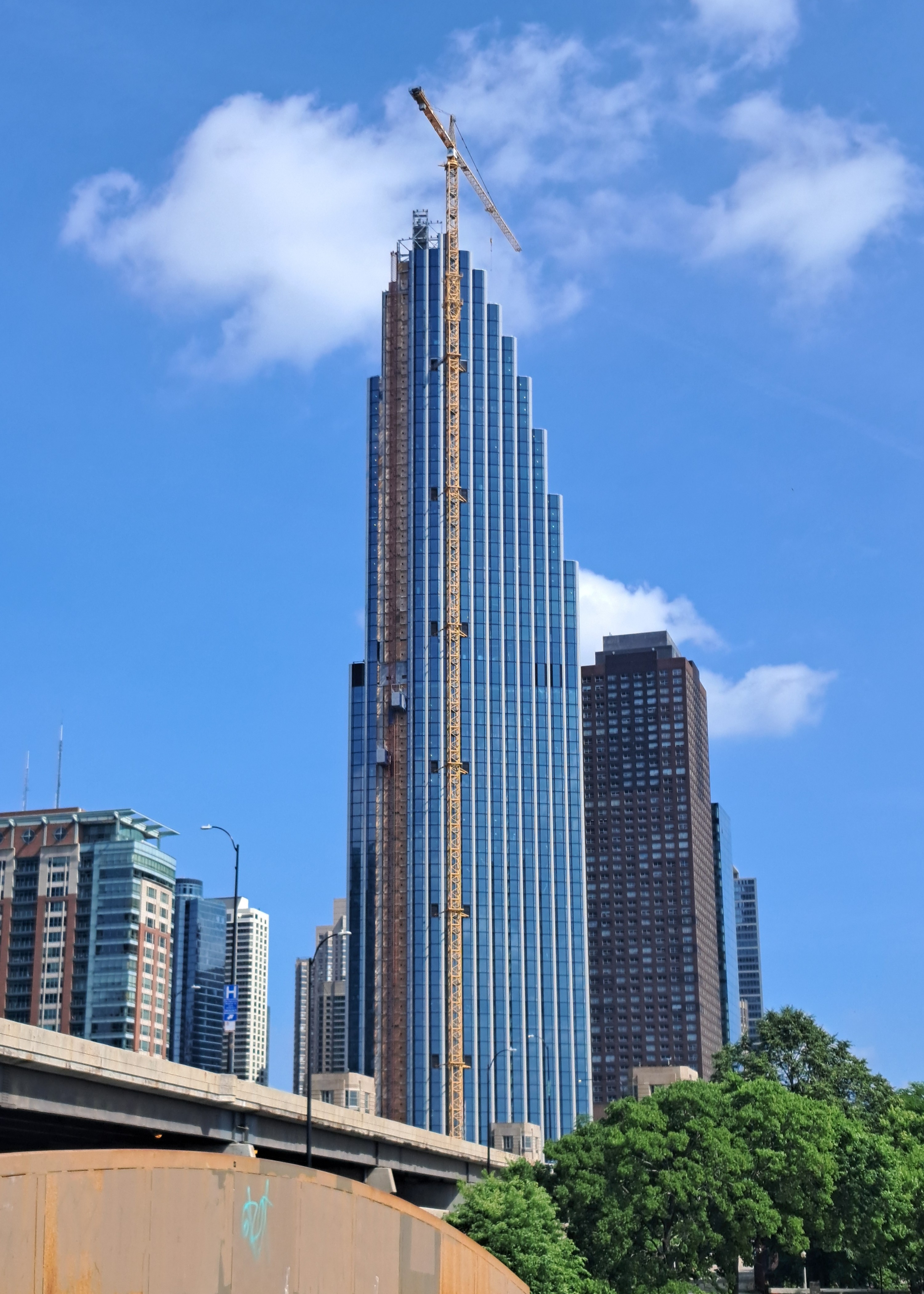
- Under construction, June 2026

General information
- Status: North Tower: Topped-out; South Tower: Proposed
- Type: Residential
- Location: 400 North Lake Shore Drive; Chicago, Illinois 60611; United States
- Coordinates: 41°53′24″N 87°36′54″W
- Construction started: 2024
- Estimated completion: North tower: 2027; South tower: TBA
- Owner: Related Midwest

Height
- Architectural: North tower: 875 ft (267 m); South tower: 765 ft (233 m)

Technical details
- Floor count: North tower: 72; South tower: 64
- Lifts/elevators: 8 high-speed elevators made by Otis Elevator Company in the North Tower

Design and construction
- Architects: Skidmore, Owings and Merrill; David Childs; Scott Duncan

400 Lake Shore is a skyscraper complex under construction in the Streeterville neighborhood of Chicago, Illinois, United States. The development is located on the site of the previously proposed Chicago Spire, along the Chicago River and Lake Shore Drive at the Link Bridge. Its plan features two connected residential towers with a height of 875 feet (267 m) for the northern tower, and 765 feet (233 m) for the southern tower. The first phase of the construction also includes the long awaited landscaping and build-out of DuSable Park, as a public park for the Chicago Park District at the mouth of the Chicago River.

Related Midwest is developing the project and the lead designer is David Childs, of the architecture and urban planning firm Skidmore, Owings, and Merrill. The project had undergone a number of revisions before its approval in 2020. Completion of the northern tower is scheduled for 2027. An official groundbreaking ceremony occurred in June 2024.

== Background ==
Original plans for the site included the Santiago Calatrava-designed Chicago Spire, which would have been the second tallest building in the world at completion had it been built as planned. The project, led by Garrett Kelleher of the Shelbourne Development Group, fell through as a result of financial difficulties during the Great Recession. In 2010, after many lawsuits against Kelleher and Shelbourne, courts handed control of the site to a receiver.

In 2013, Ireland's National Asset Management Agency (NAMA) put the site up for sale, and Shelbourne sought a court-approved reorganization plan to continue the Spire project. Related Midwest was one of the creditors of the plan, and purchased the debt associated with the property in June. In 2014, Shelbourne failed to make a required payment to Related Midwest, and after a lawsuit, Related was handed full control of the site. Related announced that they would not move forward with the Chicago Spire project.

== Development ==
=== Planning ===
In 2016, two years after the site was handed to Related Midwest, architectural firm Gensler released conceptual renderings for the site, and dubbed their proposal the "Gateway Tower". In December 2017, renders for the site by Zaha Hadid Architects were leaked, but Related Midwest denied these were the final designs for the site. In May 2018, Related released their first official plans for the site. The designs called for a two-tower complex, with a 1,100-foot (335 m) tower and an 850-foot (259 m) tower, featuring bay windows and terracotta cladding, and connected at ground level by a podium housing two restaurants and a ballroom. The towers were to contain 300 condominium units, 175 hotel rooms, and 500 rental apartments. The designs also included the revitalization of the adjacent, undeveloped DuSable Park. The office of Alderman Brendan Reilly rejected the plans that October because of various concerns with the development's potential impact on the neighborhood. Reilly objected to the inclusion of hotel rooms and the scale of the podium connecting the two buildings. Without Reilly's approval, the project was unable to move forward.

In February 2019, the Plan Commission voted in favor of extending Related's zoning rights until May 2020, to accommodate for time needed to revise the project's design. In response to Reilly's objections, Related Midwest prepared revised plans. The revisions were announced in March 2020. Adjustments to the design included height reductions for the towers: the north tower was reduced to 875 feet (267 m), and the south tower to 765 feet (233 m). The scale of the podium was reduced, and the hotel was scrapped, making it an entirely residential development. In June 2020, the Chicago City Council approved an updated design for the development. In partial exchange for development rights, Related Midwest pledged $10 million to finish DuSable Park, matched by $5 million from the city government. In addition, Related agreed to make several design changes to improve pedestrian safety on adjacent streets.

=== Construction ===
Related Midwest received a permit for a construction crane in January 2024, at which point work on the first tower was to be completed in 2027. An official groundbreaking ceremony took place on June 17, 2024. Workers began installing 362,000 square feet (33,600 m^{2}) of facade panels on the first tower at the end of April 2025; at the time, the first tower's concrete frame had reached the 22nd floor. By August 2025, the cofferdam around the Chicago Spire site was nearly filled. In addition, workers were constructing one floor slab about every three days, and contractors prefabricated mechanical equipment elsewhere so that they could be installed quickly.

== Description ==
400 Lake Shore consists of two towers, which are oriented at an angle. The north tower, which is being built first, measures 875 feet (267 m) tall. There are 635 apartments in the north tower, ranging from studio apartments to three-bedroom units; one-fifth of the units are to be affordable. The south tower will be 765 feet (233 m) tall and have 500 units. The towers will have setbacks, which form exterior terraces on several levels. Each tower will also have design features similar to Chicago windows.

== See also ==
- List of tallest buildings in Chicago
