= The Fordham =

Condominium building in Chicago, Illinois

Coordinates: 41.8955°N 87.6273°W

The Fordham is one of the tallest residential buildings in Chicago. The 52-story building was completed in 2003 at a height of 574 ft (175 m) and features a château-like roof. It was designed by Solomon, Cordwell, Buenz and Associates and developed by the Fordham Company.

Developer Christopher T. Carley also included townhomes on the eleventh floor of the building. The townhomes face a private courtyard on top of the parking garage and each is equipped with its own elevator.

The Fordham contains some of the most expensive residential units in Chicago with penthouses occupying the top ten floors of the building.

== See also ==
- The Pinnacle
- List of skyscrapers
- List of tallest buildings in Chicago
