= The Pinnacle (Chicago) =

Condominium building in Chicago, Illinois

Coordinates: 41.8945°N 87.6271°W

General information
- Type: Residential
- Location: 21 East Huron Street; Chicago, Illinois
- Completed: 2004

Height
- Roof: 163 m (535 ft)

Technical details
- Floor count: 49

Design and construction
- Architect(s): Lucien Lagrange Architects
- Developer: Fordham Company

The Pinnacle is a residential skyscraper in downtown Chicago, Illinois. It was designed by Lucien Lagrange Architects and was developed by the Fordham Company. Completed in 2004 the building measures 535 ft (169 m) tall with 49 stories. The building houses its own on-site auto repair and wine tasting rooms.

== See also ==
- Fordham Company
- The Fordham
