= DuSable Park (Chicago) =

Park in Chicago, Illinois

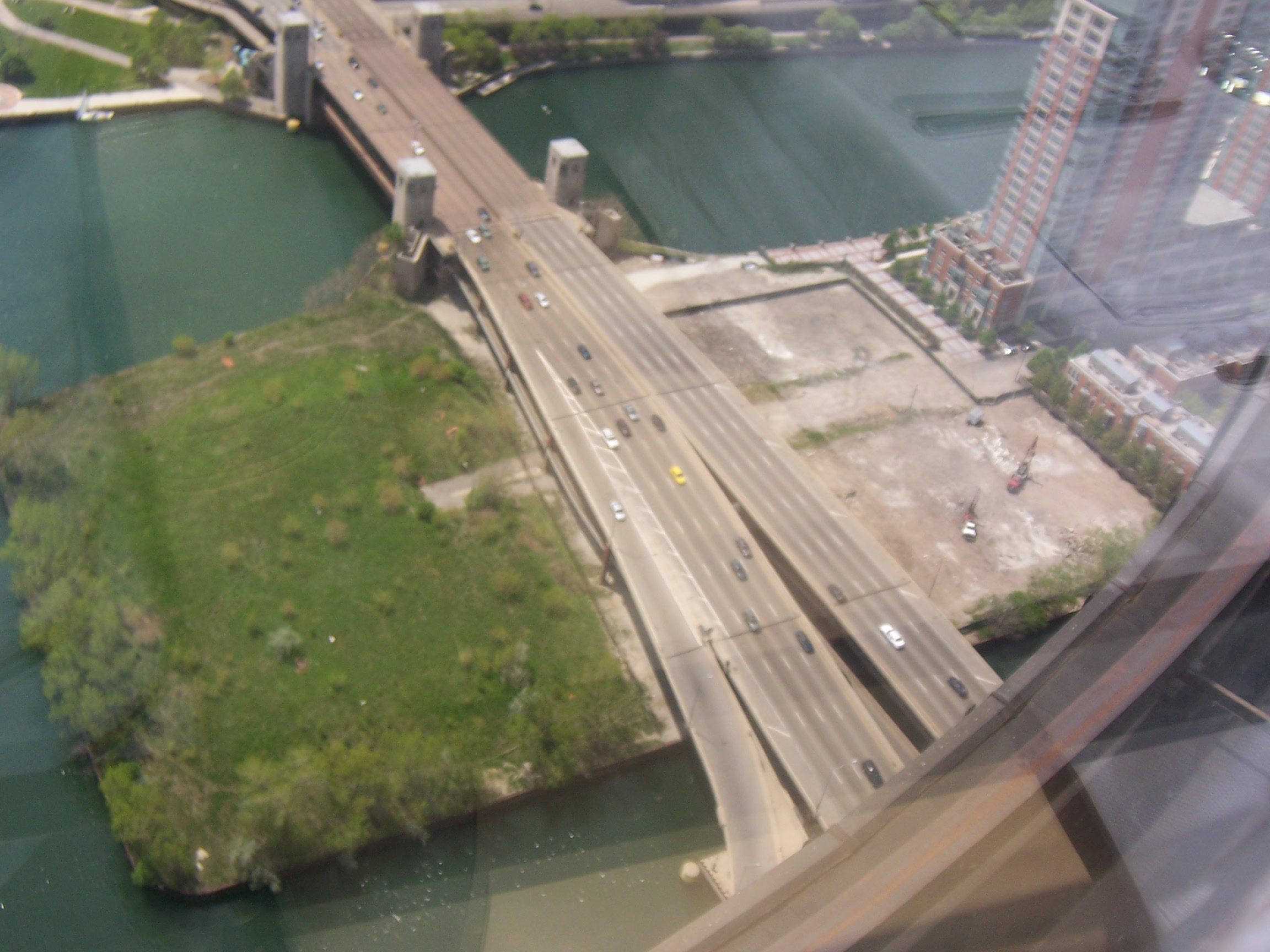
- photograph of site, captured circa 2004 from the nearby Lake Point Tower
- Interactive map of DuSable Park
- Location: Chicago, Illinois
- Coordinates: 41°53′22″N 87°36′48″W
- Area: Streeterville
- Website: www.chicagoparkdistrict.com/parks-facilities/dusable-jean-baptiste-pointe-park

DuSable Park is a former commercial and industrial site in Chicago, Illinois. It is located at the mouth of the Chicago River that has been the subject of environmental remediation and is undergoing redevelopment into a public park. The project, first announced in 1987 by Mayor Harold Washington, is named in honor of Jean Baptiste Point du Sable, who settled nearby in the 1780s and is known as the "Founder of Chicago". For decades, the project has awaited completion of remediation, funding, and agreements to develop. The development at 400 Lake Shore began construction in 2024.

== Location ==
The park is located directly east of North Lake Shore Drive and south of Lake Point Tower and Navy Pier, with Lake Michigan to its east. To its north is the entrance to the Ogden Slip and to its south is the mouth of the Chicago River. The canceled Chicago Spire project had been planned for a site just west of DuSable Park, on the other side of Lake Shore Drive.

== History ==
=== Formation ===
Following the construction of the original jetty for the Chicago Harbor Lighthouse, lake currents were affected and soil was deposited at the area now known as DuSable Park. In 1857, the State of Illinois sold 40 acres (160,000 m^{2}), including the site later to be known as DuSable Park, to the Chicago Dock and Canal Trust. In 1893, the company dug out the Ogden Slip to allow boats to pull cargo from railroads at North Pier and the DuSable Park site was filled in by the United States Army Corps of Engineers.

In 1948, the Chicago Plan Commission passed a resolution excluding use of lakefront property to only recreation or for harbor or terminal facilities for passenger and freight vessels. In 1964, the Chicago Dock and Canal trust leased the land to the developers of Lake Point Tower. Chicago Dock and Canal Trust sold the land south of the tower to Centex (now PulteGroup) with an option to build additional towers on the site that is now DuSable Park.

=== Becoming DuSable Park ===
In an effort to fight possible development, Mayor Richard J. Daley's administration enacted the Lakefront Protection Ordinance which forbid the land east of Lake Shore Drive to be developed. In 1972, Centex filed a lawsuit against the City of Chicago after the city purchased the land. Eventually Centex dropped the option to build on DuSable Park. The Chicago Dock and Canal Trust kept the option to build but agreed not to build on the site.

In 1987, Mayor Harold Washington dedicated the parcel as "DuSable Park" in honor of Jean Baptiste Point du Sable, the first known settler of Chicago. The Chicago Park District took ownership of the land at DuSable Park in 1988 via a quit claim deed. Eight years later, Keer-McGee and River East L.L.C were named as companies responsible for investigating and cleaning up suspected radioactive contamination at DuSable Park. The next year, MCL Companies absorbed the holdings of Chicago Dock and Canal Trust, including the land for DuSable Park. MCL Companies then gave the land to the Chicago Park District and agreed to pay $600,000 toward its development.

In July 2000, the Chicago Park District announced it was planning to lease the land to another developer to build a parking lot on the site. Following public outcry and the formation of the DuSable Park Coalition, the Chicago Park District indefinitely postponed the parking lot plan. Since that time, two public request for proposals were sent out on the topic of developing the property in 2001 and 2004. Each of those public invitations ended in stalemates. The Art Institute of Chicago tapped Martin Puryear to design a statue of Jean Baptiste Point du Sable which will be erected at DuSable Harbor, directly across the river.

=== A new DuSable Park ===
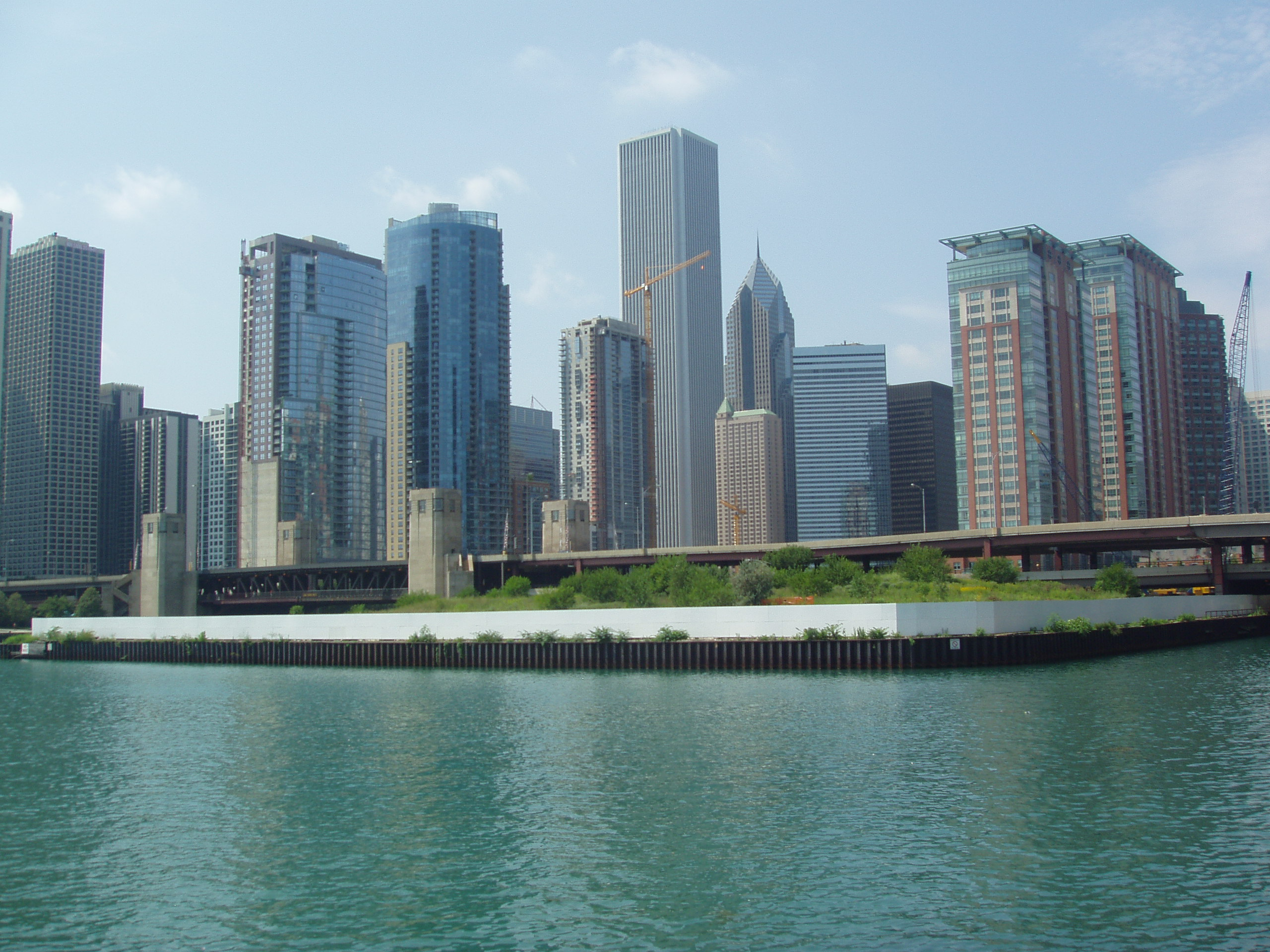
DuSable Park was a staging area for the construction site of the now cancelled Chicago Spire.

In July 2005, Christopher Carley of the Fordham Company announced a new development project called the Fordham Spire. The Fordham Company pledged nearly $500,000 to assist in the development of the park, which was to adjoin the site of their new tower. But one year later Carley failed to obtain the necessary financing for his project, and the development of the adjacent tower was turned over to Garret Kelleher of Shelbourne Development and the building was renamed Chicago Spire.

In late 2006, the Chicago Sun-Times reported that the project may be going forward with a compromise on the design being reached, but no further financial assistance was promised. In March 2007, Shelbourne Development, the new development company which renamed the adjacent project Chicago Spire, offered $6 million to finish the development of DuSable Park. In early May of the same year, that offer jumped to $9.6 million.

Shelbourne offered their own design of the park which included a northbound ramp onto Lake Shore Drive for the adjacent Chicago Spire. To appease citizens and members of the DuSable Park Coalition, Shelbourne Development redesigned the northbound ramp to fit under Lake Shore Drive and use less park space. The Chicago Spire was later cancelled in early 2010, due to major setbacks. After additional remediation, a new plan was developed in 2023.

== Redevelopment concerns ==
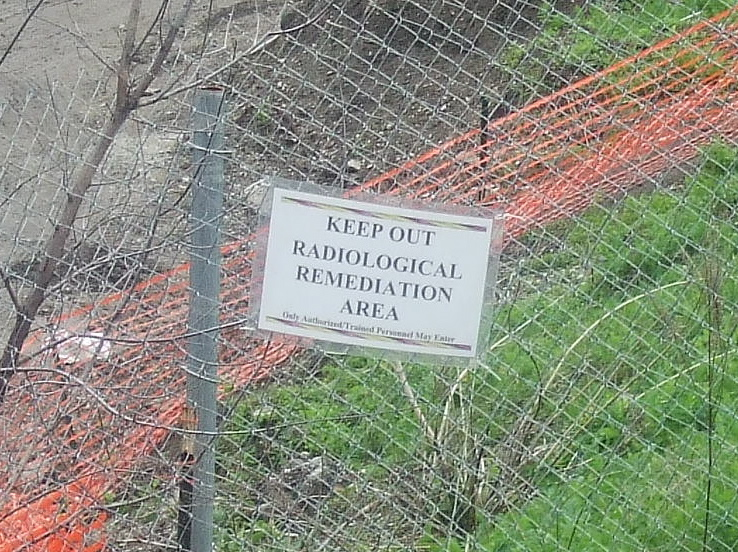
"Keep out - radiological remediation area", a sign near contaminated soil at DuSable Park.

The riverside revetment is in need of repair which may cost up to $5.7 million.

Soil tests performed at the location of DuSable Park in December 2000 showed contamination by radioactive thorium. From 1904 through 1936, the Lindsay Light Company processed ores which contained thorium to manufacture thorium impregnated gas mantles.

It was suspected that after the plant closed, contaminated soil was dumped on the location of the proposed park. In March 2003, the Chicago Park District stated that the thorium clean-up on that land was incomplete. It was reported that Shelbourne Development would take soil samples to determine the severity of the radioactive contamination.

In 2012, the Chicago Park District received funding from the EPA for remediation of the site, bagging the radioactive soil and shipping it to a Superfund site. In summer 2013, the Park District website reported the remediation had been completed by September 2012.

== Park construction ==
In 2024, Related Midwest announced the start of construction of its development at 400 Lake Shore Drive on the former Spire site. The first phase includes the build out and opening of DuSable Park.
