= William B. Ogden =

American politician (1805–1877)

William Butler Ogden
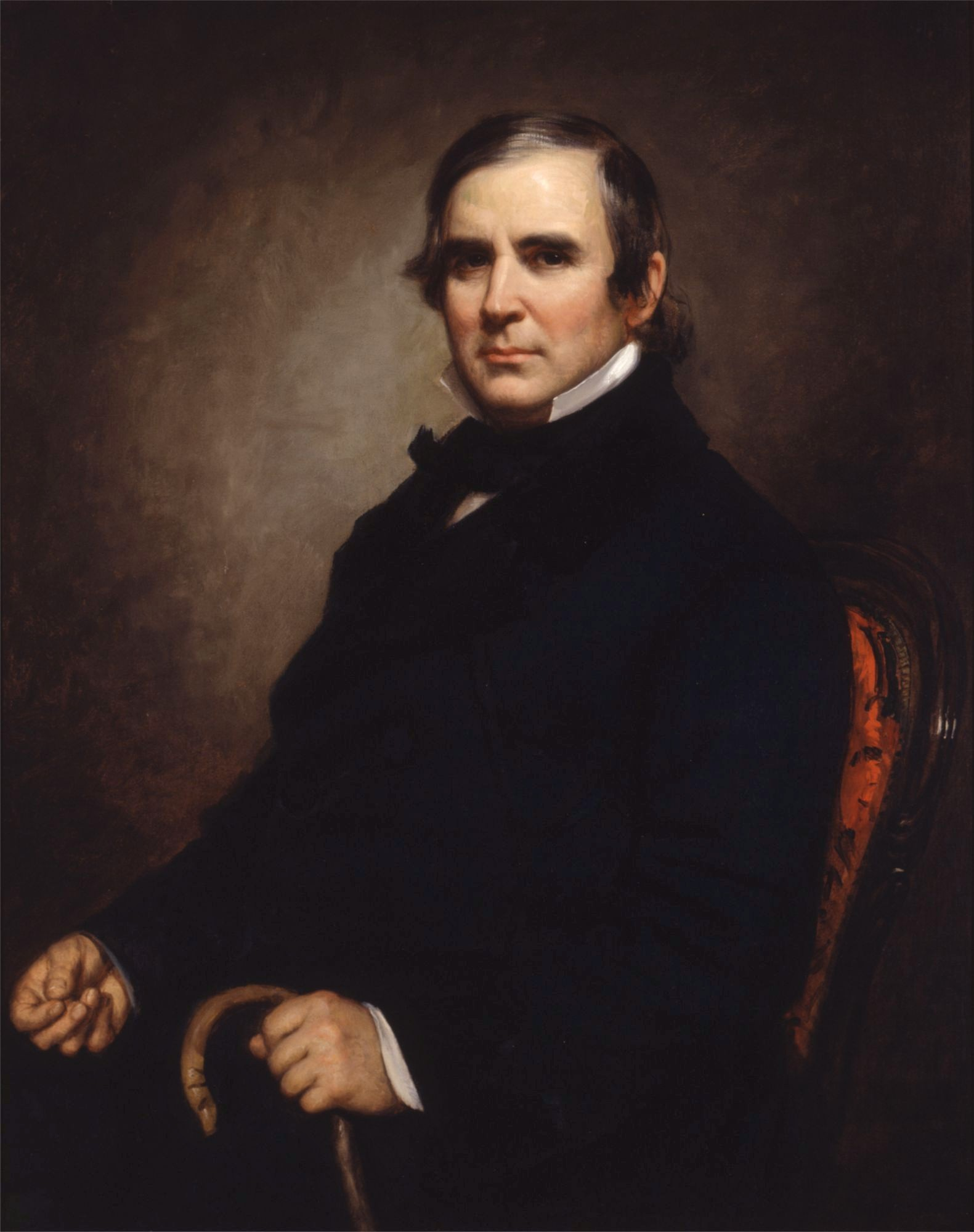

1st Mayor of Chicago
- In office May 1837 – March 1838
- Preceded by: John H. Kinzie (president of town Board of Trustees)
- Succeeded by: Buckner Stith Morris

Member of the Illinois Senate
- In office 1860–1861

Chicago Alderman
- In office 1847–1848 Serving with Michael McDonald
- Preceded by: constituency established
- Succeeded by: Samuel McKay
- Constituency: 9th ward
- In office 1840–1841 Serving with R. J. Hamilton
- Preceded by: John H. Kinzie / Buckner Stith Morris
- Succeeded by: George F. Foster / James J. H. Howe
- Constituency: 6th ward

Member of the New York State Assembly
- In office January 1, 1835 – December 31, 1835
- Constituency: Delaware County, New York

Postmaster of Walton, New York
- In office ~1829–1835
- Appointed by: Andrew Jackson

Personal details
- Born: June 15, 1805 Walton, New York, U.S.
- Died: August 3, 1877 (aged 72) New York City, U.S.
- Party: Democratic (Before 1860)
- Other political affiliations: Republican (Beginning in 1860)
- Spouse: Marianna Tuttle Arnot
- Education: New York University Law School
- Occupation: Real Estate Developer

William Butler Ogden (June 15, 1805 – August 3, 1877) was an American politician and railroad executive who served as the first Mayor of Chicago. He was referred to as "the Astor of Chicago." He was, at one time, the city's richest citizen. He brought the Galena & Chicago Union RR out of insolvency and was its first president in 1847. He created the Chicago & North Western Railway from the failed remains of the Chicago, St.Paul, Fond du Lac and was its first president in 1859. He spearheaded the 1st transcontinental railroad as the Union Pacific and was its first president in 1862, although he relinquished that position due to poor health.

Ogden serves as the namesake for Chicago's Ogden Avenue, The Bronx's Odgen Avenue, the Ogden Slip in Chicago (which was constructed by his Chicago Dock and Canal Company), and Ogden, Iowa. A 1994 survey of experts on Chicago politics assessed Ogden as one of the ten best mayors in the city's history (up to that time). (Note: The others in the top-ten were Anton Cermak (mayor 1931–33); Richard J. Daley (mayor 1955–76); Richard M. Daley (then-incumbent mayor since 1989); Edward Fitzsimmons Dunne (mayor 1905–07); Carter Harrison III (mayor 1879–1887 and 1893); Carter Harrison IV (mayor 1897–1905 and 1911–15); Edward Joseph Kelly (mayor 1933–47); Harold Washington (mayor 1983–87); John Wentworth (mayor 1857–58 and 1860–61))

== Early life and career in New York ==
Ogden was born on June 15, 1805, in Walton, New York. He was the son of Abraham Ogden (1771–1825) and Abigail (née Weed) Ogden (1788–1850).

When Ogden was sixteen, he took over the family real estate and lumber businesses after his father suffered a debilitating stroke. Ogden proved an adept businessman, and improved the fortunes of his family's businesses.

When Ogden was eighteen, he began his military service. At the time, young men of the state were required to serve in the military. He was commissioned as an officer on his first day of duty, and on the second was assigned as the aide of Brigadier-General Frederic P. Foote. Ogden was elevated to the rank of Major, and later became a brigade inspector for several years.

When Ogden was twenty, his father died. Ogden assisted Charles Butler, his brother-in-law, with business matters related to opening a new building for New York University, attending the law school for a brief period himself.

Ogden was appointed by President Andrew Jackson to serve as postmaster of Walton, New York, which was Ogden's first political position. He held this office up until moving to Chicago. By the age of 29, he had become a lawyer and was elected a member of New York State Assembly, representing Delaware County in 1835 as a member of the 58th New York State Legislature.

During his career in New York politics, Ogden was a Jacksonian Democrat. However, Ogden was also an advocate of government funding for infrastructural improvements, aspiring to see the federal government financially back the construction of a railroad from New York to Chicago. He told colleagues that such a railroad would be "the most splendid system of internal communication ever yet devised by man." He had been elected to the New York Senate on a platform supporting state funding for the construction of the New York and Erie Railroad. The bill he backed to accomplish this was passed.

== Career in Chicago ==
One of Ogden's brothers-in-law purchased a tract of land in Chicago for $100,000 in 1834. Ogden went to survey this area in 1835, and wrote back that his relative had "been guilty of the grossest folly" as the land held no value due to being boggy and swampy. However, he sold 1/3 of the land for more than the entire tract been purchased for after the muddy environment dried up in summer. Ogden chose to stay in Chicago rather than return to New York.

While Ogden's initial concern in Chicago was based in his land interests there, he believed that he could not afford to stay out of the politics of the city, as he believed growing western towns such as Chicago were dependent on government assistance.

In Chicago, Ogden created a land and trust agency bearing his name, which he operated from 1836 to 1843. In 1843, he brought in William E. Jones as a partner to the growing agency which became Ogden, Jones Co. The agency would later become Ogden, Fleetwood & Co.

=== Political career in Chicago ===
Shortly after moving to Chicago in 1836, Ogden joined the committee responsible for drafting the city charter to be submitted to the state legislature.

In 1837, he was elected the first mayor of Chicago, serving a single one-year term. From 1840 through 1841, he served on the Chicago Common Council as an alderman from the 6th Ward. From 1847 through 1848, he served as an alderman from the 9th Ward.

Ogden was a booster of Chicago both during and after his tenures in elected office. At the time he came to Chicago, its buildings were largely wood cabins, it lacked sidewalks and decent bridges, it had no paved roads, and it lacked water supply infrastructure. As a politician he advocated for the city to raise tax revenue for new roads, plank sidewalks, and bridges (which he presented designs of his own for). He also used his own wealth to fund improvements to the city's infrastructure.

Ogden later stayed removed from politics. However, he reluctantly accepted a seat in the Illinois Senate after the Republican Party selected him as a candidate. He served in the state state 1860–61.

=== Railroad career ===
Ogden was a leading promoter and investor in the Illinois and Michigan Canal, then switched his loyalty to railroads. Throughout his later life, Ogden was heavily involved in the building of several railroads.

"In 1847, Ogden announced a plan to build a railway out of Chicago, but no capital was forthcoming. Eastern investors were wary of Chicago's reputation for irrational boosterism, and Chicagoans did not want to divert traffic from their profitable canal works. So Ogden and his partner J. Young Scammon solicited subscriptions from the farmers and small businessmen whose land lay adjacent to the proposed rail. Farmer's wives used the money they earned from selling eggs to buy shares of stock on a monthly payment plan. By 1848, Ogden and Scammon had raised $350,000 (Note: equivalent to $13,024,038 in 2025)—enough to begin laying track. The Galena and Chicago Union Railroad was profitable from the start and eventually extended out to Wisconsin, bringing grain from the Great Plains into the city. As president of Union Pacific, Ogden extended the reach of Chicago's rail lines to the West coast."

In 1853, the Chicago Land Company, of which Ogden was a trustee, purchased land at a bend in the Chicago River and began to cut a channel, formally known as North Branch Canal, but also referred to as Ogden's Canal. The resulting island is now known as Goose Island.

In 1857, Ogden created the Chicago Dock and Canal Company. Ogden designed the first swing bridge in Chicago and donated the land for Rush Medical Center. Ogden was also a founder of the Chicago Board of Trade.

In 1860, Ogden acquired 5,000 acres (2,000 ha) of land Brady's Bend along the Allegheny River in Pennsylvania, which contained iron and coal mines, rolling-mills, furnaces (today known as the Bradys Bend Iron Company Furnaces), and a village with approximately 1,500 residents. Along with several acquaintances, Ogden founded the Brady’s Bend Iron Company with $2 million of capital. As of 1868, the company manufactured steel rails, employing 600 workers and producing 200 tons of rails per day.

Ogden served on the board of the Mississippi and Missouri Railroad and lobbied with many others for congressional approval and funding of the transcontinental railroad. After the 1862 Pacific Railroad Act, Ogden was named as the first president of the Union Pacific Railroad. Ogden was a good choice for the first president, but his railroad experience was most likely not the primary reason he was chosen; Ogden was a clever man who had many political connections. When Ogden came to lead the Union Pacific, the railroad was not fully funded and had not yet laid a single mile of track. The railroad existed largely on paper created by an act of Congress. As part of the 1862 Pacific Railroad Act, Congress named several existing railroad companies to complete portions of the project. Several key areas needed to link the East (Chicago) to the West had none, and hence the Union Pacific was formed by Congress.

During the early days of railroading Ogden had begun building Northwestern railroads connecting Chicago with cities like Janesville, Fond du Lac and St. Paul/St. Anthony. In 1856 this was the Chicago, St. Anthony and Fond du Lac Railroad but the financial panic beginning in 1857 caused the collapse of this project. Fortunately Ogden's long time personal reputation and character helped him get many supporters putting together resources to reorganize as the Chicago & North Western Railway the following year of which he was president from 1859 to 1868.

While his failing health precluded as active a participation as in his earlier years, his vice president, Perry Smith and Supt. George L Dunlap carried over from the Fond du Lac era, kept things progressing until 1864 when a Grand Consolidation took place with the Galena & Chicago Union Railroad. This new C&NW was able to cross Iowa to the Missouri River at Council Bluffs and join with Ogden's other project, the Union Pacific Transcontinental railroad in Omaha. By 1867 he could see his beloved Chicago connected by rail with California.

In the late-1860s, his business required him to spend time in New York. To accommodate this, he built a villa in 1866 next to the High Bridge in Fordham Heights. In the following two years, he expanded his property to 1,110 acres (450 ha) and a half-mile frontage along the Harlem River. He also continued to reside much of the year at his Chicago residence, which he also built an addition to around the same time.

Ogden was a fierce supporter of the transcontinental railroad at a time of great unrest for the country and was quoted as saying:

This project must be carried through by even-handed wise consideration and a patriotic course of policy which shall inspire capitalists of the country with confidence. Speculation is as fatal to it as secession is to the Union. Whoever speculates will damn this project.

As history now shows, eventually Ogden and many others got their wish.

=== Later life ===
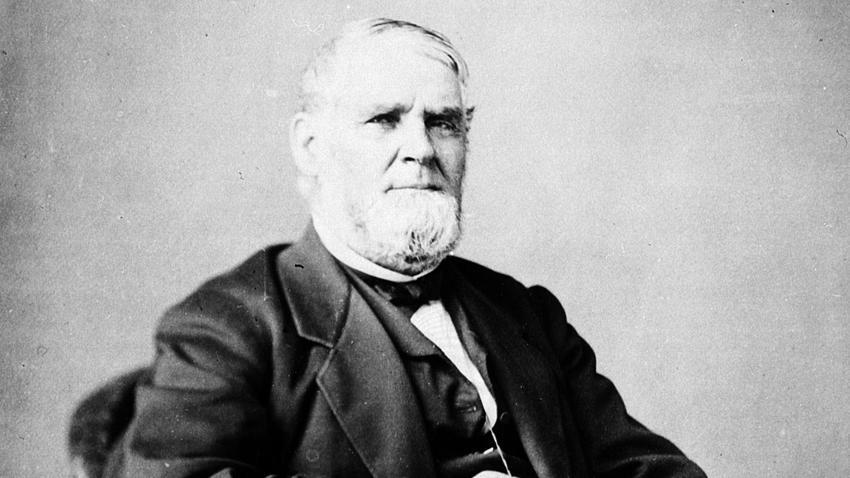
Ogden later in life

On October 8, 1871, Ogden lost most of his prized possessions in the Great Chicago Fire. He also owned a lumber company in Peshtigo, Wisconsin, which burned the same day.

== Personal life ==
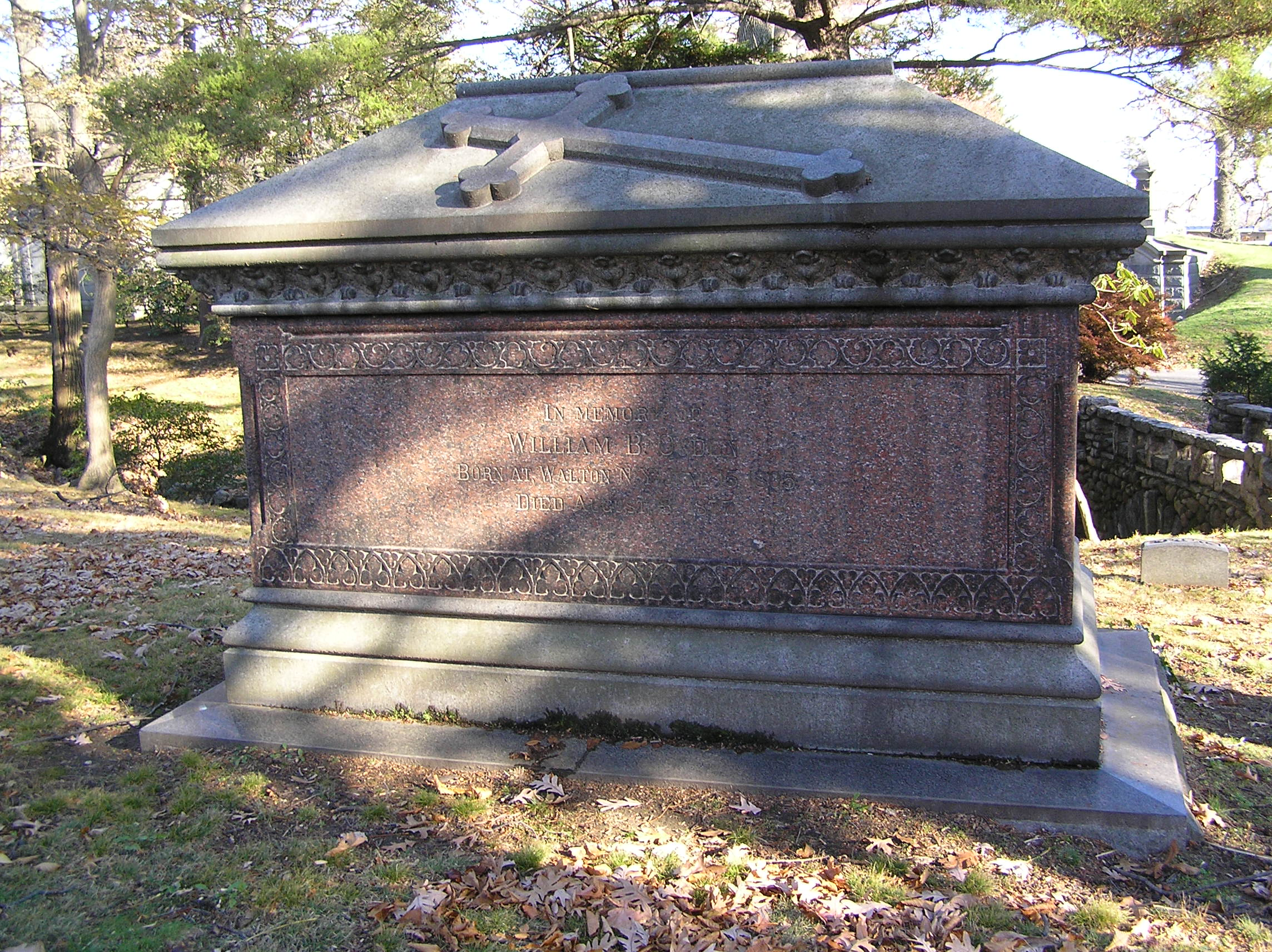
The sarcophagus of William Butler Ogden in Woodlawn Cemetery

He married Marianna Tuttle Arnot (1825–1904). Marianna was the daughter of Scottish born John Arnot and Harriet (née Tuttle) Arnot. In New York, he named his home in the Highbridge, Bronx (named after the bridge now called Aqueduct Bridge over the Harlem River connecting Manhattan and the Bronx) Villa Boscobel.

Ogden died at his home in the Bronx on Friday, August 3, 1877. The funeral was held August 6, 1877, with several prominent pallbearers including, Gouverneur Morris III, William A. Booth, Parke Godwin, Oswald Ottendorfer, William C. Sheldon, Martin Zborowski, and Andrew H. Green. He was interred at Woodlawn Cemetery, Bronx.

Ogden, who had no children, left behind an estate valued at $10 million (Note: equivalent to $302,343,750 in 2025) in 1877. Some of the money was used to fund a graduate school of science at the Old University of Chicago. Much was left to his niece Eleanor Wheeler, who married Alexander C. McClurg.

=== Legacy ===
Namesakes of William B. Ogden include a stretch of U.S. Highway 34, called Ogden Avenue in Chicago and its suburbs, Ogden International School of Chicago, which is located on Walton Street in Chicago, and Ogden Slip, a man-made harbor near the mouth of the Chicago River. Ogden Avenue in The Bronx is also named after him, as is Ogden, Iowa. The Arnot-Odgen Memorial Hospital, founded by his wife Mariana, also bears his namesake. Following his death, William B. Ogden left money to his hometown of Walton, New York, which was used for the construction of a library, completed in 1897, which bears his name, the William B. Ogden Free Library, and is still in use today.

A 1994 survey of experts on Chicago politics saw Ogden ranked as one of the ten best mayors in the city's history (up to that time).

== See also ==
- Ogden Plaza Park

== Works cited ==
- Merriner, James (2004). Grafters and Goo Goos: Corruption and Reform in Chicago, 1833-2003. Southern Illinois University Press. ISBN 0809325713.
