= Chicago Dock and Canal Company =

The Chicago Dock and Canal Company is a company established by William B. Ogden in 1857 which constructed civil works projects along the Chicago River. It currently operates as an equity-oriented real estate investment trust.

== History ==
The company was established in 1857. One of the major investors involved in its founding was former Chicago mayor William B. Ogden, who received help from his lawyer, Abraham Lincoln (who would later go on to serve as United States president), in establishing the company. Odgen successfully worked with Lincoln to gain titles to river and lakefront properties.

In 1861, the company constructed the Ogden Slip.

Ogden, who had no children of his own, left a large share of the company to his niece Eleanor Wheeler after his 1877 death. She married Alexander C. McClurg.

The company was the plaintiff in the 1913 United States Supreme Court case Chicago Dock & Canal Co. v. Fraley.

The company was owned by descendants of relatives of William B. Ogden into the 1980s. In 1962, the company reconstituted itself as a real estate trust. In the 1980s, the company began making the land they owned available for residential and commercial development. They partnered with the real estate arm of Equitable Life Assurance Society of the United States to form plans to redevelop their land in the vicinity of the Ogden Slip as Cityfront Center. This arrangement with Equitable had been in the works since the 1960s. Equitable had built the Equitable Building on adjacent property in the 1960s. Cityfront Center was a multi-billion dollar megadevelopment. Equitable Life Insurance and the Chicago Dock and Canal Company were originally going to act as co-developers of a joint venture. However, their joint venture dissolved in late 1985, with Equitable retaining eleven acres of land west of Columbus Drive, where they developed such components of Cityfront Center as the NBC Tower. The Chicago Dock and Canal Company retained control over the rest of the land.

The company, officially, continues to act as a Chicago-based equity oriented real estate investment trust. However, in functionality, it was absorbed by Daniel McLean's MCL Companies in 1987.
