= 111 South Wacker Drive =

Office skyscraper in Chicago, Illinois

Coordinates: 41°52′49″N 87°38′15″W

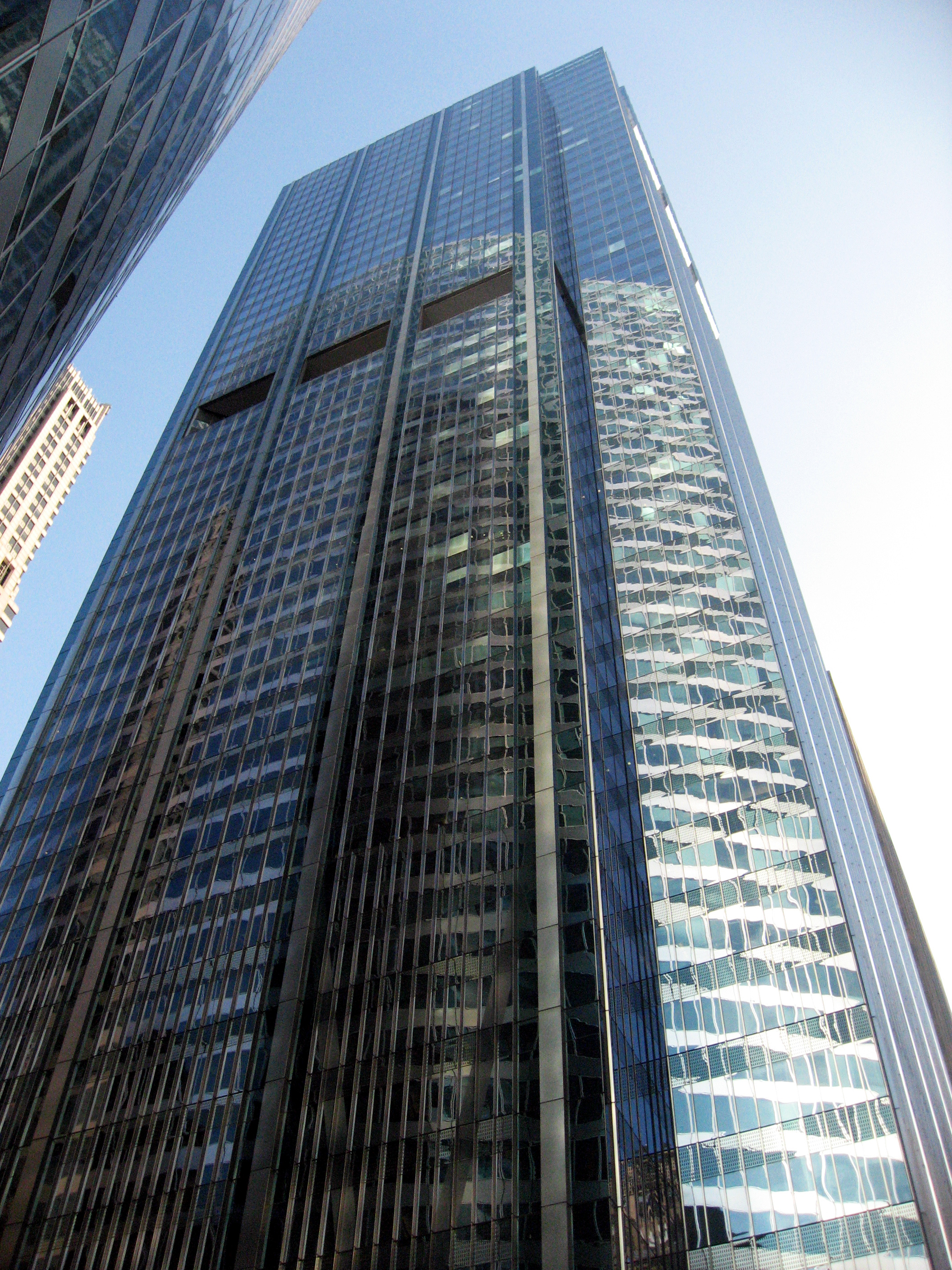
- Interactive map of the 111 South Wacker Drive area

General information
- Status: Completed
- Type: Office
- Location: Chicago, Illinois, United States
- Construction started: 2003
- Completed: 2005

Height
- Roof: 681 ft (208 m)
- Top floor: 669 ft (204 m)

Technical details
- Floor count: 51
- Floor area: 1,456,992 ft^{2} (135,359.0 m^{2})

Design and construction
- Architect: Goettsch Partners
- Developer: The John Buck Company
- Structural engineer: Magnusson Klemencic Associates
- Main contractor: Bovis Lend Lease

111 South Wacker Drive is a high-rise office building located in Chicago, Illinois. Completed in 2005 and standing at 681 feet (208 m), the 51 story blue-glass structure is one of the tallest in the city. It sits on the site of the former U.S. Gypsum Building, one of the tallest buildings in Chicago to be demolished.

Designed by Lohan Caprile Goettsch Architects, the building is noted for its unique parking ramp. The ramp's cyclical form creates a dramatic sloped ceiling for the building's main lobby underneath. The ramp's corkscrew design is reflected outside as well; the pavement follows the radiating lines set inside.

The building is also noteworthy for its sustainable design, becoming the first-ever project to be certified LEED-CS Gold by the U.S. Green Building Council.

== Original design ==
The original design called for a more extreme building. This 35 story, 638 foot (194 m) tower utilizes many of the existing caissons of the former U.S. Gypsum Building. The bulk of the building would be supported by a 120-foot (37 m) base and 20 large diagonal braces connected from the corners of the base to the bottom of the office structure. The effect would have been a nearly symmetrical shape and a building that seemingly looked unstable.

The minimalistic lobby would have been enclosed in glass and left space for an exterior plaza with artwork.

The plan was eventually abandoned with the current design chosen instead.

== Tenants ==
Tenants in the building include Deloitte, RR Donnelley, Harbor Funds, Wells Fargo Capital Finance, Bloomberg, Grippo & Elden LLC, Houlihan Lokey, and Locke Lord LLP.

Shelbourne Development, the firm behind the Chicago Spire, had 6,700-square-foot (620 m^{2}) of office space on the 50th floor but vacated their offices in 2010 due to a dispute over $27,600 in unpaid rent.

== See also ==
- List of skyscrapers
- List of tallest buildings in the United States
- List of tallest buildings in Chicago
- World's tallest structures
