= Fordham (surname) =

Fordham is an English surname. The name "Fordham" derives from the Anglo-Saxon (Old English) words ford, meaning a ford, and ham[m], which means a low-lying meadow by a source of water. Taken together, the name means a ford by a settlement or a wading place.

== Notable people ==
- Alan Fordham (born 1964), English cricketer
- Andy Fordham (1962–2021), English darts player
- Ben Fordham, Australian journalist
- Debra Fordham, American television producer and writer
- Elias Pym Fordham (1787–?), English-born surveyor of Indianapolis
- Elijah Fordham (1798–1879), member of The Church of Jesus Christ of Latter-day Saints
- Herbert Fordham (1854–1929), English cartographer
- Julia Fordham (born 1962), English singer-songwriter
- John Fordham (1388–1425), Bishop of Ely
- John Fordham, British jazz critic
- Kirk Fordham, American political campaign manager
- Michael Fordham (1905–1995), English psychiatrist
- Montague Fordham (1864–1948), British agriculturalist
- Robert Fordham (born 1942), Australian politician
- Rosie Fordham (born 2002), Australian cross-country skier
- Sharon Fordham, American Broadway theatrical producer
- Ted Fordham (born 1940), former Australian rules footballer
- Todd Fordham (born 1973), retired American Football player
- Tom Fordham (born 1974), retired American Major League baseball player
