= Garrett Kelleher =

Irish real estate developer and businessman

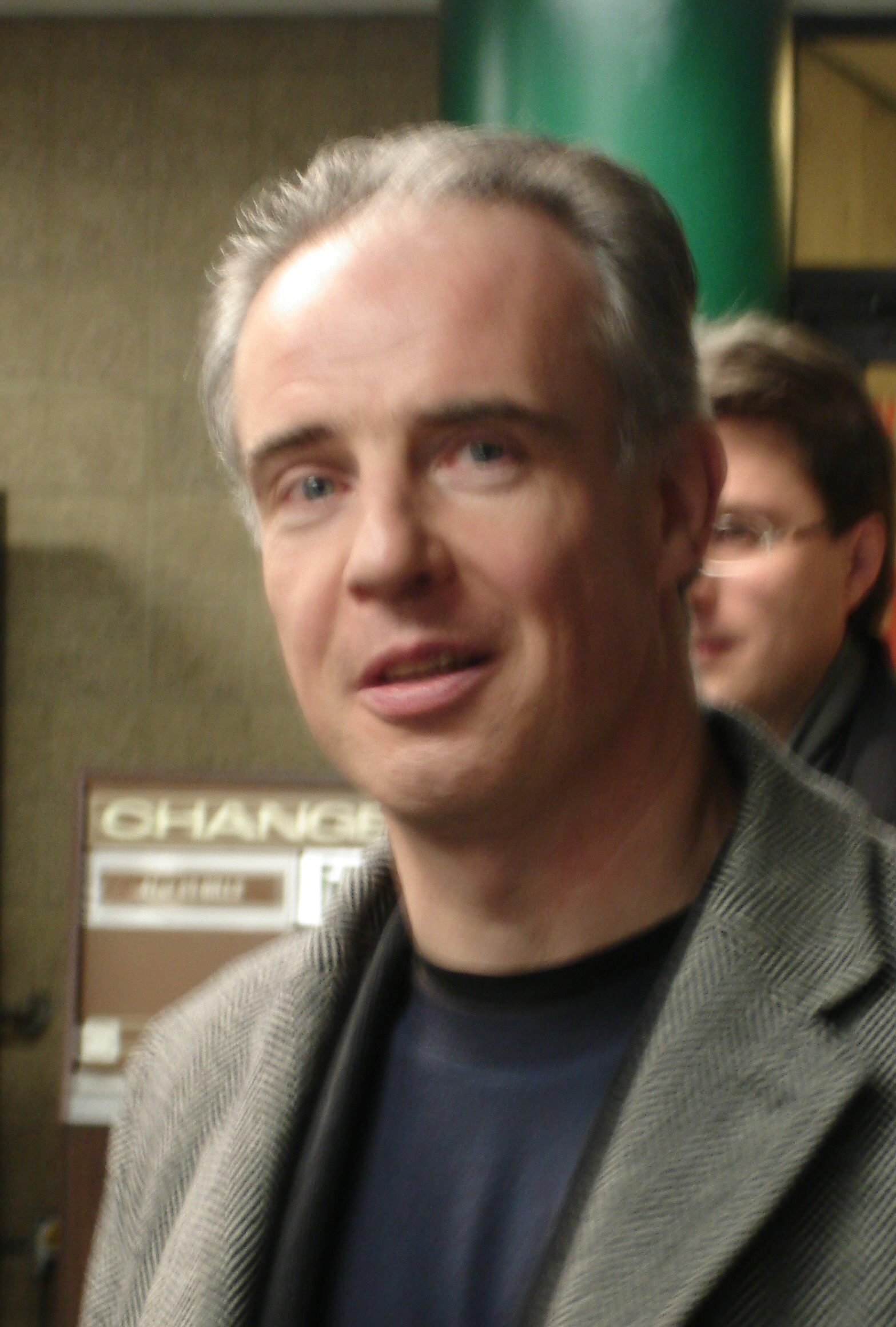
Garrett Kelleher in 2007

Garrett Kelleher is an Irish real estate developer and businessman with additional corporate interests in finance, film and education.

== Early life and education ==
Kelleher was born in Dublin, Ireland. Educated at Belvedere College, Kelleher first went to the United States on a tennis scholarship. He then studied mathematics at Trinity College Dublin.

== Career ==
After completing his education, Kelleher returned to the US in 1985 owning and running a contracting and development business primarily involved in loft conversion in Chicago, employing more than 120 people. He moved back to Dublin in 1996 and created Shelbourne Development, which focused primarily on core Dublin projects - redeveloping urban brownfield sites. Before the 2008 financial crisis, Shelbourne was active in the London, Paris and Brussels. Kelleher is based mainly in Chicago and Los Angeles while dealing with claims for almost €47 million sought by the National Asset Management Agency ('NAMA') back in Ireland.

Kelleher is also the non-executive director of Lightstream Pictures. Lightstream produced Max Rose, starring Jerry Lewis and Rampart with Woody Harrelson and has other projects in work.

Kelleher is the Executive Chairman of St Patrick's Athletic, financing their 2013 League of Ireland Premier Division and 2014, 2021 & 2023 FAI Cup winning campaigns.

At the request of Mayor Daley, Garrett was involved with Chicago's 2016 bid for the Olympics.

In July 2006 Kelleher stepped in and bought a site at the intersection of the Chicago River and Lake Michigan after an earlier developer failed to close on the land. The 2.2-acre (8,900 m^{2}) site would have housed the now-cancelled Chicago Spire. It would have been the tallest building in the US, and the world's tallest exclusively residential building. However, having started construction in 2007, his development company, Shelbourne Development Ltd, ran into financial difficulties during the 2008 financial crisis and failed to secure further funding. The project eventually collapsed causing large losses for Shelbourne's creditors and the site was signed over to a creditor as part of bankruptcy processing in 2014.

Kelleher sits on the Board of Regents at Ave Maria University in Florida. Opened in 2003 the university recognizes the importance of creating and maintaining an environment in which faith informs the life of the community. Kelleher also held the Chairmanship of Legatus in Ireland in 2006 which has aims of "To study live and spread the Faith in our business, professional and personal lives".

Kelleher is a large shareholder in Dolmen Securities which was recently purchased by Cantor Fitzgerald. Kelleher sat on the advisory board of the US-Ireland Alliance.

Kelleher was involved in multiple lawsuits against NAMA including, in early 2018, launching a US$1.2 billion lawsuit via a 60-page complaint lodged with the Federal District Court in Illinois, USA; alleging that the agency destroyed the developer's chances of building the Chicago Spire through a combination of "sheer spite" and "consistent incompetence" on the part of certain of its officials. The case was dismissed in 2019.

== Personal life ==
Garrett is married to Maeve Kelleher, and they have seven children. Maeve is or has been on the board of some of Garrett Kelleher's companies.
