= Sharon Fordham =

American theatrical producer and businessperson

Sharon Fordham is an American Broadway theatrical producer, entrepreneur, venture capitalist, and angel investor.

== Early life and education ==
Sharon earned a bachelor's degree from Douglass College at Rutgers University and an MBA from the Wharton School of Business at the University of Pennsylvania.

== Overview ==
Sharon is a producer of Jill Santoriello's Broadway musical adaptation of 'A Tale of Two Cities' opening for preview on August 19, 2008, at the Al Hirschfeld Theatre in New York.

In addition to her work as a Broadway producer, Sharon is an angel investor and Principal of The Fordham Group, an early investment company focusing on investments in the technology area.

Previously, she was CEO and board member of WeightWatchers.com, Inc., Recently, WeightWatchers.com was bought by the licensor, Weight Watchers International.

Prior to her time as CEO of WeightWatchers.com, Sharon held several executive positions at Nabisco, including President of Global e-Business, President of the LifeSavers Company (Nabisco subsidiary) and Senior Vice President of marketing for Nabisco's flagship division, the Nabisco Biscuit Company.

While at Nabisco, Sharon pioneered the emerging advertising genre of "advergaming", with the launch of Nabisco's gaming web sites, Candystand.com and Nabiscoworld.com.

== Production credits ==
- A Tale of Two Cities
