= Ogden Slip =

Artificial harbor in Chicago, Illinois

Coordinates: 41°53′25″N 87°36′54″W

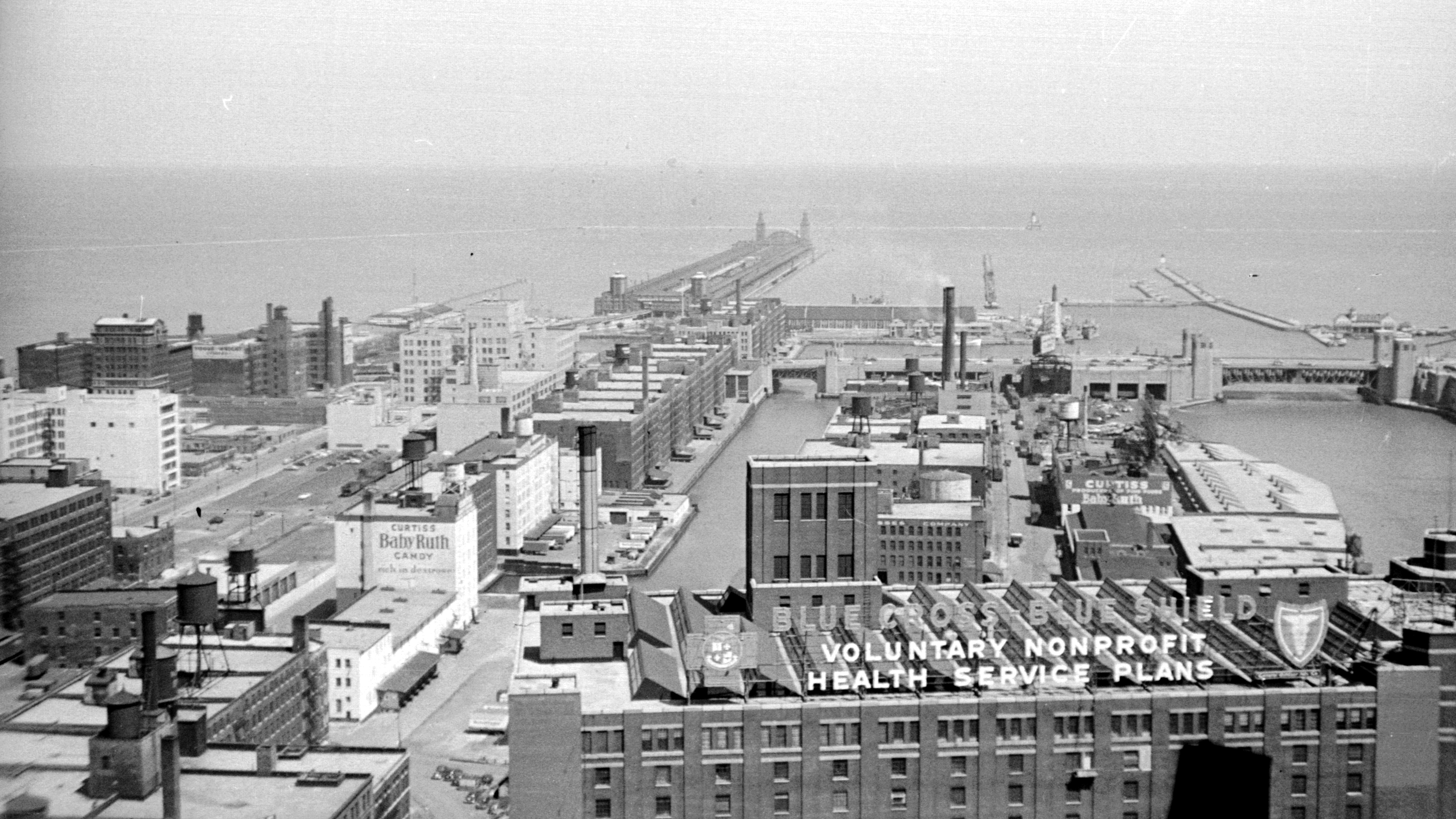
Ogden Slip in 1950, viewed from above looking towards Navy Pier

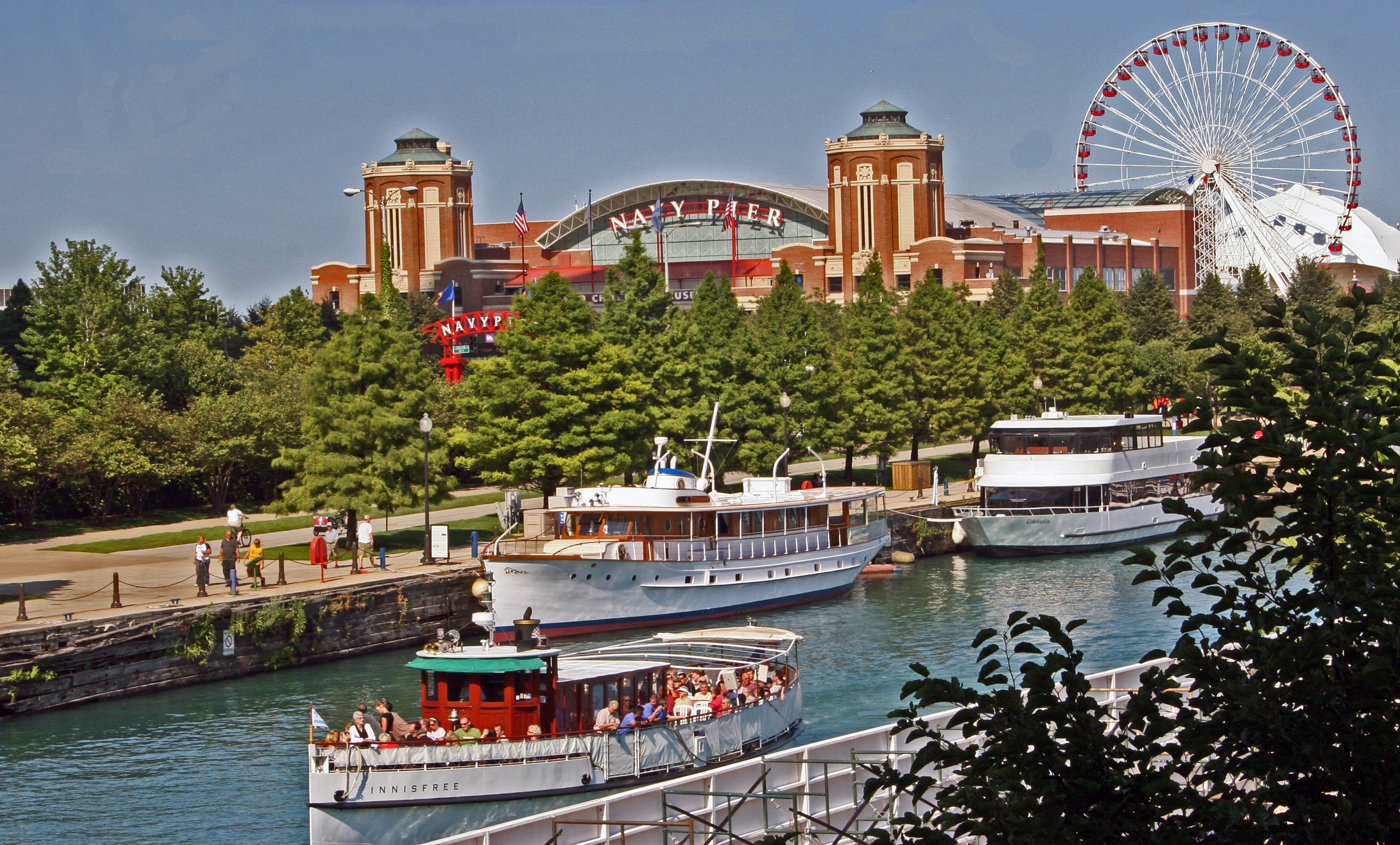
View of Ogden Slip in 2007 (looking towards Navy Pier)

The Ogden Slip is a canal and harbor in Chicago, Illinois that was constructed in the 1861 by William B. Ogden's Chicago Dock and Canal Company. It was long surrounded by warehouses. Today, it is surrounded by mixed-use and residential developments.

== History ==
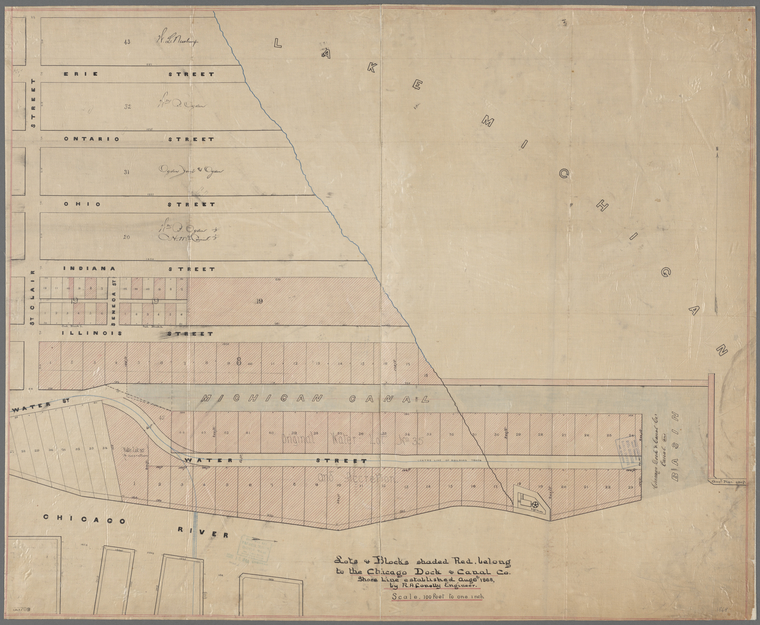
Plat of the Ogden slip, 1868

In 1861, Chicago Dock and Canal Company constructed the Odgen Slip. It was among many real estate investments that the company made that were overseen by William B. Ogden. The slip was constructed with approval by the United States Department of War. The slip parallels the North Bank of the Chicago River, and was utilized as a harbor, and was home to warehouses well into the twentieth century.

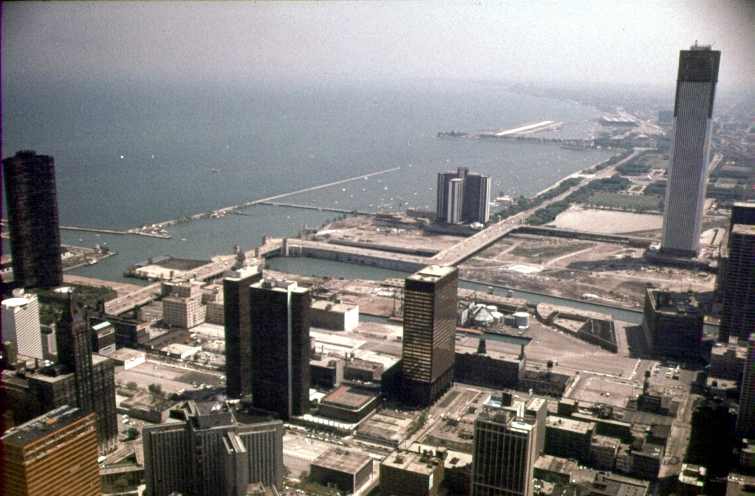
Ogden Slip in 1973

By the 1960s, formal discussions were had by the Chicago Dock and Canal Company about redeveloping the real estate surrounding the slip. By the mid-1980s, redevelopment around the slip was being formally planned. The Chicago Dock and Canal Trust was still controlled by William B. Ogden's descendants, and made their property in the area available for residential and commercial development as part of the planned Cityfront Center development. The abutting Pugh Terminal building (originally built between 1905 and 1920) was renovated into "North Pier", a retail complex.

== Ogden Slip view corridor ==
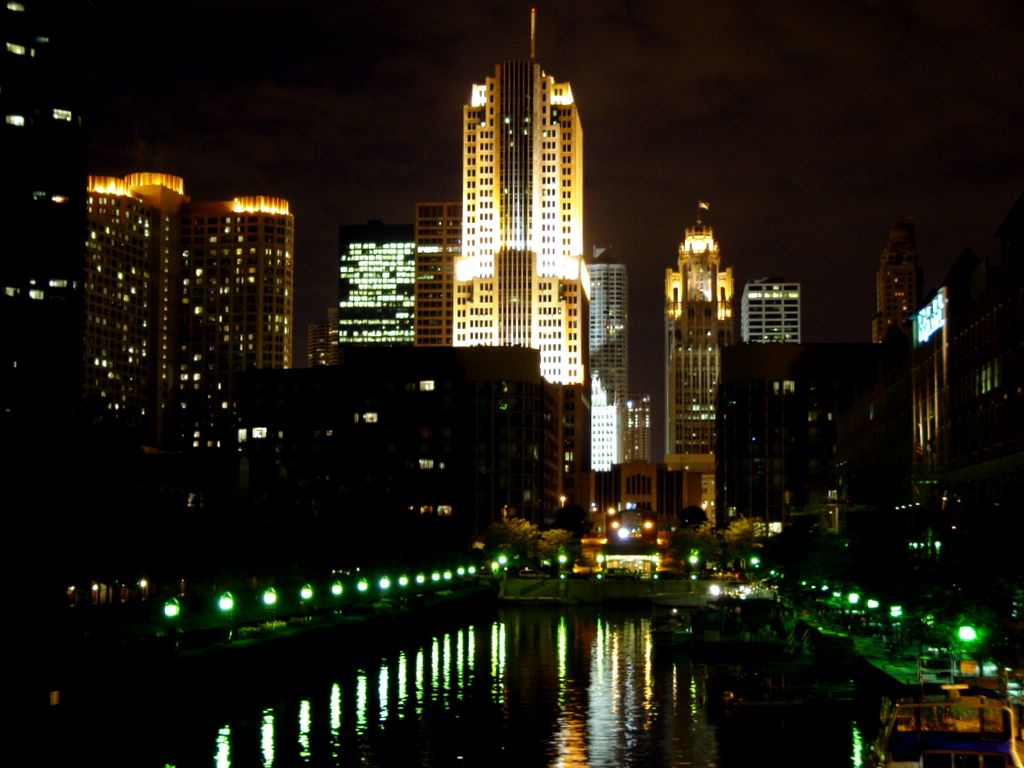
Night view (photographed in 2003) with the Tribune Tower visible through the view corridor

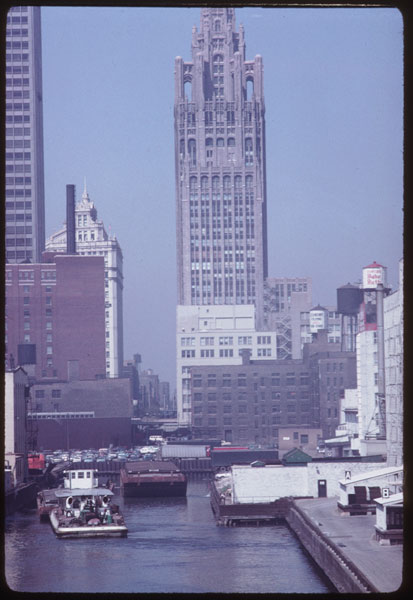
1966 photograph, showing a view of Tribune Tower from the Ogden slip. The "Ogden Slip view corridor" was created to preserve this view.

The so-called "Ogden Slip view corridor" was created in the mid-1980s. When the redevelopment of the real estate near and surrounding the Ogden Slip was taking place, the city adopted a policy to preserve a view of the top of the Tribune Tower from Lake Shore Drive through a sight corridor aligned with the slip. Several subsequently constructed buildings (such as NBC Tower, Loews Hotel Tower, and 465 North Park) have had their designs influenced by this policy.

== See also ==
- DuSable Park (Chicago)
