= Fordham Company =

Real estate development company

- Industry: real estate development
- Founded: 1988; 37 years ago
- Headquarters: Chicago, Illinois
- Key people: Christopher T. Carley (chairman)

The Fordham Company is a real estate development company founded in 1988 and based in Chicago, Illinois. The company's chairman is Christopher T. Carley. As of 2015 they had developed over 16,000 residential units.

The company owns several skyscrapers and buildings in downtown Chicago including "65 East Goethe," The Fordham, and The Pinnacle. The Fordham Company also began development of the 2,000-foot-tall (610 m) Fordham Spire project, which was purchased by Shelbourne Development and renamed the Chicago Spire. The Spire was never completed. Fordham was also involved in the development of the unbuilt Waldorf-Astoria Hotel and Residence Tower.
