= Chicago Spire =

Canceled building in Chicago, Illinois

- Artist's impression of the megatall Chicago Spire

General information
- Status: Never built
- Type: Residential
- Location: Lake Shore Drive; Chicago, Illinois, United States
- Coordinates: 41°53′23.6″N 87°36′53.6″W
- Construction started: June 25, 2007
- Construction stopped: 2008

Height
- Tip: 2,000 ft (610 m)
- Roof: 2,000 ft (610 m)
- Top floor: 1,865 ft (568 m)

Technical details
- Floor count: 150
- Floor area: 3,000,000 square feet (278,700 m^{2})

Design and construction
- Architects: Santiago Calatrava; Perkins and Will
- Developer: Shelbourne Development Group
- Structural engineer: Thornton Tomasetti
- Main contractor: Case Foundation

Chicago Spire is a cancelled skyscraper project that was partially built between 2007 and 2008 located at 400 Lake Shore in Chicago. If completed, it would have stood 2,000 feet (610 m) high with 150 floors and would have been the tallest building in the Western Hemisphere. When proposed as the Fordham Spire in July 2005, the design had 116 stories, included a hotel and condominiums, and was topped with a broadcast antenna mast. The building was designed and spearheaded by Spanish architect-engineer Santiago Calatrava and Chicago developer Christopher T. Carley of the Fordham Company. On March 16, 2006, the Chicago Plan Commission unanimously approved the initial design of the building. Construction started but the Great Recession began in late 2007. On November 4, 2014, a court ruling brought the original development plan and the extended litigation over the nine-year-old project to a close. Developer Garrett Kelleher signed over the property location to the project's biggest creditor, Related Midwest, who announced that they would not build the Spire and made plans for the two tower 400 Lake Shore by David Childs.

== Planning ==
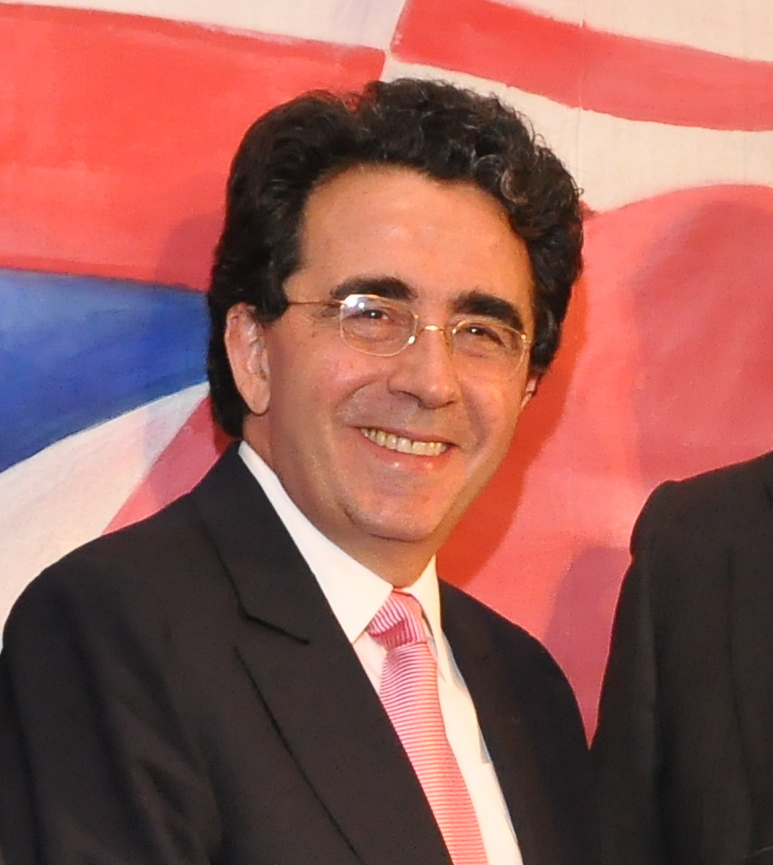
Architect Santiago Calatrava

Christopher T. Carley of the Fordham Company proposed the Fordham Spire in July 2005. In the proposal the Spire was to be a 116-story structure with hotel and condominiums topped by a tall broadcast antenna mast. The initial design of the building was passed unanimously by the Chicago Plan Commission on March 16, 2006, and by the Chicago Zoning Committee on March 23, 2006. On March 29, 2006, the Chicago City Council also approved the building's design. As part of the approval process, the council passed a measure that raised the height limit on structures at the site to accommodate the 2,000-foot (610 m) design height. The Fordham Spire would have become the second tallest building in the entire world, surpassed only by the Burj Khalifa, and would have become the tallest freestanding structure as well as the tallest building in the Western Hemisphere, surpassing the CN Tower in Toronto.

The building was designed by Spanish architect Santiago Calatrava and was being developed by Garrett Kelleher of Shelbourne Development Group, Inc., the then-owner of St Patrick's Athletic F.C.

Chicago Mayor Richard M. Daley approved of the design, stating that it was environmentally friendly. Burton F. Natarus, who was the 42nd-ward alderman when the building was announced, said, "This is a very unique opportunity for the city of Chicago. This building belongs to Chicago and should be in Chicago." Donald Trump immediately voiced opposition to the building, stating that the tall structure would be a target for terrorists and did not even seem to be a viable project.

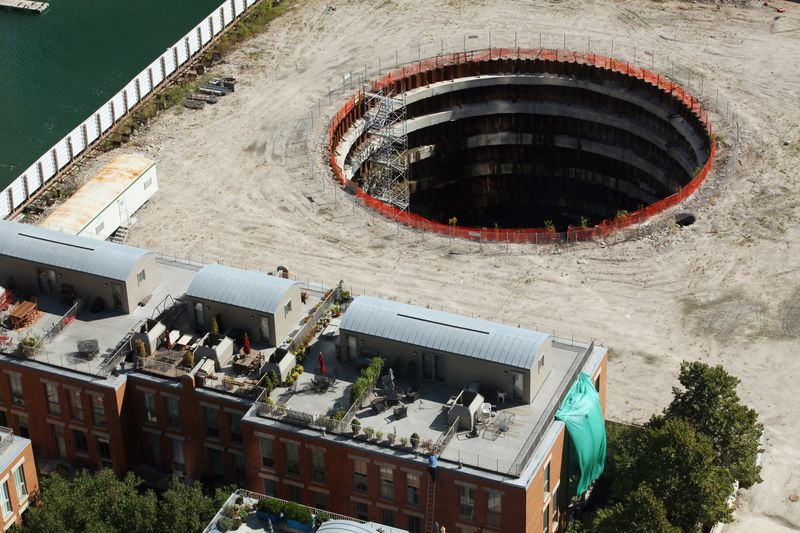
State of construction in 2010

== Development ==
=== Initial financial problems ===
After several months of development in 2005, Carley failed to obtain sufficient financing for the construction of the building. Irish developer Garrett Kelleher, executive chairman of Shelbourne Development Group, Inc., acquired the land and took over the project. It was announced that he would put up 100% of the equity, something Carley had been unable to do. He also had the financial backing to acquire the land, something Carley lacked. Kelleher stated he would consider using Carley's services on the development and that "Carley will be paid an unspecified sum for his involvement in the deal so far." Kelleher later renamed the project "Chicago Spire" after briefly going by "400 North Lake Shore Drive", as it was no longer a Fordham project.

=== New designs ===
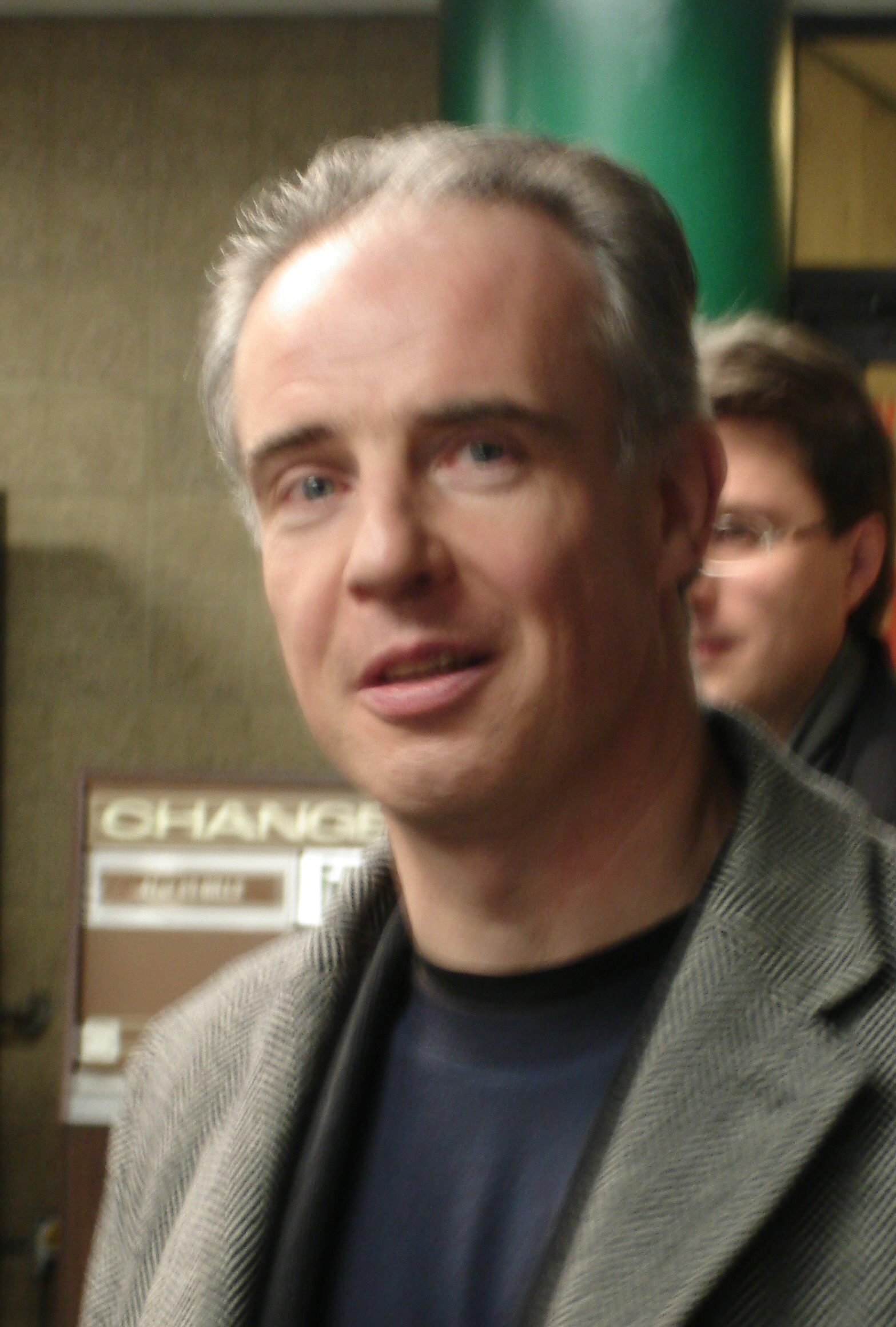
Garrett Kelleher

In the final quarter of 2006, Shelbourne Development issued two separate press releases regarding the construction and design of the spire. A November 2006 press release stated that construction of the Chicago Spire would begin in June 2007. In early December 2006, Shelbourne Development issued another press release stating that the design of the building had been revised. This included the removal of the hotel and the antenna mast, making the building consist solely of condominium units. The design change altered the building design such that it was wider than the original plan. Additionally, the spire no longer tapered at the top, resulting in an increase in floor space and overall floor count. The revision also removed the separate parking structure from the original plan, instead incorporating underground parking into the spire itself. This first major redesign of the Chicago Spire was criticized by architectural critics and city officials.

In late December 2006, the Chicago Tribune reported that the developer was soliciting opinions on a further revision from community leaders. Several weeks following that report the Chicago Tribune held an exclusive interview with architect Santiago Calatrava and lead developer Garrett Kelleher. During the interview, Calatrava drew out design ideas restoring the rotating design of the building and showcasing his vision for the Chicago Spire's lobby. On March 26, 2007, further revisions were shown during a public presentation by Shelbourne Development showcasing the most recent design.

=== Approval ===
Following the March 26, 2007 public presentation by Shelbourne Development, residents showed a favorable reaction to the newest design of the Chicago Spire. The Chicago Plan Commission approved the final plans of the Chicago Spire on April 19, 2007. Chicago's zoning committee also approved the tower on April 26 and, on May 9, 2007, the Chicago City Council approved the final design of the Chicago Spire.

=== Marketing ===
By June 2008, Shelbourne had sold more than 350 of the 1,193 units—more than half of those to foreign investors in markets where certain United States Securities and Exchange Commission regulations do not apply. Shelbourne announced on September 30, 2008 that the building's penthouse had been sold to Beanie Babies manufacturer Ty Warner. Kelleher offered to rent out units at a guaranteed 7.5% return to spur sales. The approach is common outside the United States where the tower was marketed more heavily and was meant to spur sales of the smallest units, which are the most likely to be purchased as rental property investments by foreigners.

=== Financial crisis and suspension of construction ===
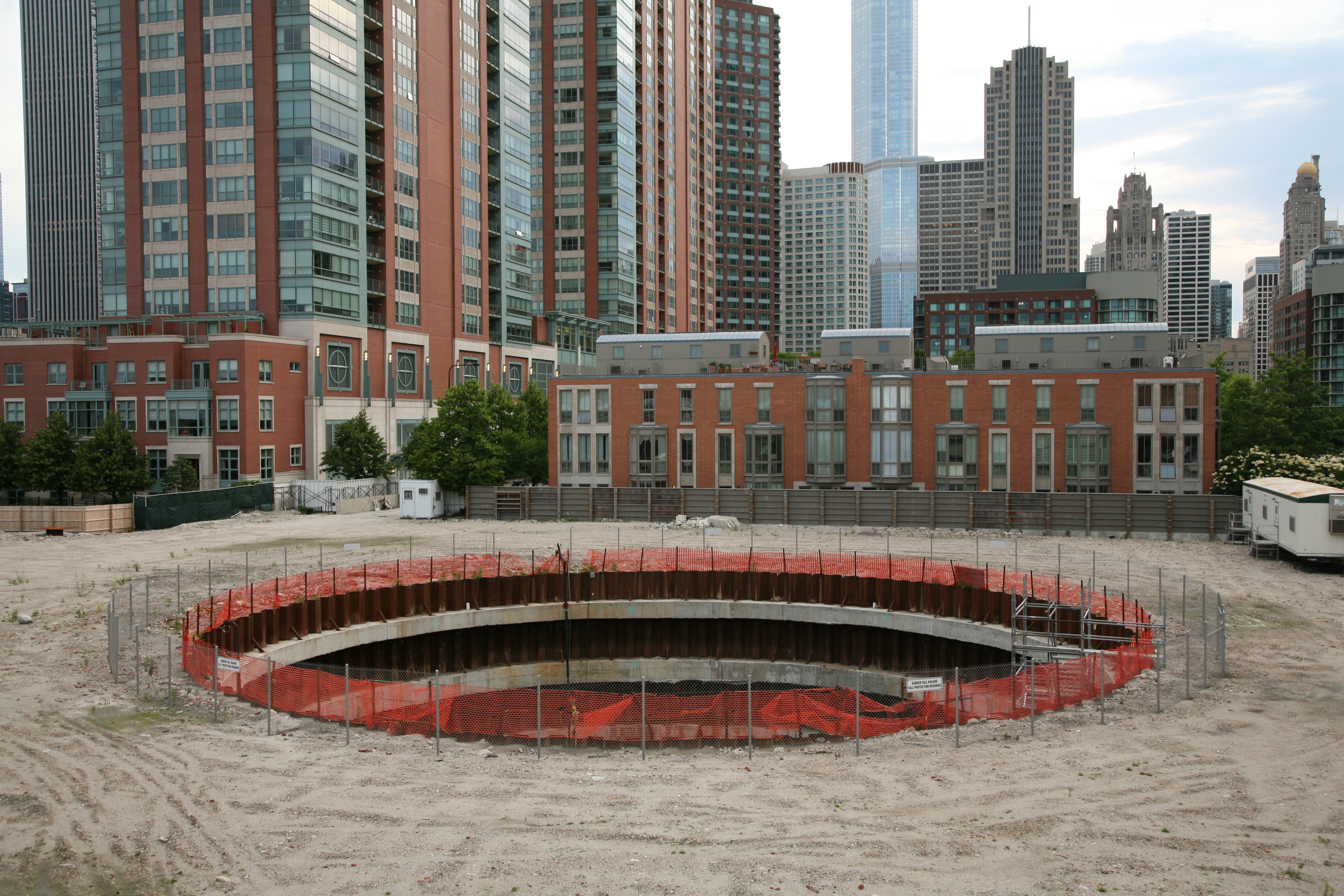
The construction site had been dormant since late 2008.

By October 2008, the late-2000s recession was beginning to affect the project. Construction was suspended and the tower's architect, Santiago Calatrava, placed an $11.34 million lien on the construction site, stating that Kelleher had not yet paid him for his work. Within a few months Anglo Irish Bank, the primary lender for the project, was on the brink of financial collapse. The bank's stocks had lost nearly all of their value and Anglo Irish Bank was facing nationalization. Due to the bank's dire financial situation, Shelbourne Development was forced to suspend construction, and would eventually have to pay back the $69.5 million (USD) it had already borrowed.

Additional litigation and liens threatened the project by autumn 2009. The owner of the NBC Tower in Chicago sued to evict Shelbourne Development from their sales office, where extensive modeling of Chicago Spire units had been installed. The lawsuit alleged that Shelbourne was behind $316,000 (USD) in lease payments. In addition to this and other liens listed on the property, Bank of America filed a lawsuit against Shelbourne Development for $4.92 million (USD). The lawsuit was an attempt to collect that sum on two unpaid loans used for initial construction at the Chicago Spire site.

After these setbacks, the AFL–CIO and Kelleher announced in late 2009 that they were discussing the potential for a $170 million (USD) land loan that would retire Kelleher's loan from Anglo Irish Bank, pay off the outstanding liens, and restart work in exchange for making the construction a complete union job. Due to the lack of construction and the sluggish economy, Chicago unions were desperate to find work for their employees as they faced near 30% unemployment. Construction of the Chicago Spire would have provided approximately 900 full-time jobs to union members for four years if construction had resumed. In addition to the $194 million (USD) that Kelleher has invested personally in the project already, backup financing of an unspecified amount and from an unknown source in the form of mezzanine capital and bridge loans has been guaranteed and would have kicked in automatically if the $170 million (USD) AFL-CIO loan had been secured.

But within weeks of the official announcement that Kelleher was searching for union bailouts, four major labor union investment funds declined to offer Shelbourne Development any loans. Kelleher continued to search for financing. Shelbourne Development faced eviction from its offices on the 50th floor of 111 South Wacker Drive on which Shelbourne owed $27,600 in unpaid rent. Earlier in the year, the spire's Chicago sales office had been ejected from the nearby NBC Tower.

In October 2010 Anglo Irish Bank Corp. filed a $77 million foreclosure lawsuit against Kelleher, claiming that loans made to Kelleher's development company had been in default for a year. The bank was expected to take possession of the site. By the end of the year, courts handed control of the site to a receiver, leaving the project (at the time) dead. In addition, two Chicago firms purchased the tax lien certificates on the property.

=== End of the project ===
In 2013, with the Chicago Spire site for sale by Ireland's National Asset Management Agency (NAMA), interest resumed, drawing in at least a half-dozen offers for the property. Under the involuntary bankruptcy ruling in October 2013, Shelbourne had until the end of March 2014 to obtain approval of a reorganization plan, and was considering a bid to take back control of the property, reigniting hope that the skyscraper might actually be built.

However, on October 31, 2014, the developer failed to make a required payment to Related Midwest and Related filed suit to compel Shelbourne to turn over the deed to the property. On November 4, 2014, Garrett Kelleher signed over the property located at 400 N. Lake Shore Drive to Related Midwest. President Curt Bailey said that Related Midwest would not build the Spire.

In February 2016, Shelbourne sought court approval to take up an offer of up to $135 million from Atlas Apartment Holdings intended to underpin the project's emergence from bankruptcy, with a deadline of August 31, 2016 for having a court-approved reorganization plan. At a hearing on March 11, 2016, Shelbourne announced that it had reached agreement on a repayment plan with the project's creditors, including Related Midwest, which had bought up much of the project's debt. Assuming the project finds funding to satisfy that agreement, Atlas said that the building would be built and that Atlas would control the project, but that Kelleher would still be the developer, with the intention of building the same building planned prior to the suspension of construction.

In early 2018, the former developer Garrett Kelleher launched a $1.2 billion (USD) lawsuit, in the US Federal District Court in Illinois, against NAMA alleging that the agency destroyed his chances of building the Chicago Spire through a combination of "sheer spite" and "consistent incompetence". The lawsuit is formally brought by Kelleher's company, Shelbourne North Water Street Corporation.

=== Future site development ===
Location map

In 2016, Crain's Chicago Business reported that Related Midwest had hired former SOM architect Michael Pfeffer to guide the design of developments on the former Chicago Spire site. Although President Curt Bailey disclosed no project details—such as whether, for example, Related Midwest plans to build one big tower or multiple structures on the site—he did announce the development firm's intent to discuss plan outlines with the public in 2017.

In 2018, it was revealed that Related Midwest will build two skyscrapers at the site of the Spire. The taller of the two would include 300 condominiums and a 175-room luxury hotel and the other 550 apartments. The two tower plan has been approved by the city and the development will be called 400 Lake Shore Drive.

== Location ==
The skyscraper was being constructed at 400 N. Lake Shore Drive, on Chicago's waterfront west of Navy Pier and northeast of the Loop, in the Streeterville neighborhood of the Near North Side community area. The site is at the junction of Lake Michigan and the Chicago River, and is bordered by the Ogden Slip of the Chicago River to the north, North Lake Shore Drive to the east, the Chicago River to the south, and existing residential property to the west. The site was originally zoned for two 35 to 50-story buildings. Originally, it was to be sold by a joint venture of LR Development Company of Chicago and JER Partners of Virginia for $64 million to Christopher Carley of the Fordham Company. After numerous short-term extensions, and later Carley's failure to obtain financing, Kelleher of Shelbourne Development purchased the land instead and pledged to finance the rest of the project.

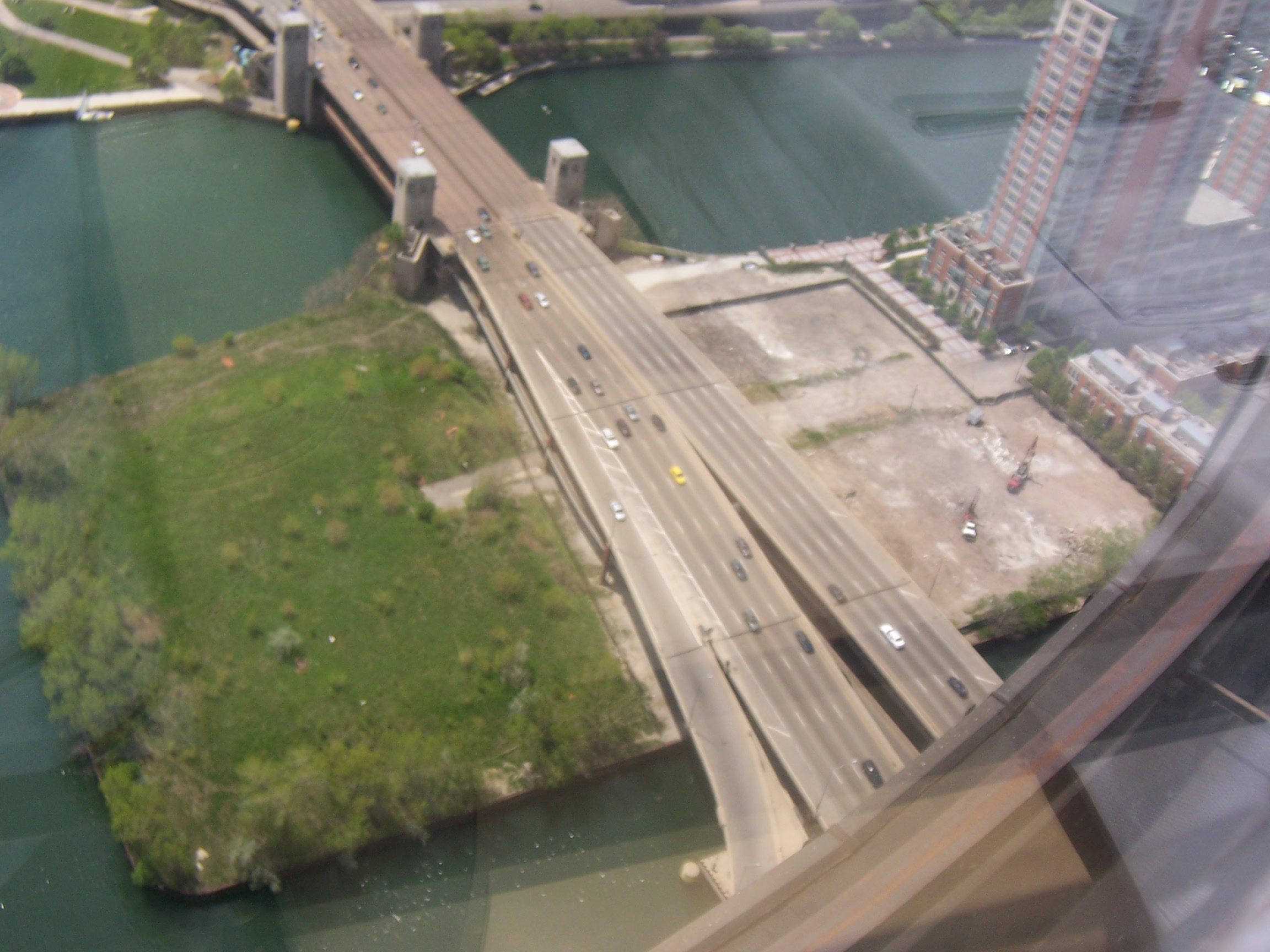
Chicago Spire site and DuSable Park prior to construction in 2007.

=== DuSable Park ===
When the project was first announced, the Fordham Company pledged almost $500,000 to assist in the development of the city's proposed DuSable Park, which would adjoin the property of the Chicago Spire. DuSable Park would cover 3.24 acres (1.31 ha) and a $11.4 million budget was planned for its renovation. On March 26, 2007, Shelbourne pledged to pay $6 million toward the development of the park, making up the deficit left over from the city's own initial pledge of $6 million and far exceeding the Fordham Co's initial offer. In May 2007 Shelbourne's pledge jumped to $9.6 million. Soil tests performed in December 2000 on the soil of the proposed park showed contamination of radioactive thorium. Thorium was used by the Lindsay Light Company, which operated a location nearby. After the closing of the location in the 1930s, contaminated soil was dumped on the location of the proposed park. In March 2003, the Chicago Park District stated that the thorium clean-up on that land was incomplete. Hazards of contamination can be avoided by laying a minimum of 6 inches (15 cm) of concrete over any affected soil, an approach that would be more feasible for the site of the Chicago Spire than for the adjacent park.

In 2012 the Chicago Park District received funding from the EPA for remediation of the site, bagging the radioactive soil and shipping it to a Superfund site. By summer 2013 the Park District website reported the remediation had been completed by September 2012.

== Architecture ==
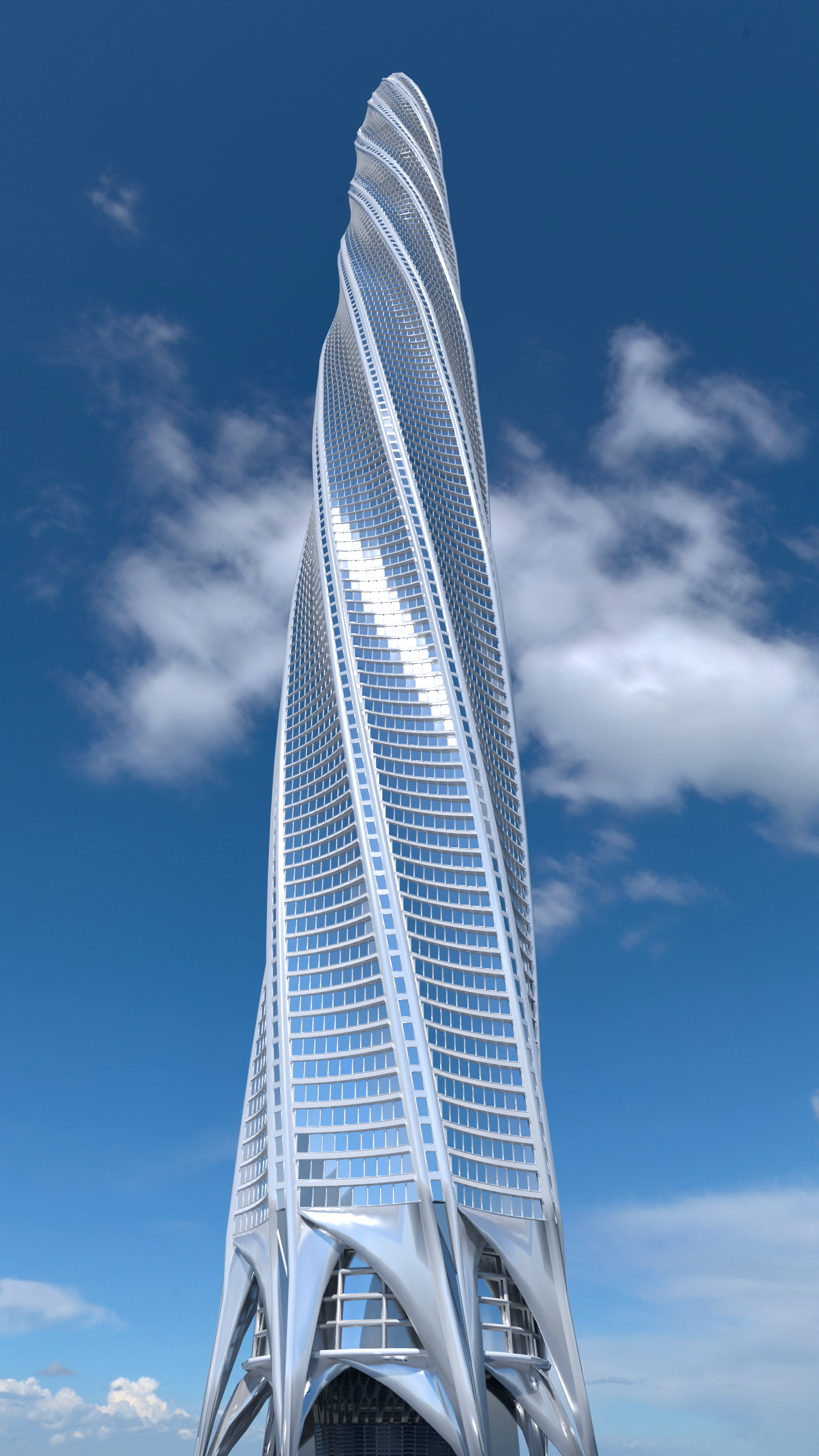
The Chicago Spire's exterior design.

As with many of his designs, Calatrava was inspired by themes and designs in nature for the tall, twisting skyscraper. He likened the structure to an imaginary smoke spiral coming from a campfire near the Chicago River lit by Native Americans indigenous to the area, and also related the building's newly designed pinnacle to the "graceful" and "rotating forms" of a snail shell.

Standing at 2,000 feet (610 m), the Chicago Spire would have further transformed the always-growing Chicago skyline. Plans for the tower included 1,193 condominiums with each of the building's 150 stories rotated 2.4 degrees from the one below it for a total 360-degree rotation. In February 2008, prices for the condominiums were announced as ranging from $750,000 to US$40 million. For supplemental structural support, each floor was to be surrounded by cantilevered corners and four concave sides. Similar to the Willis Tower (formerly Sears Tower) and John Hancock Center observation decks, the Chicago Spire design included a community room on the top floor offering residents a view of four U.S. states. The design for the soaring four story lobby of the skyscraper included translucent glass walls framed by arching, steel-reinforced concrete vaults. The building has been described as a giant "drill bit" by the public and others in the media have likened it to a "tall twisting tree" and a "blade of grass".

The curved design offered two major benefits to the structure of the building. First, curved designs, such as that found in Calatrava's Turning Torso in Malmö, Sweden, tend to add to the strength of a structure. A similar principle has been used in the past with curved stadium roofs. In addition to structural support, the curved face of the exterior would minimize wind forces. In rectangular buildings, a fluid wind flow puts pressure on the windward face of the building; while air moves around it, a suction is applied to the leeward face. This often causes a sway in tall buildings usually counteracted, at least partially, by stiffening the structure or by using a dynamic wind damper. Since the curved design of the Chicago Spire would not completely negate wind forces, a tapering concrete core and twelve shear walls radiating from it were planned to counteract the remaining wind load.

Additionally, the Chicago Spire was designed with world-class sustainable engineering practices to meet Leadership in Energy and Environmental Design Gold recognition. Sustainable features included recycled rainwater, river water used for cooling, ornithologically-sensitive glass to protect migratory birds, intelligent building and management systems, waste storage and recycling management, and monitored outdoor air delivery.

== Construction ==
Following the city approval, it was announced that construction of the Chicago Spire was to begin in the summer of 2007, with caisson work scheduled to begin as early as June 2007. DuSable Park was designated as a staging area for the construction of the tower. The sales center for the Chicago Spire opened on January 14, 2008.

On September 19, 2008, a spokeswoman for the developer announced that construction was continuing on the building, but that the pace of construction would be slowed until the financial markets recovered from the subprime mortgage crisis. Kelleher promised that he still had financial backing, although analysts questioned the ability of the project to survive the current economic decline. A contractor to build the building's superstructure had not yet been named. The October 1, 2008 edition of The Wall Street Journal said that the building foundation was complete and the above ground construction would not continue until the markets recover. The Spire has remained a fenced-off hole in the ground at 400 N. Lake Shore Drive since 2008. But before Shelbourne faced financial difficulties and was forced into bankruptcy, about 370 of the planned 1,200 luxury condos were sold, half of which were to people outside the U.S., according to the suit. “Shelbourne remains the only person logically capable of completing it because it still owns the intellectual property necessary to construct it and it still maintains the goodwill of the diverse governmental and community interests without which a project of this dimension would be doomed,” the lawsuit states.

=== Underground phase ===
Crane parts and construction equipment arrived at the site on June 25, 2007. The following day Shelbourne Development officially announced the first construction contract. In preparation for construction, 34 concrete and steel caissons were drilled 120 feet (37 m) into bedrock underground; this was completed June 25, 2008. A cofferdam with a 104 foot (32 m) diameter and 78 foot (24 m) depth was installed to create a work environment and would have later acted as a foundation for the building's core. Utility upgrades were planned for the surrounding neighborhood.

=== Images ===
View of the site in 1963

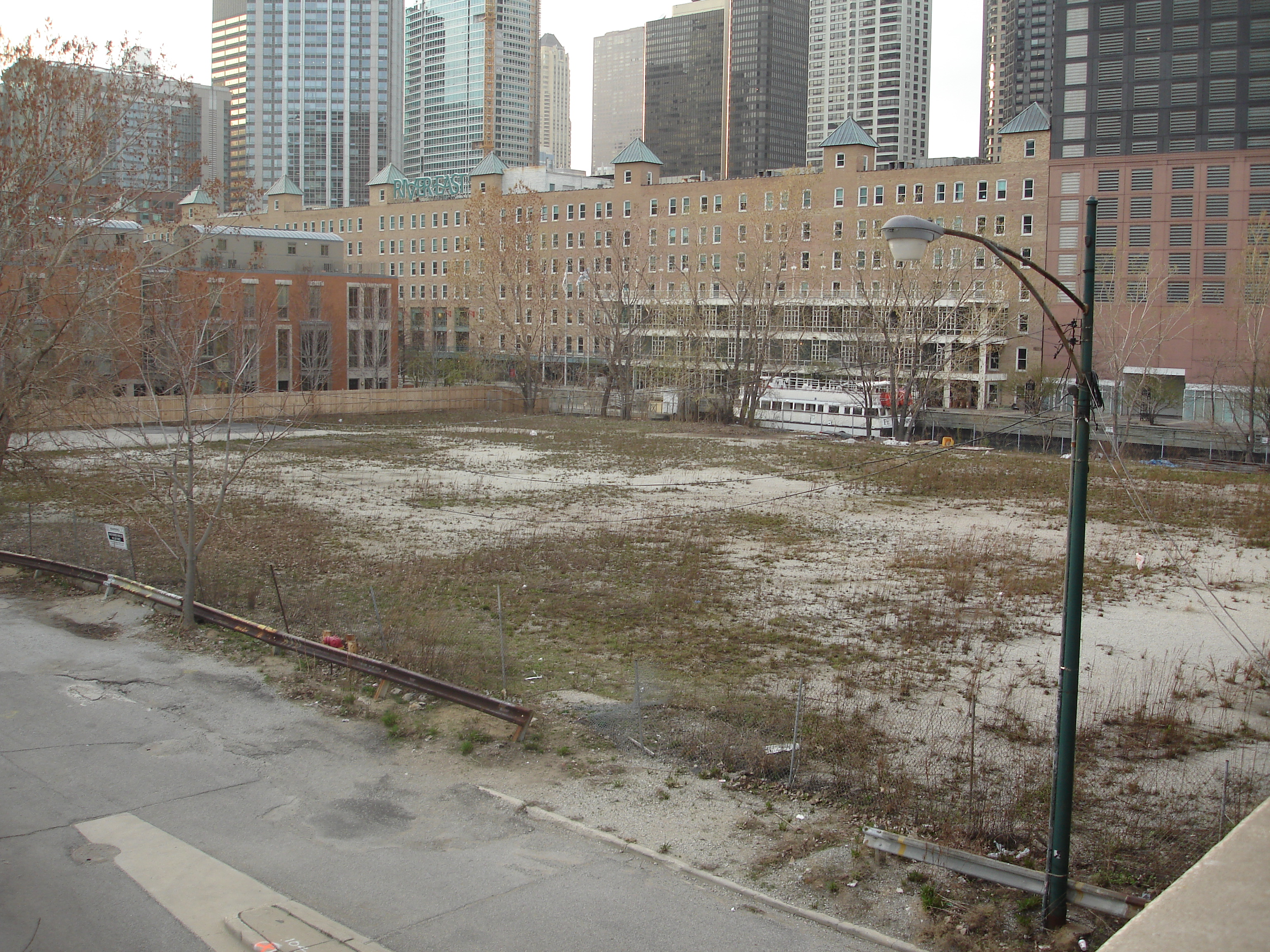
Months before construction on April 13, 2006

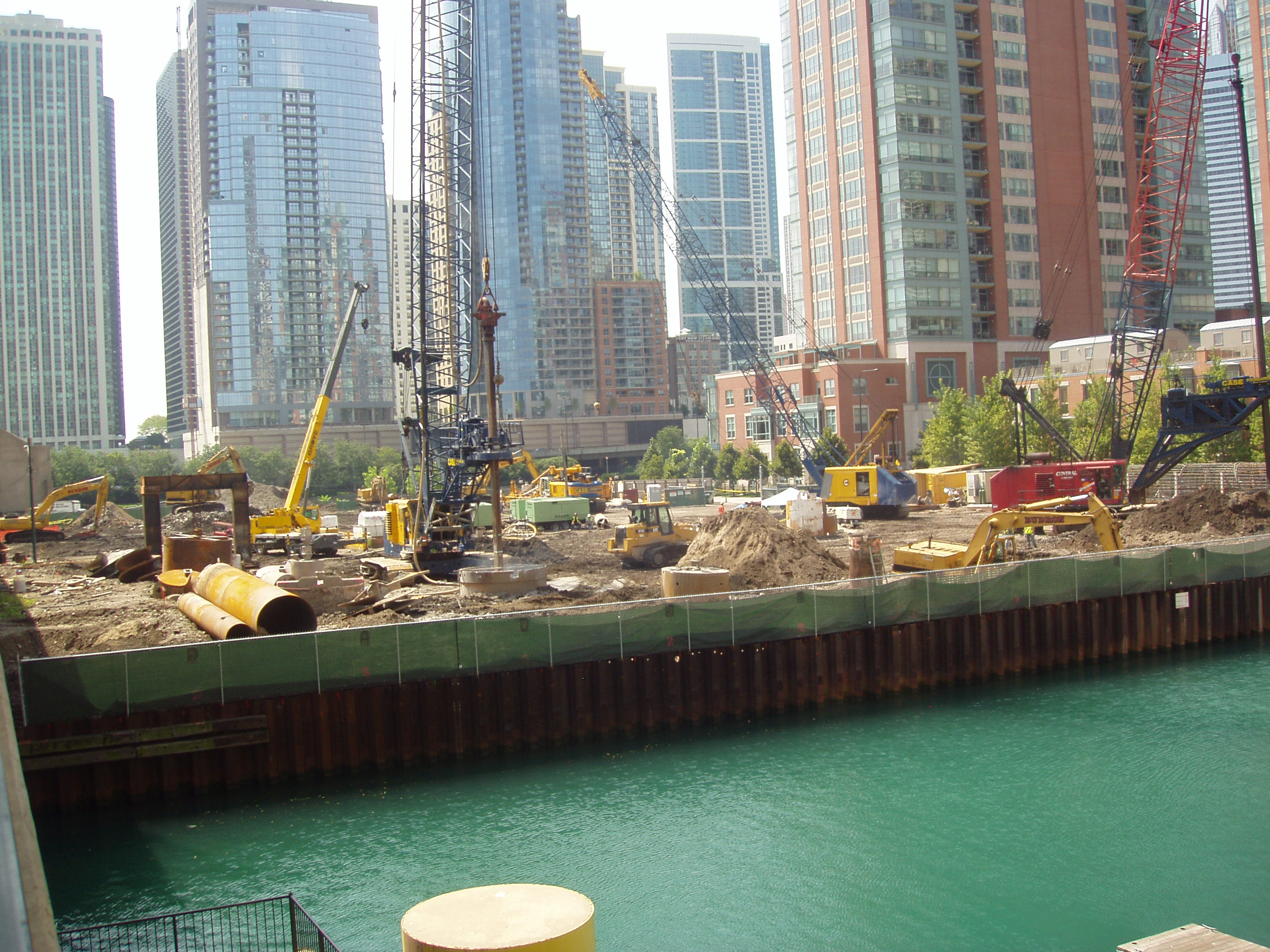
Bedrock being drilled on August 22, 2007

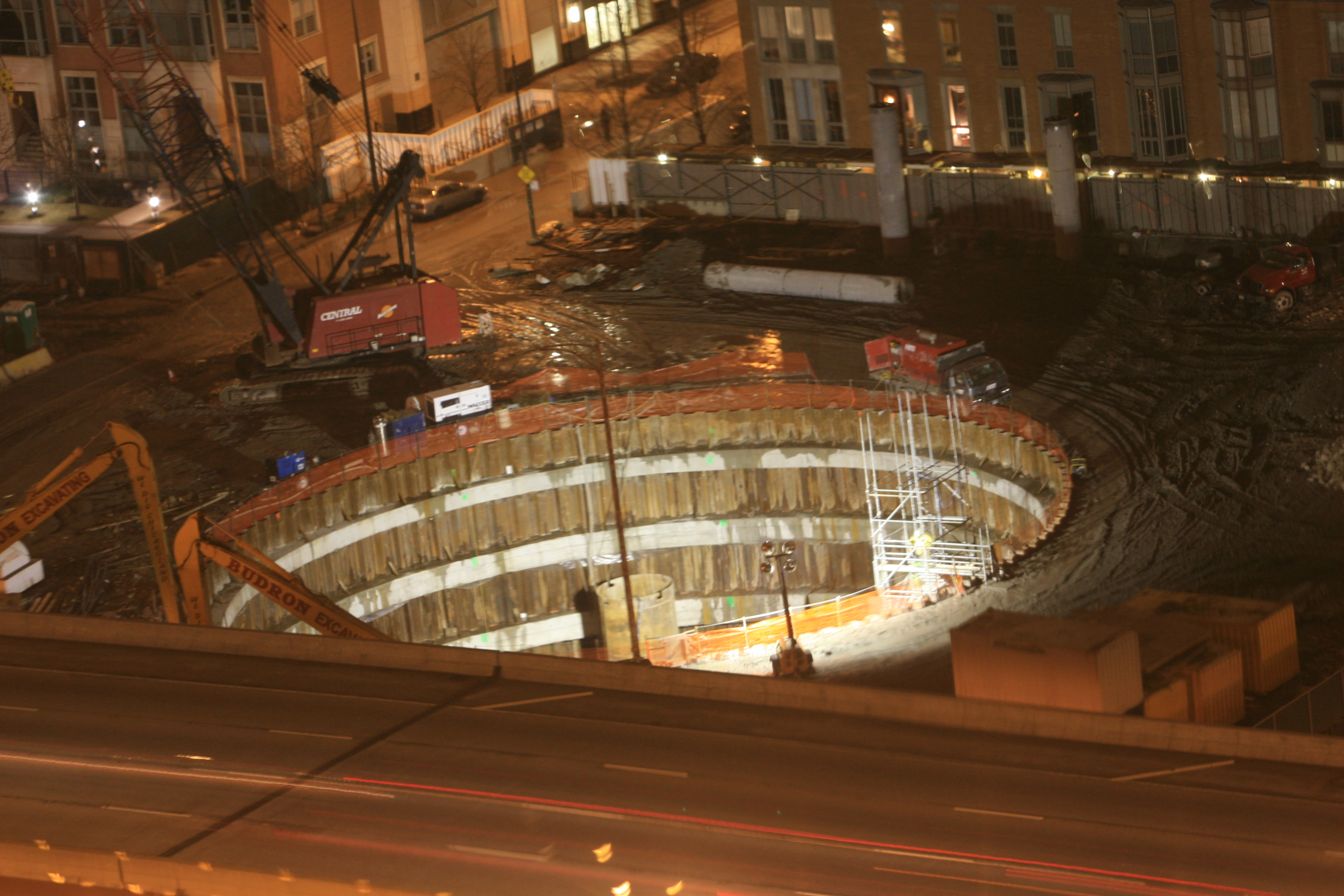
Closeup of base excavation January 12, 2008

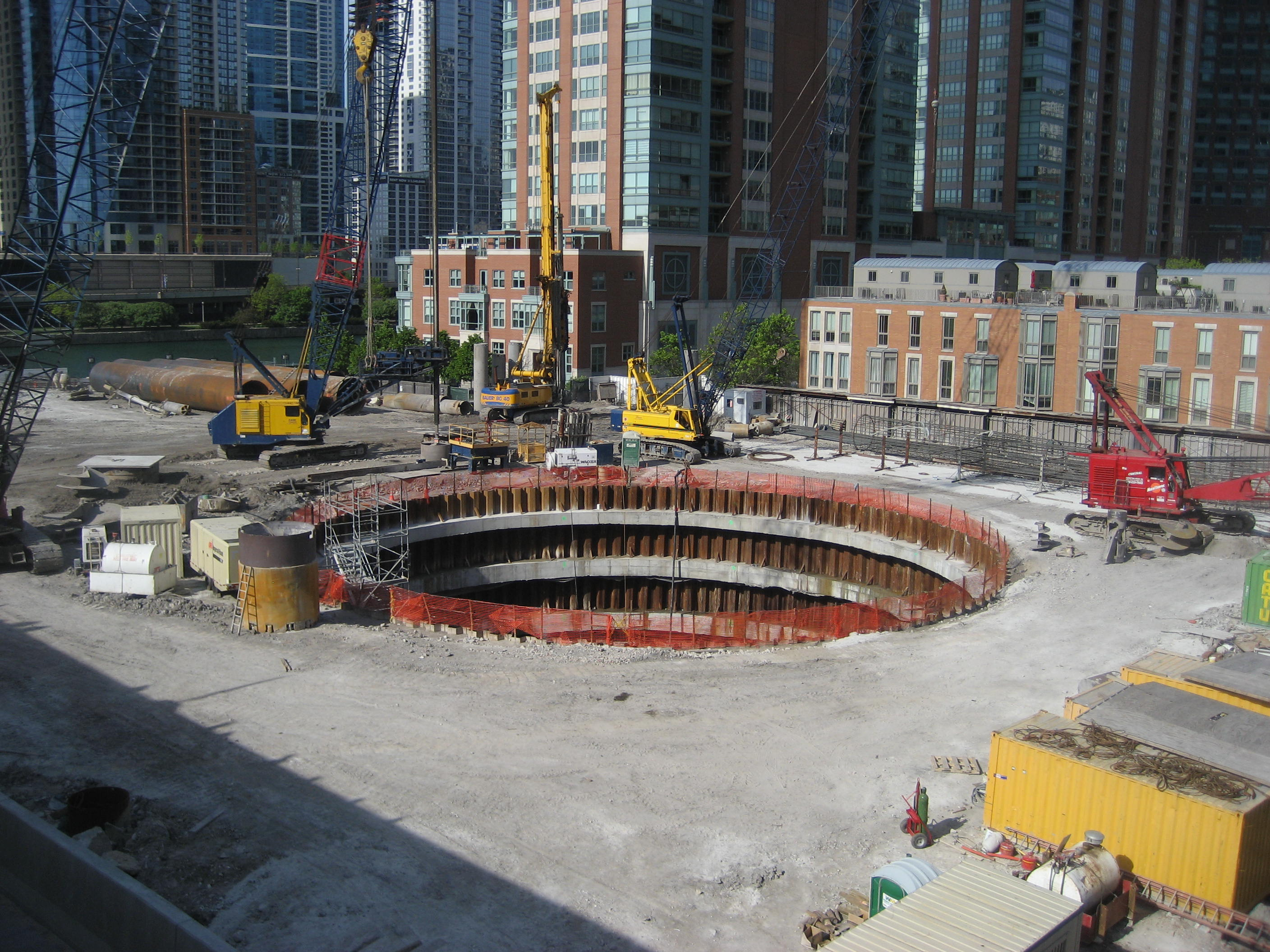
May 25, 2008

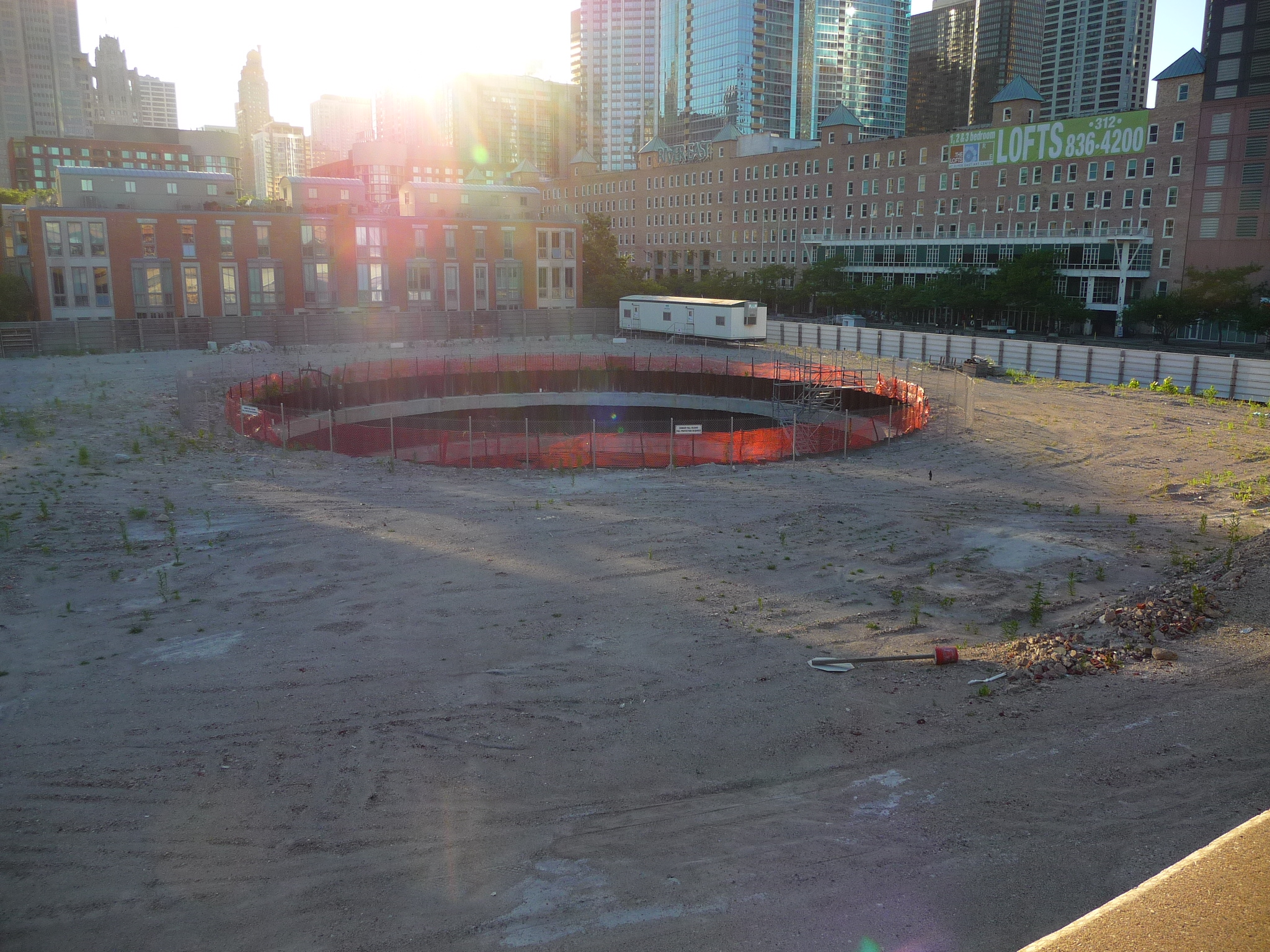
The site as of July 2, 2010

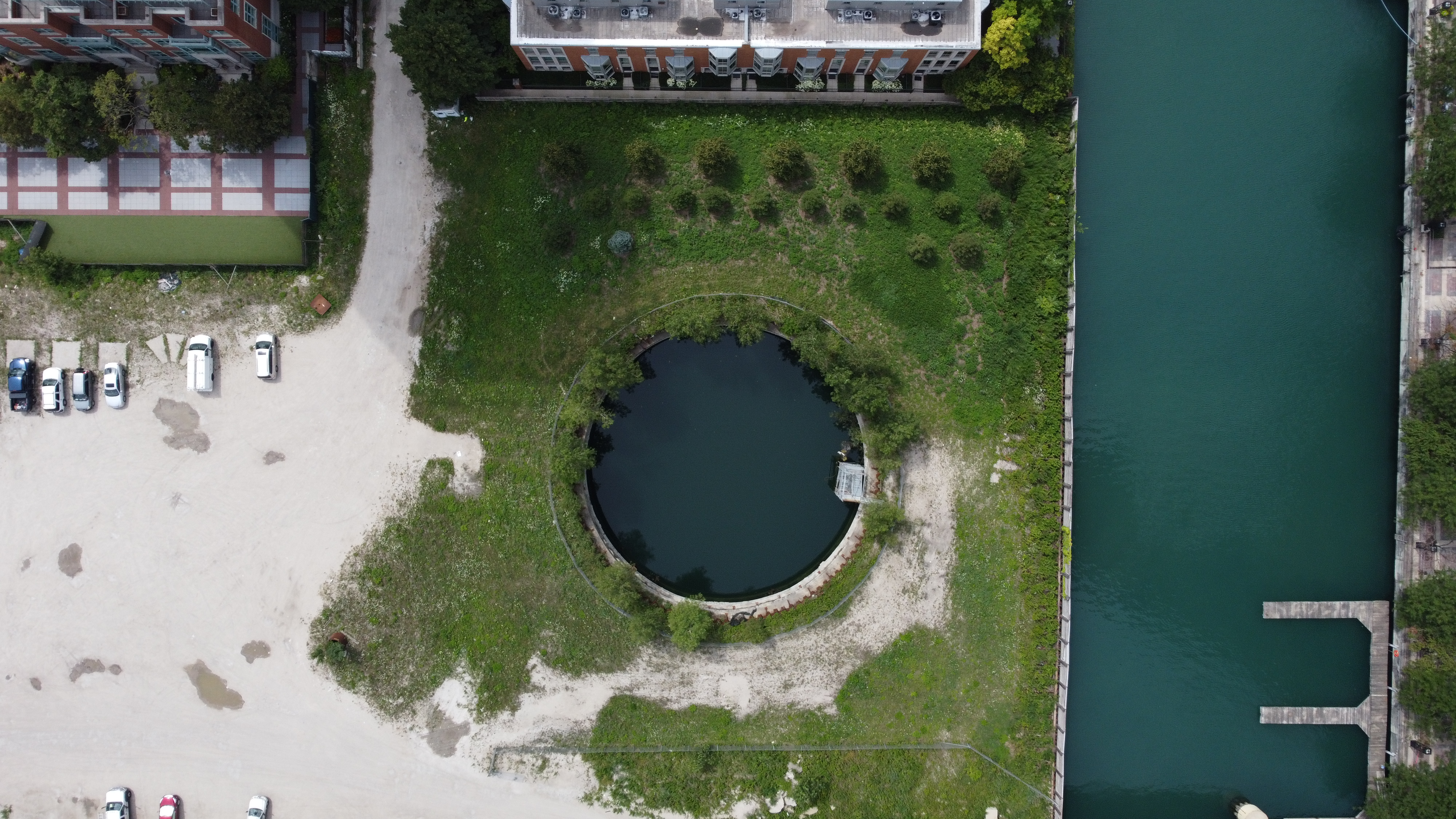
The Chicago Spire Hole as of July 30, 2021

== See also ==
- List of skyscrapers
- List of tallest buildings in Chicago
- List of tallest buildings in the United States
- List of buildings with 100 floors or more
- World's tallest structures
