= North Pier (disambiguation) =

North Pier is a pier in Blackpool, England.

North Pier may also refer to:

- North Pier (Chicago)

== See also ==
- North Pier Apartments, a skyscraper in Chicago
- North Pier Light (disambiguation)
