= Oak Street Beach =

Beach in Chicago, Illinois, U.S.

- Beach
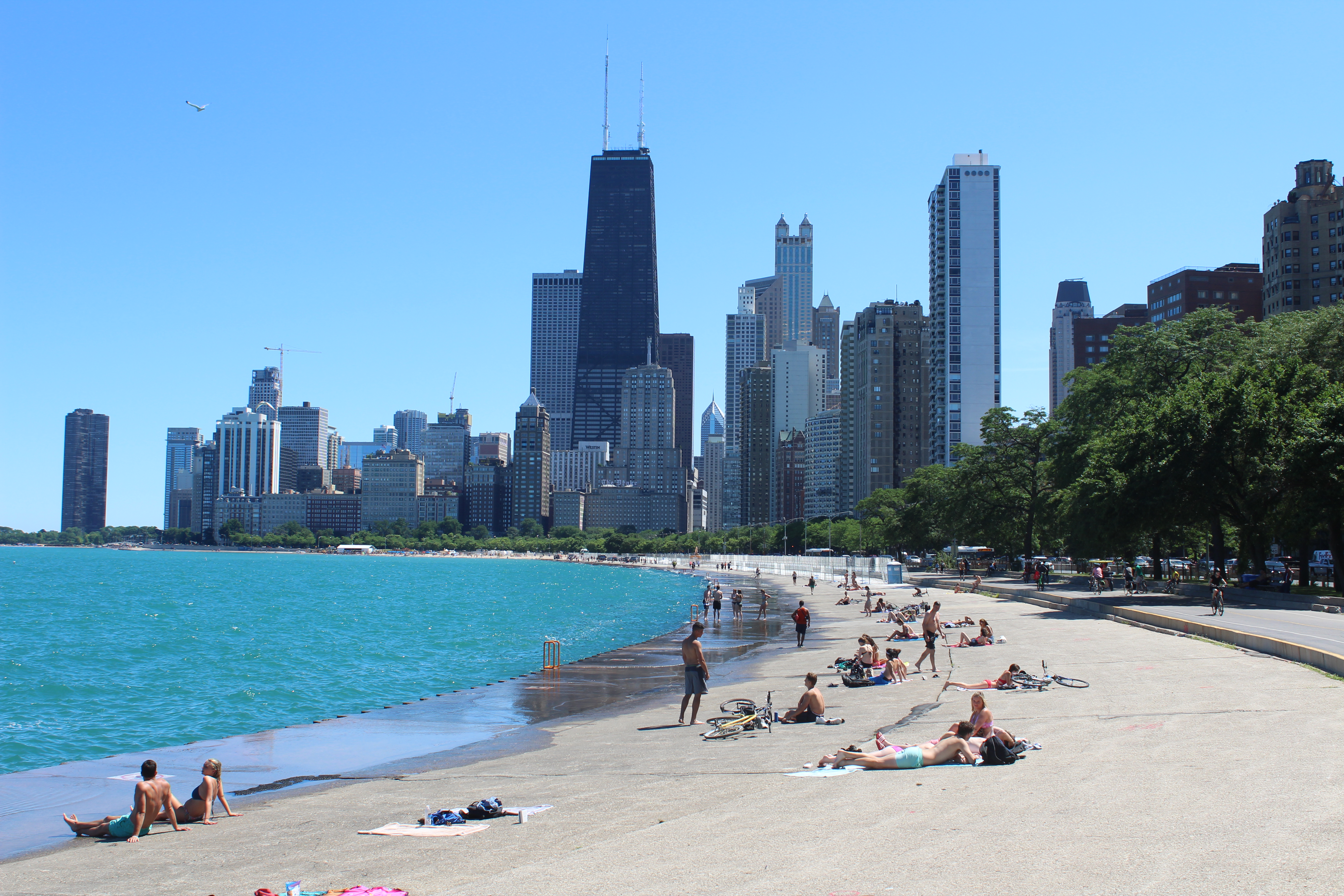
- The beach in July 2018, looking south

- Location within Chicago metropolitan area
- Coordinates: 41.903°N 87.623°W
- Location: Chicago, Illinois, U.S.

Oak Street Beach is a recreation area on the shore of Lake Michigan located at the intersection of Oak Street and Lake Shore Drive in Chicago, Illinois.

== History ==
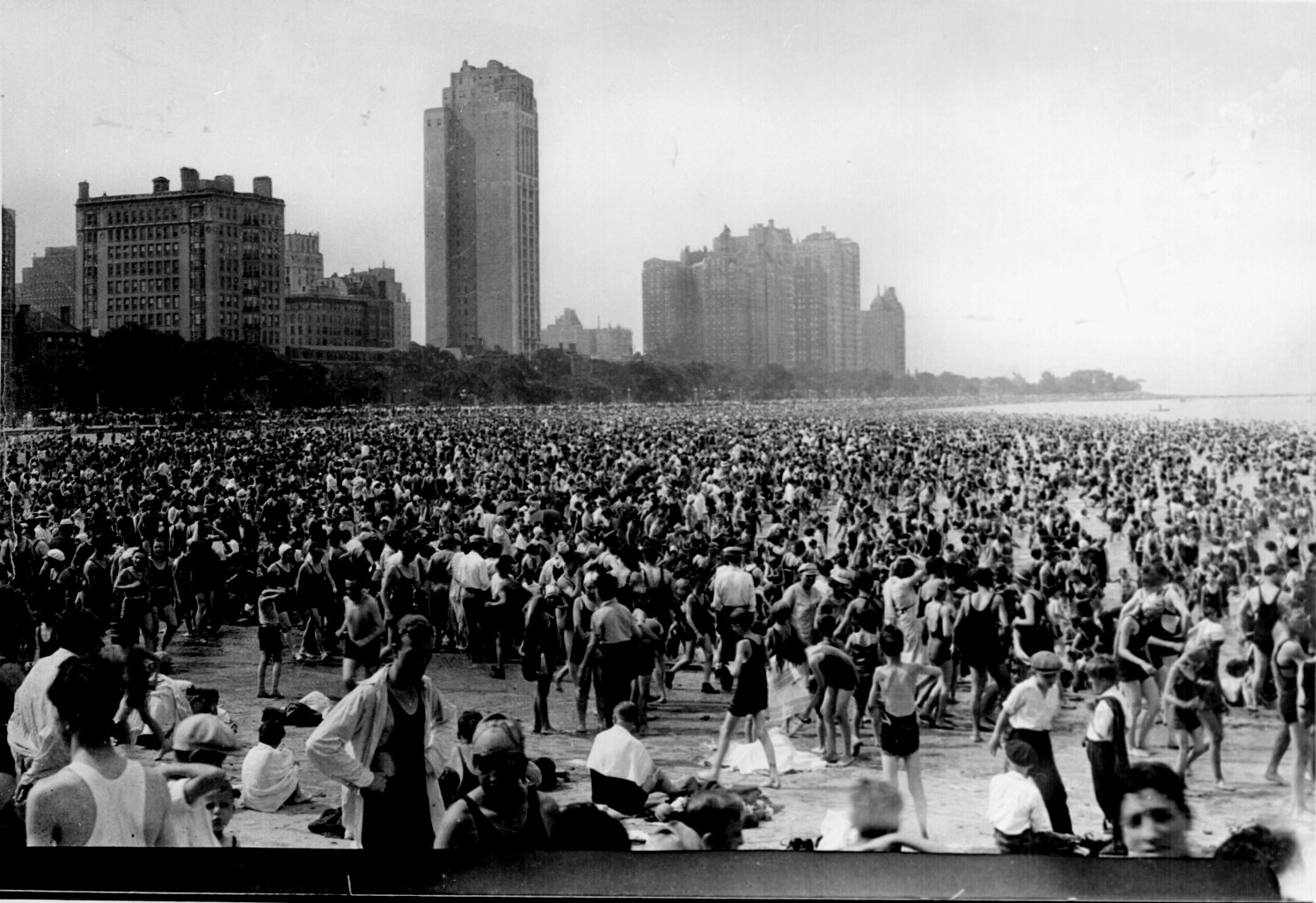
Oak Street Beach in 1925

Up until the late 1800s the Lake Shore sloped from Oak Street to the Chicago River in a much gentler fashion. However the construction of a shipping pier at the river led to a build up of sand and silt just to the north. As the land rose up out of the water squatters began to take residence, leading to disputes with lakefront property owners.

The biggest series of clashes surrounded a man named George Streeter in 1886. Streeter's boat, with passengers and cargo, became stranded on the sandbar created by the pier. As he unloaded waste and cargo, he created a small island. Eventually he persuaded people to dump more there, and claimed a sizable island. However the city would not stand for it, and after legal battles (some of which included gun fights) Streeter was evicted and the land, which was eventually filled in, became part of Chicago and became known as Streeterville.

Oak Street Beach was formed by sand washing up against the northern side of Streeterville. Originally, it was under control of the Lincoln Park District, one of several districts in the city that were consolidated in 1934 to create the Chicago Park District.

== Cultural impact ==
A radio advertisement for mattresses, in the 1970s, featured a child reading a letter he was writing to the Sandman. The punch line was the child asking, "Is it true you get all your sand from Oak Street Beach?"

Chicago pop-punk band Knuckle Puck released a song titled "Oak Street" on their "While I Stay Secluded" EP.

Chicago hip-hop artist Chance The Rapper mentions Oak Street Beach in the third verse of his song, Windows.

== Gallery ==
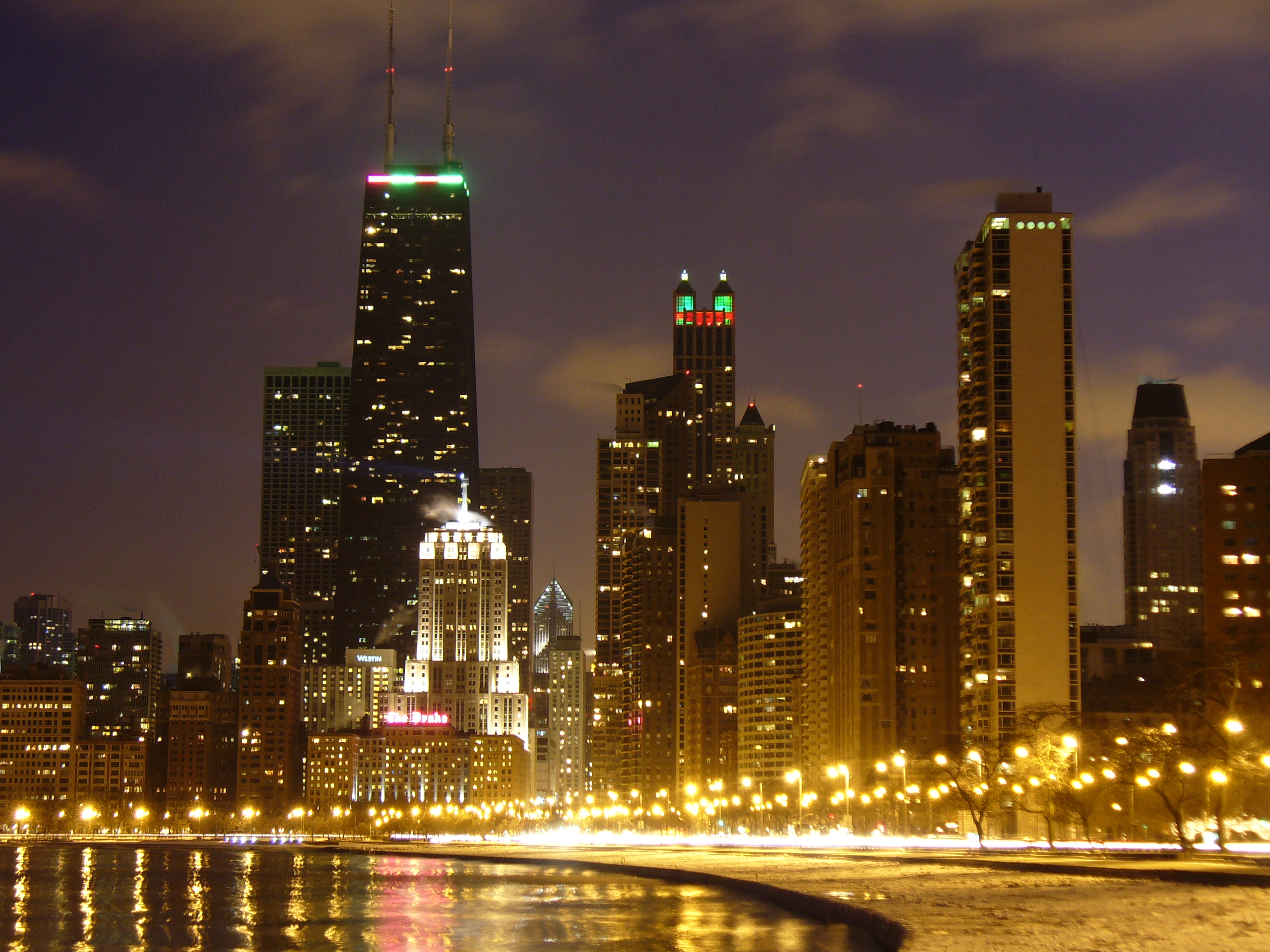
Oak Street beach at night, 2010

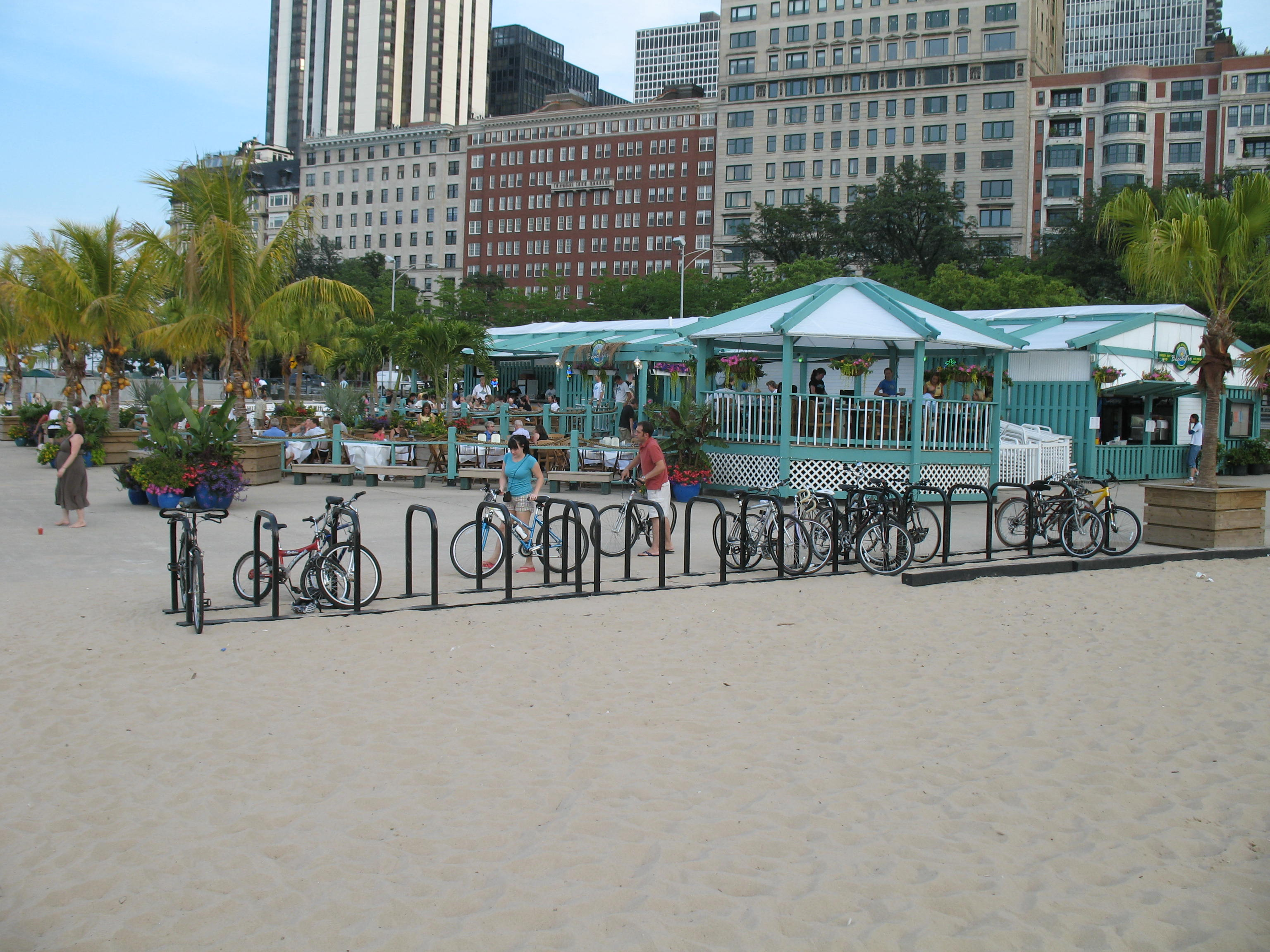
The beach's 'Oak Street Beachstro'

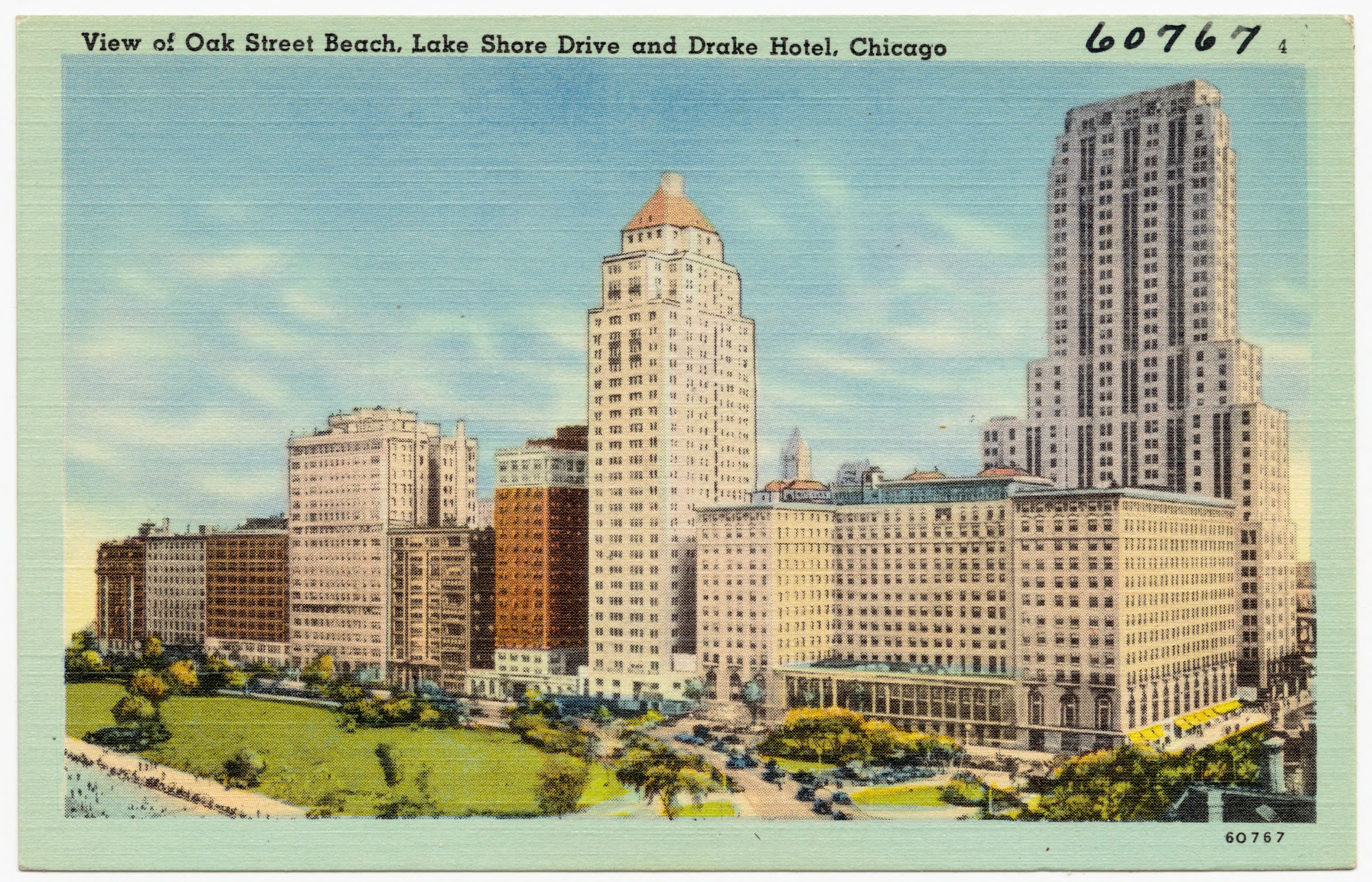
Postcard view c.1940s

== See also ==
- Beaches in Chicago
- Lincoln Park
