= East Lake Shore Drive District =

Historic district in Chicago, Illinois, United States

Coordinates: 41.9007°N 87.6219°W

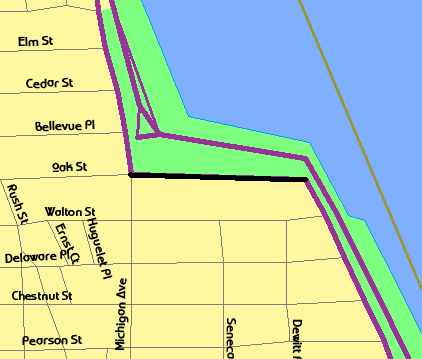

The East Lake Shore Drive District is a historic district in the Near North Side community area of Chicago, Illinois. It includes eight buildings at 140 E. Walton, 179-229 E. Lake Shore Drive, and 999 N. Lake Shore Drive, including buildings designed by Marshall and Fox and Fugard & Knapp.

The East Lake Shore Drive District was designated a Chicago Landmark district on April 18, 1985. A historical marker denoting the landmark district is found in front of 199 E. Lake Shore Dr. This district is located within the Streeterville neighborhood and overlaps with the Gold Coast.

The district includes seven luxury high rise apartment buildings and the Drake Hotel and includes two buildings (the Drake, which is at 140 E. Walton Pl., and 999 N. Lake Shore Dr.) that do not have East Lake Shore Drive addresses.

As of 2014, East Lake Shore Drive ranked as the 6th wealthiest neighborhood in America with a median household income of $593,454.

== Photos ==
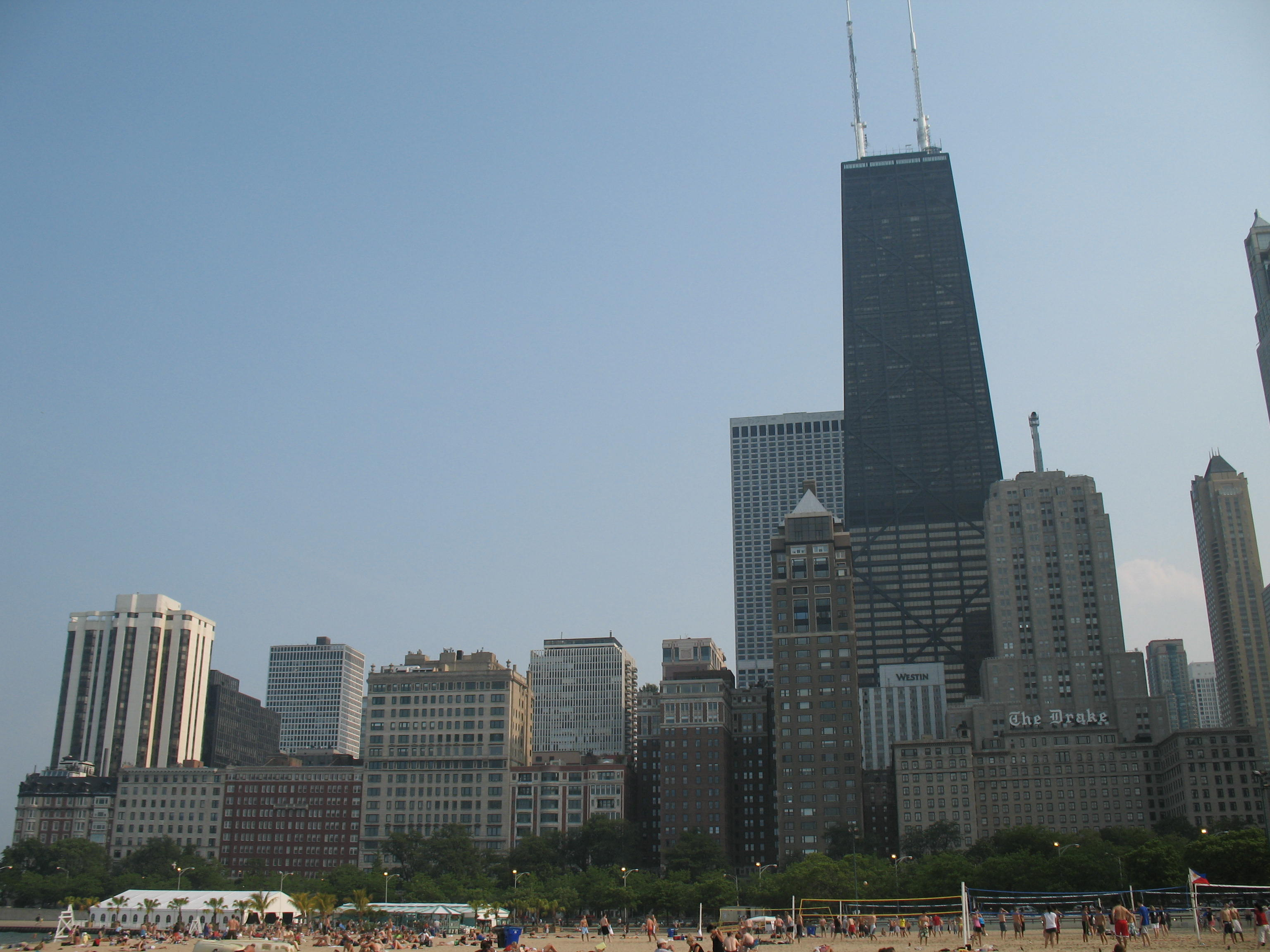
Historic District from Oak Street Beach

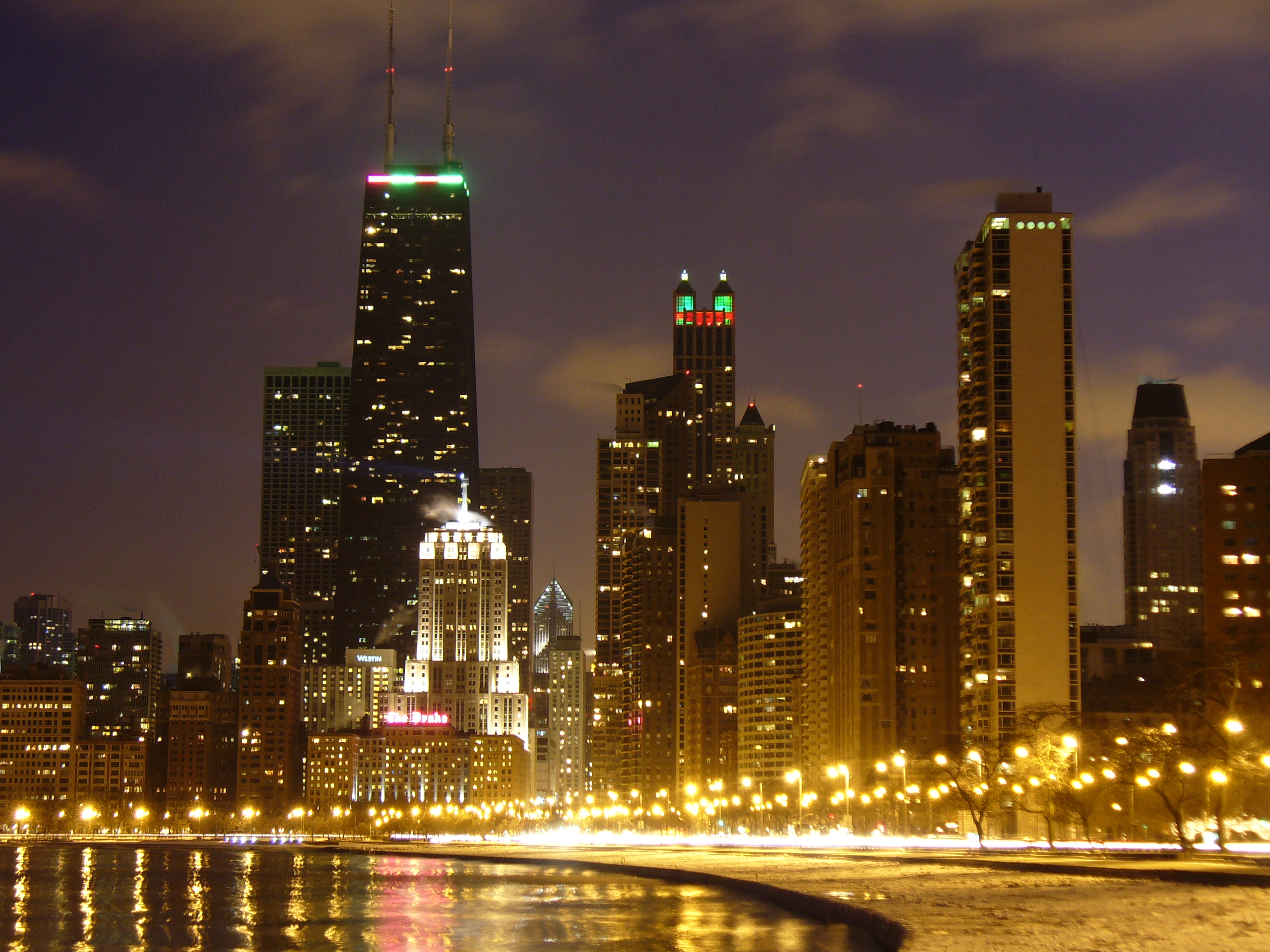
Night on the Gold Coast (including East Lake Shore Drive District to left)

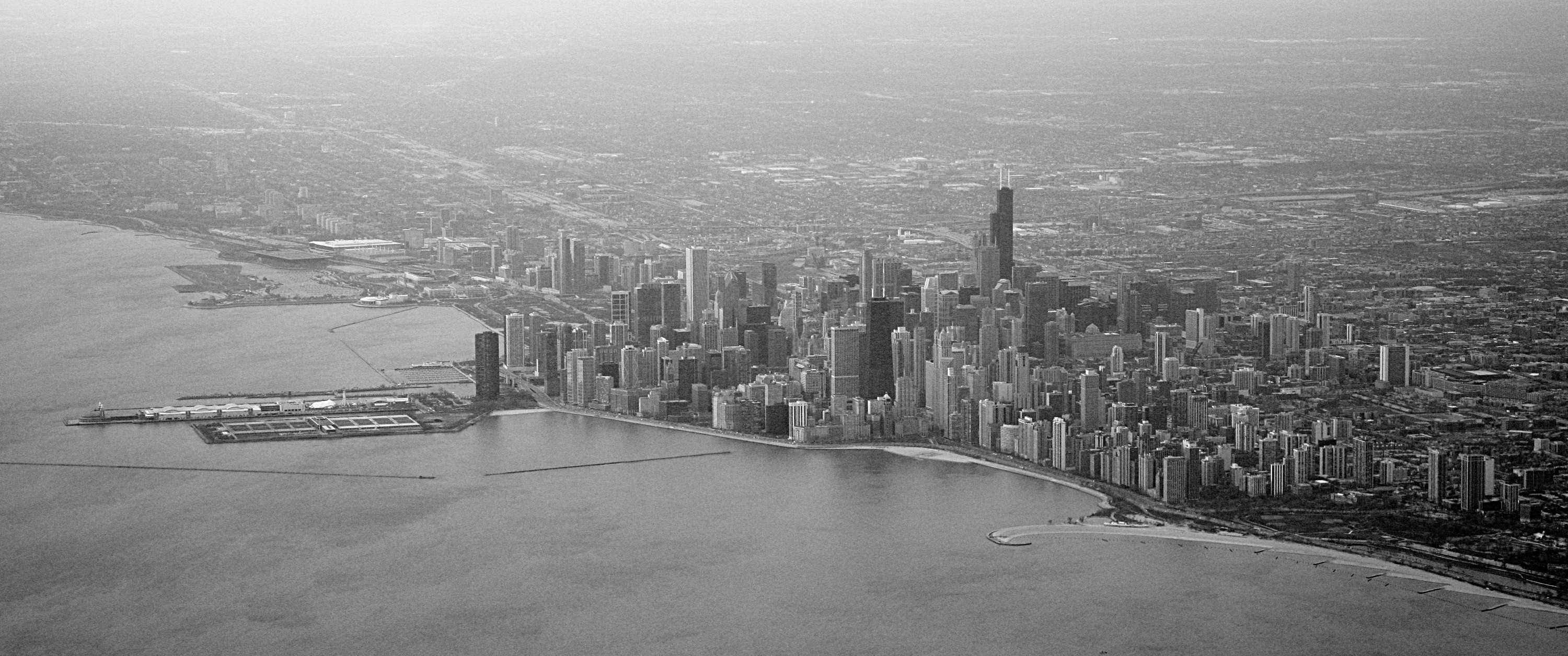
The East Lake Shore Drive Historic District is a prominent part of the skyline
