= North Pier (Chicago) =

Building in Chicago

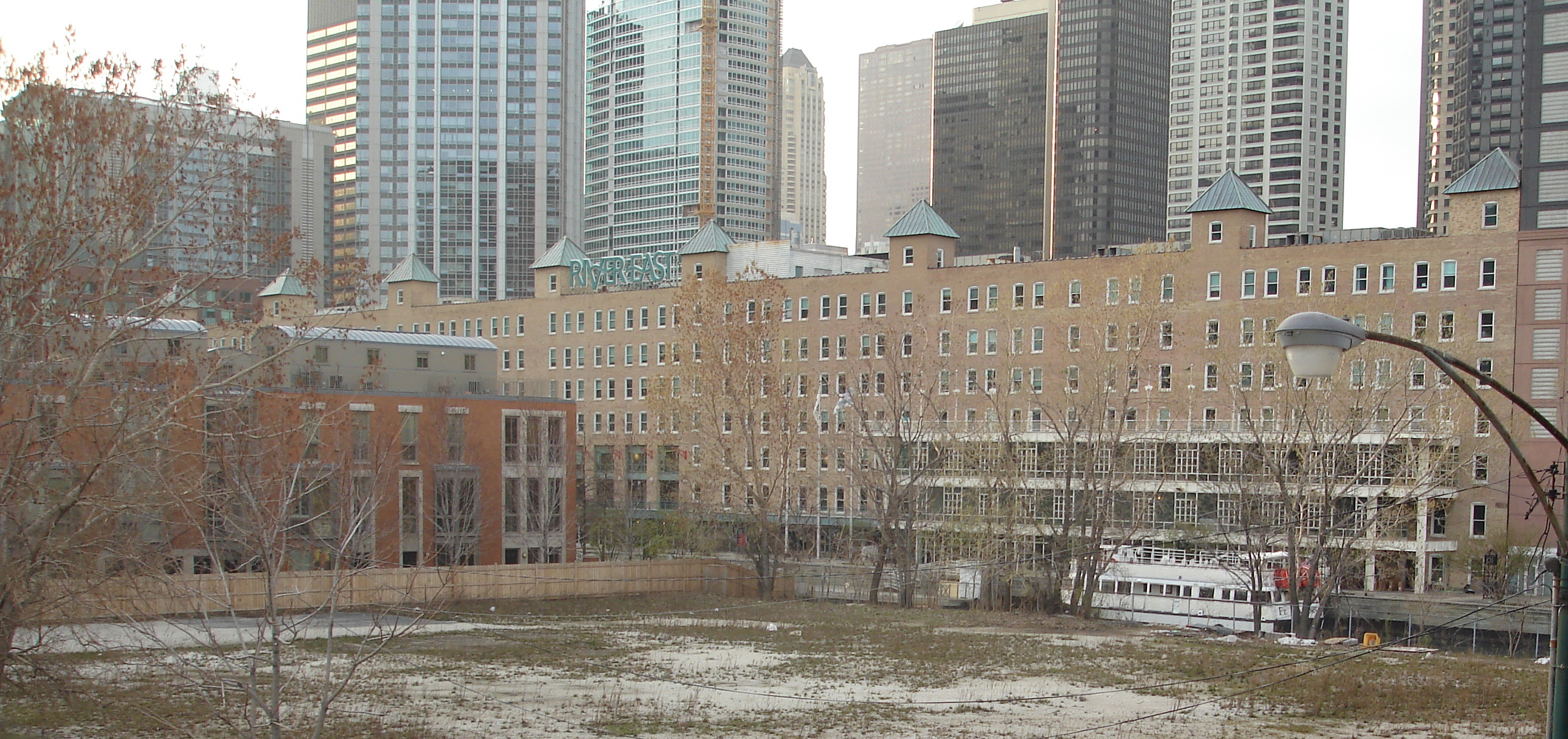
- Location: Chicago, Illinois, United States
- Coordinates: 41°53′26.8″N 87°36′58.7″W
- Address: 435 E. Illinois St., Chicago, IL 60611
- Opened: 1990
- Closed: 2013 (indoor mall, anchor still open)
- Developer: Broadacre Management
- Architect: Christian Eckstorm (Pugh Terminal), Booth Hansen (North Pier), FitzGerald Associates Architects (Lofts at River East)
- Floor area: 200,000 sq ft (18,581 m^{2})
- Floors: 3

North Pier was a retail and office complex located in the Streeterville neighborhood of Chicago, Illinois. The timber loft building, which lines the north side of Ogden Slip, was originally named Pugh Terminal and used as a wholesale exhibition center predating the Merchandise Mart.

It was redeveloped into commercial uses as part of Cityfront Center, a 1985 master plan for 50 acres of what were industrial and port facilities in south Streeterville. The renovation was proposed in 1987 by Robert Meers, who envisioned it was "not a festival market, but a specialized retailing center," complementary to Navy Pier or the Magnificent Mile, a few blocks east or west. Other developers proposed apartments within the building instead.

When completed in 1989, North Pier featured three levels of retailers on the lower levels, centered on a rotunda, and four floors of offices above. Waterfront restaurants lined Ogden Slip south of the building on the building's lowest level, while the primary entrance from Illinois Street led up a few stairs to the second level of the mall. The adjacent North Pier Apartments tower was also completed in 1990.

The mall was home to the first Battletech Center.

Occupancy was never strong: the mall lacked strong anchor tenants, the adapted industrial facade along Illinois Street lacked clear entrances and views inside, and the half-built-out surroundings dissuaded foot traffic. "The property never lived up to expectations," as a local business newspaper wrote, even after it was renamed River East Plaza in 1997 and marketed to artists and art galleries. In 2013, it was purchased out of bankruptcy court by a developer who subsequently converted the building into the Lofts at River East apartments and closed the interior mall.

Two floors of exterior-facing retail remain: an upper level facing Illinois Street and a lower level facing Ogden Slip. As of 2015, anchor tenants include a Target Express and a Pinstripes bowling alley.
