= Streeterville =

Neighborhood in Chicago

Coordinates: 41.893828°N 87.619743°W

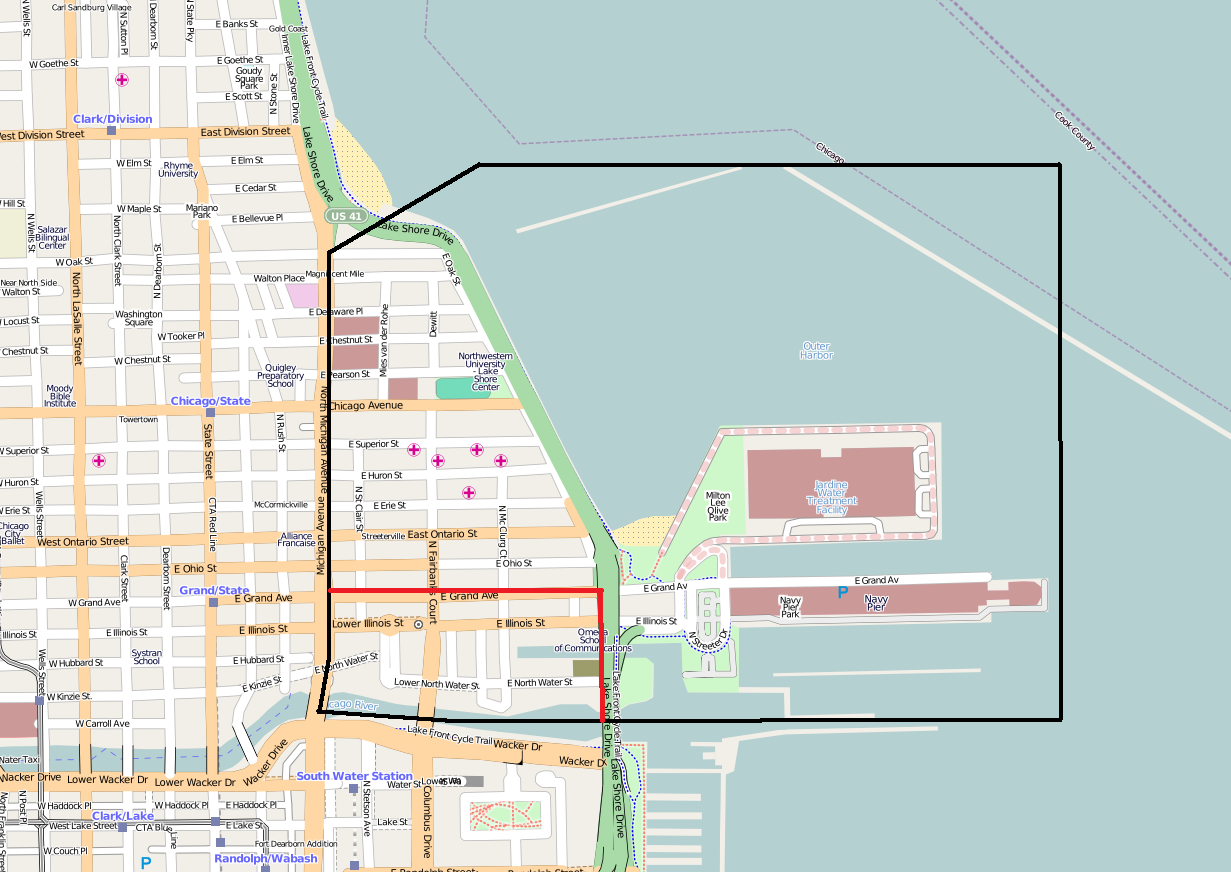
Most sources support Streeterville borders as shown in black, but the City of Chicago officially only includes the smaller region in red

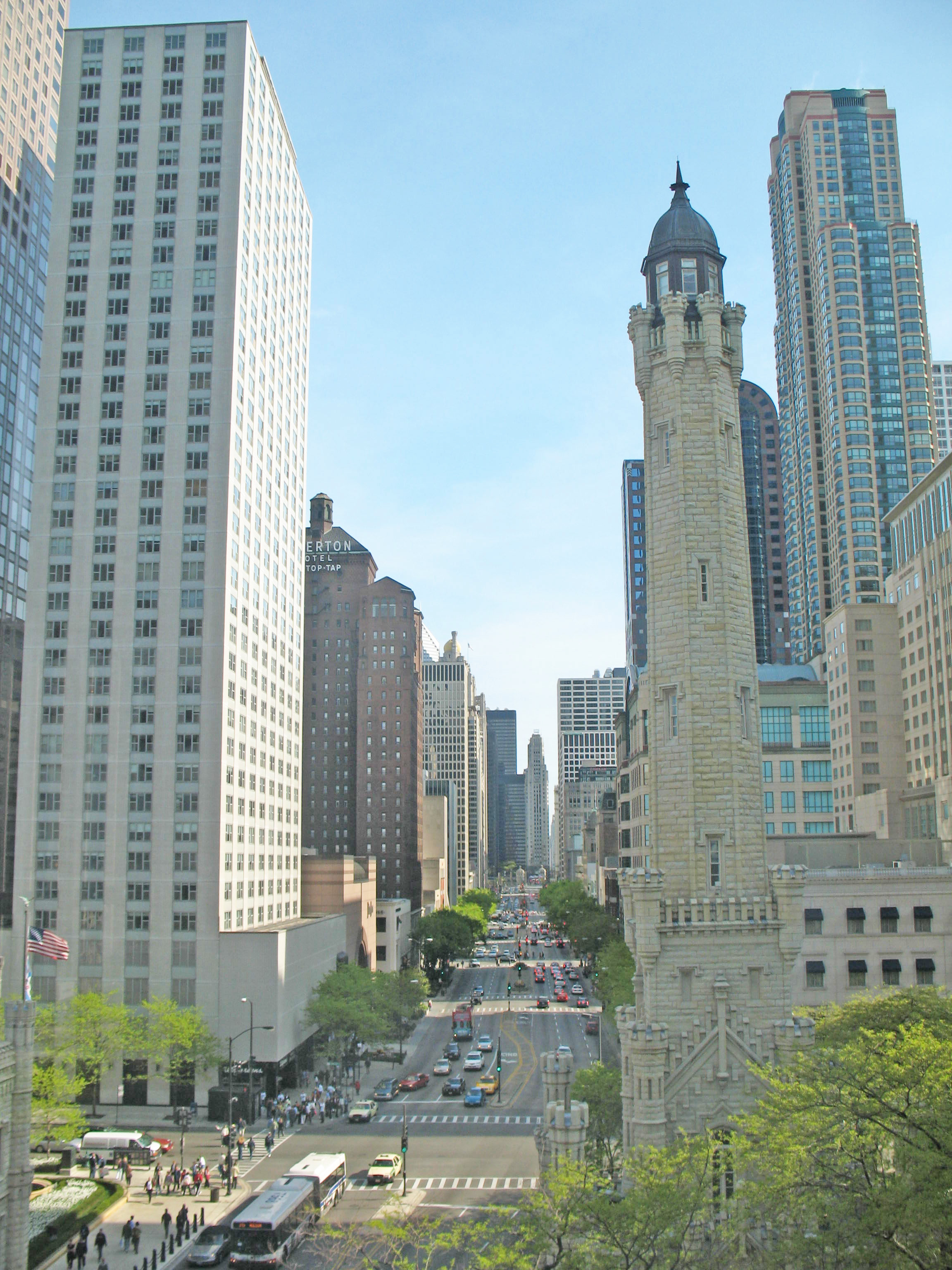
The Magnificent Mile is generally considered the western boundary

Streeterville is a neighborhood in the Near North Side community area of Chicago, Illinois, United States. Located north of the Chicago River, it is bounded by the river on the south, the Magnificent Mile portion of Michigan Avenue on the west, and Lake Michigan on the north and east. The tourist attraction of Navy Pier and Ohio Street Beach extend out into the lake from southern Streeterville. To the north, the East Lake Shore Drive District, where the Drive curves around the shoreline, may be considered an extension of the Gold Coast. The majority of the land in this neighborhood is reclaimed sandbar.

Named for George Streeter, the neighborhood contains a combination of hotels, restaurants, professional office centers, residential high rises, universities, medical facilities, and cultural venues. The area has undergone increased development in the early 21st century as numerous empty lots in Streeterville have been converted into commercial and residential properties, especially in the southern part of the neighborhood. The neighborhood had earlier experienced booms following World War I and World War II.

== History ==
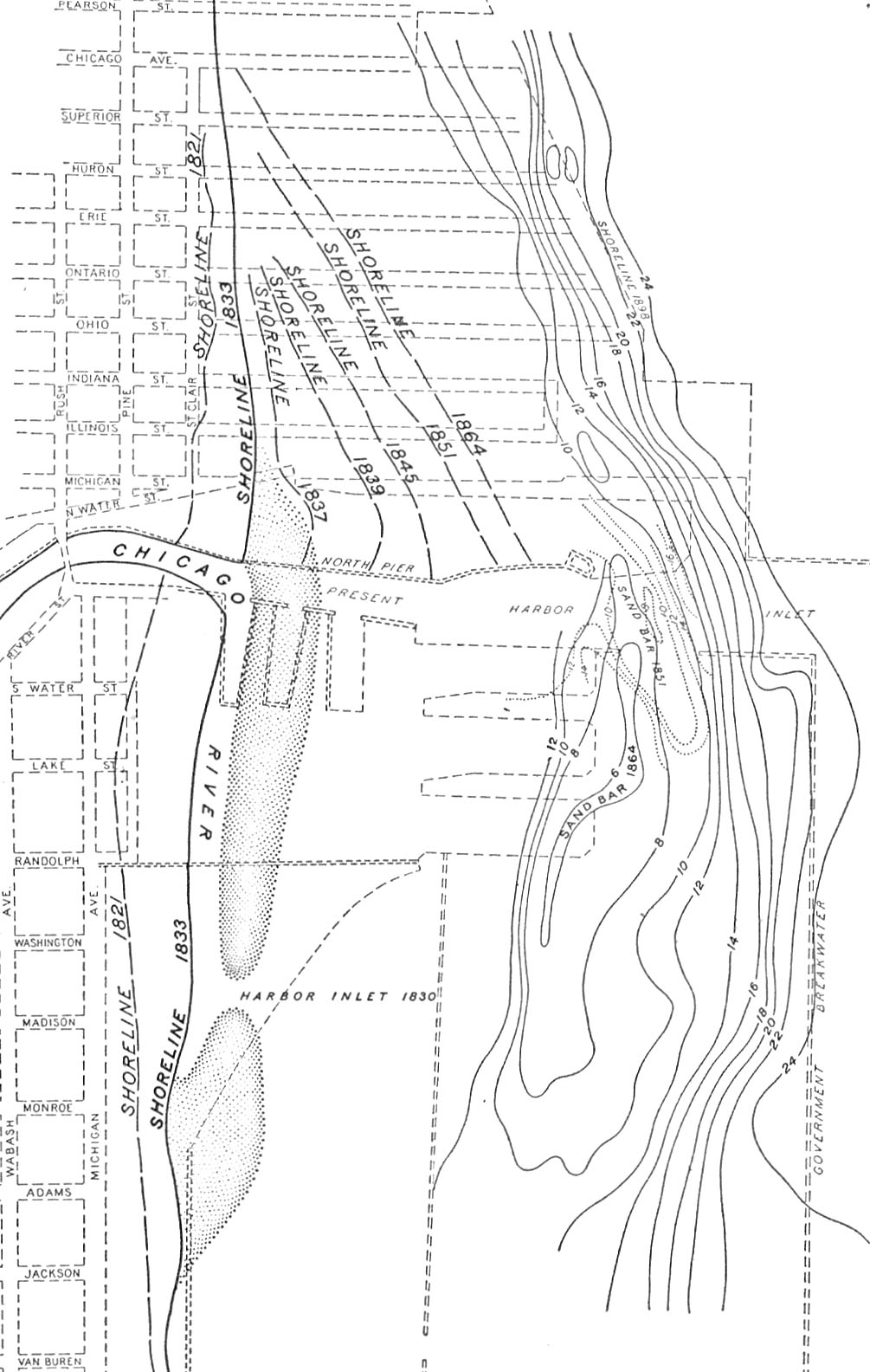
Map of the shoreline of Lake Michigan at the mouth of the Chicago River at intervals from 1821 to 1902

Before the American settlement of the Chicago area, the lake shoreline fluctuated from year to year as storm waves eroded parts of the shore and built up the shore elsewhere. By 1803, when American troops started the construction of Fort Dearborn, a baymouth bar blocked the mouth of the river causing it to jog southwards and enter Lake Michigan at about the level of present-day Madison Street. When surveyed in 1821 the Lake Michigan shoreline north of the river ran approximately along what is now North Saint Clair Street, just to the east of what is now Michigan Avenue. In 1834, after a number of failed attempts to cut through the sandbar at the mouth of the river, a 1,500-foot (457.2 m) pier was built to protect a channel cut through the bar. Silt and sand accumulated north of this pier, creating usable land that was later nicknamed "The Sands". Squatters and a vice district encroached on the district, causing angst among the property owners. In 1857, Chicago Mayor John Wentworth evicted these trespassers from the land.

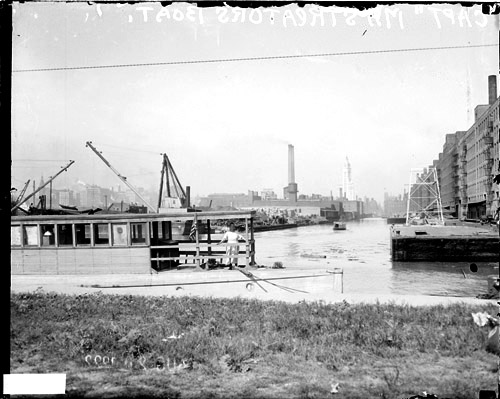
Houseboat of Mrs. George Wellington Streeter docked on Lake Michigan (1922)

In the late 1880s, George Streeter claimed that his newly acquired boat struck a sandbar just off the Chicago shoreline during a storm. Landfill dumped in an effort to create land on which to build Lake Shore Drive by the Lincoln Park Board created 186 acres (0.75 km^{2}) of new land along the lake front, which Streeter attempted to claim. Streeter claimed that this newly created land was his and that it was an independent territory which he called the District of Lake Michigan.

For the next few decades, Streeter persisted in his claims, sometimes supporting them through criminal means. A witness in Streeter's 1902 land fraud trial testified that Streeter had purposely set out to contest the claims of the wealthy shoreline owners. Contractor Hank Brusser told the court that Streeter asked him to fill in portions of the shoreline in order to create confusion over land titles. According to Brusser, Streeter said that: "They [the owners of the shoreline] will have to buy us off" and that "We'll get a million out of it". Streeter was also motivated by the profit he gained by selling and taxing the land he claimed.

The local press became enamored with the story of Streeter's brash personality and his self-proclaimed district. Mayor William Hale Thompson tried to evict the Streeters for selling liquor, and after several eviction attempts and gun battles, Streeter landed in jail. In 1918, the courts ruled against his claim of sovereignty. Today, the district is home to some of the most expensive real estate in Chicago.

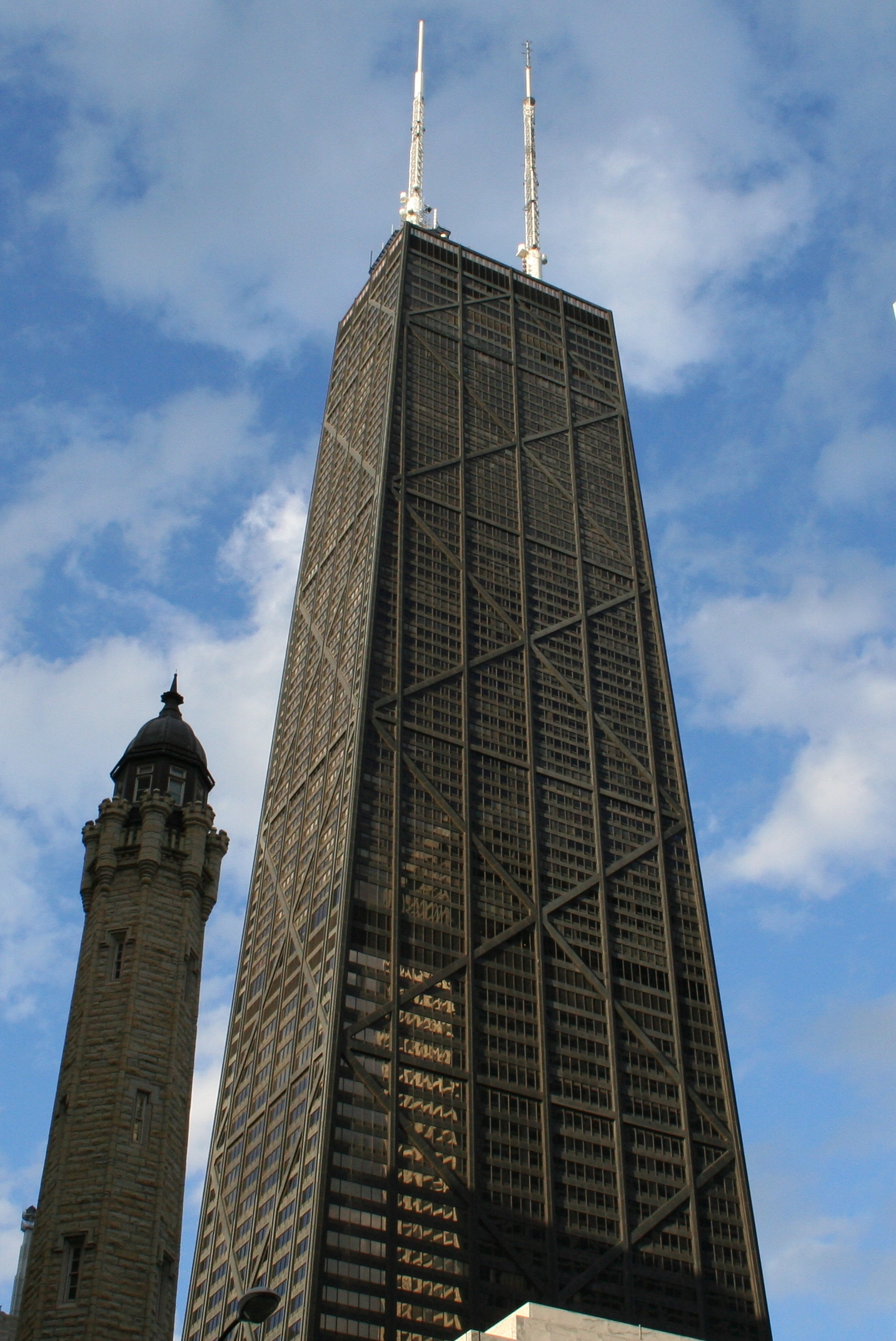
The John Hancock Center and the Chicago Water Tower are two notable Streeterville buildings.

The 1920 opening of the Michigan Avenue Bridge, which was part of the efforts to enact the Burnham Plan of 1909, as well as the economic boom of the 1920s, brought wealth to the eastern sector of the Near North Side and paved the way for a luxury shopping district on North Michigan Avenue. Investors built high-rise apartment buildings such as those in the East Lake Shore Drive Historic District, and elaborate hotels. The Bridge connected to a North Michigan avenue that served as a replacement for the former Pine Street which hosted warehouses and factory buildings near the river, and large mansions and rowhouses in northward sections in the neighborhoods of McCormickville and Streeterville. Magnificent Mile architecture during the economic boom of the 1920s emphasized historicist architectural styles such as Beaux-Arts classicism, Gothic revival, and vertical-style modernism. The buildings redefined the Chicago skyline with stylistic variation that gave new meaning to urban context and design compatibility.

A post-World War II construction surge occurred in the area, and in the 1950s the city pursued a plan of urban renewal. A local real estate developer named Arthur Rubloff led the revitalization of North Michigan Avenue under the banner of “The Magnificent Mile”. The success of this effort spurred the erection of more high-rise apartments and new investment in the Near North Side. This development led to the "canyonization" of Michigan Avenue, where the buildings on both sides of the street tower above, creating an "urban canyon".

== Today ==
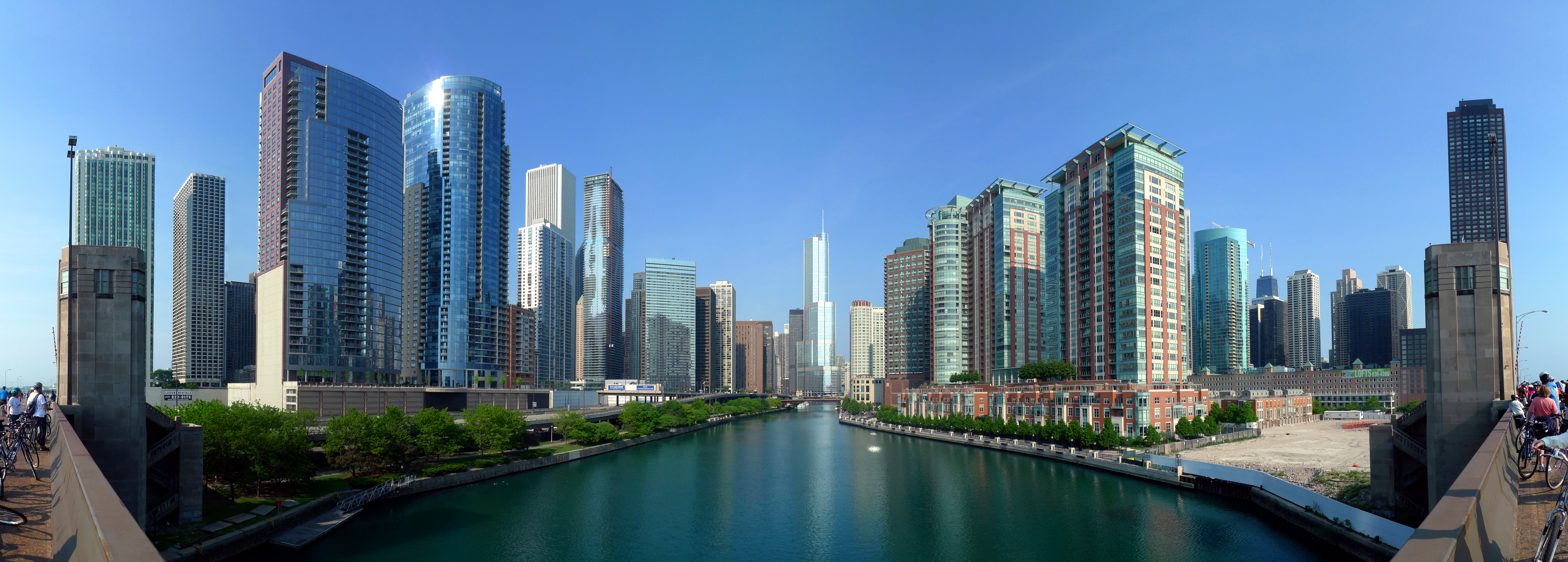
Chicago River is the south border (right) of the Near North Side and Streeterville and the north border (left) of Chicago Loop, Lakeshore East and Illinois Center (from Lake Shore Drive's Link Bridge with Marina Towers at jog in the river in the center)

While Streeterville is generally bounded on the west by the Magnificent Mile, the city of Chicago and the Streeterville Organization of Active Residents, claim the boundary extends one block further to the west to Rush Street. Streeterville includes some of Chicago's tallest skyscrapers, such as the John Hancock Center, and upscale stores, hotels, and restaurants.

Although its main campus is in Evanston, Illinois, Northwestern University has its Chicago campus here. The Northwestern University Feinberg School of Medicine is on the Chicago campus and is adjacent to several closely affiliated hospitals, including Northwestern Memorial Hospital, the Ann & Robert H. Lurie Children's Hospital of Chicago, the Prentice Women's Hospital, and the Rehabilitation Institute of Chicago. The Prentice Women's Hospital opened in October 2007, and the Ann & Robert H. Lurie Children's Hospital of Chicago opened in June 2012. The Rehabilitation Institute of Chicago is located in Streeterville and construction of a replacement facility, also in Streeterville, was begun in 2013. The Northwestern University School of Professional Studies and part of its Kellogg School of Management are nearby. The Northwestern University Pritzker School of Law is at Chicago Avenue and Lake Shore Drive, adjacent to Lake Shore Park and Lake Michigan. In the western end of the park is the Museum of Contemporary Art, Chicago. The downtown campus of the University of Chicago Booth School of Business has a Chicago River setting to the south. The east side of the Magnificent Mile portion of Michigan Avenue is part of Streeterville, as are Navy Pier, the most visited attraction in Chicago, and the John Hancock Observatory, the eighth-most visited attraction in Chicago.

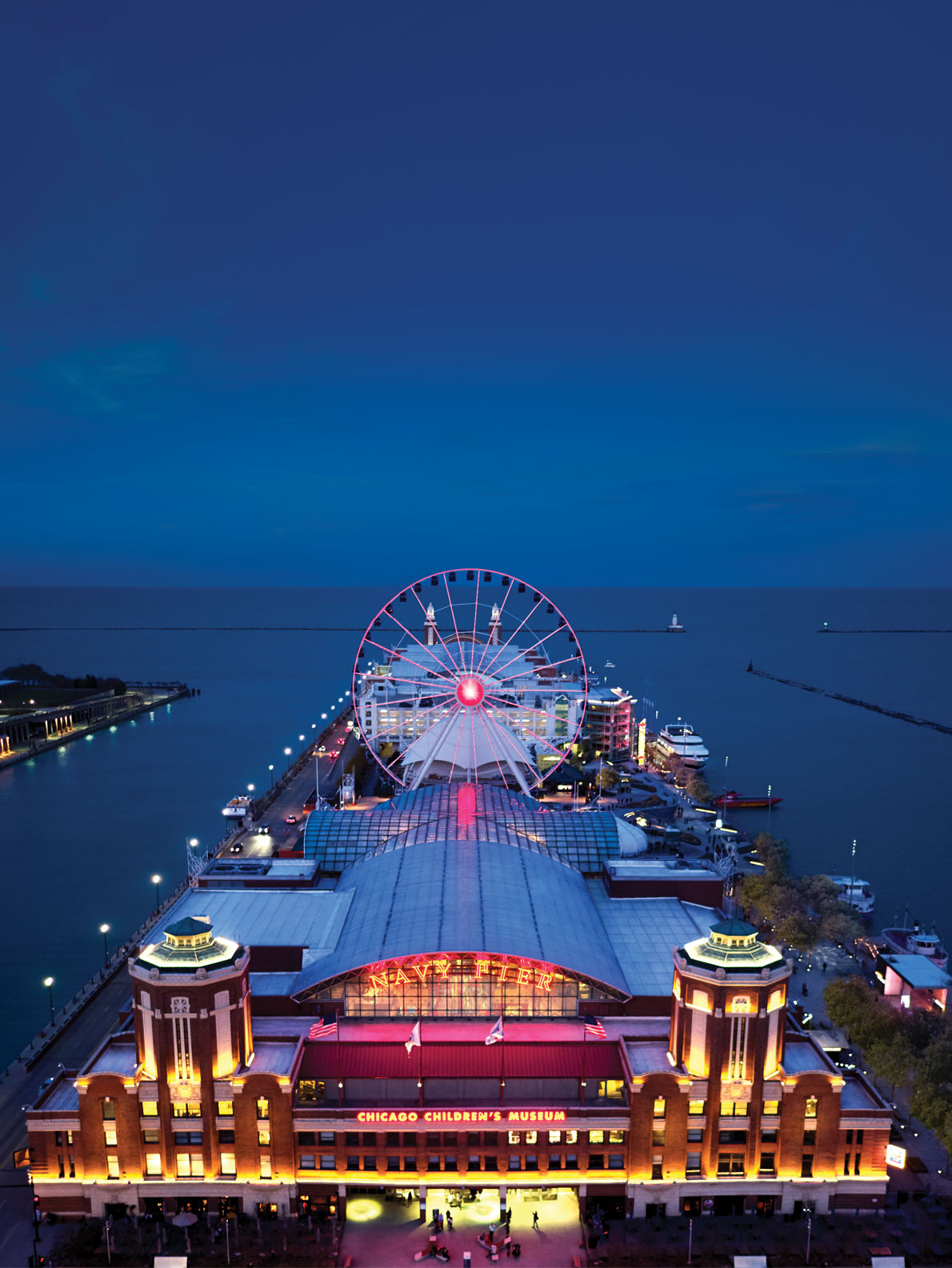
Aerial View of Navy Pier at Night

The area east of Michigan Avenue and north of the Chicago River had a split personality for much of the 20th century - the northern portion upscale residential, retail, and university uses and the area near the Chicago River and Navy Pier dedicated to shipping and factories. At the end of the 1960s, however, residential complexes such as Lake Point Tower (1965) and McClurg Court Center (1971) began to appear among the warehouses and by the end of the century, residential and retail dominated the entire area. The neighborhood now has a reputation as part of an upscale residential strip that balances the more industrial western portion of the Near North Side. In 2007, construction started on what would have been Chicago's tallest skyscraper, the Chicago Spire. It was to be located in the southeastern corner of the neighborhood, next to Lake Shore Drive. The Chicago Spire was originally supposed to be completed in 2010, but was later cancelled.

In the early 21st century, much of the southern part of the neighborhood that had previously contained warehouses and empty lots has undergone development, including the River East Center east of Columbus Drive. The River East Art Center serves as the primary retail hub apart from the Magnificent Mile. South Streeterville currently has numerous skyscrapers that are either proposed or already under construction such as a new tower at InterContinental Chicago and 500 North Lake Shore.

Streeterville Historic Districts

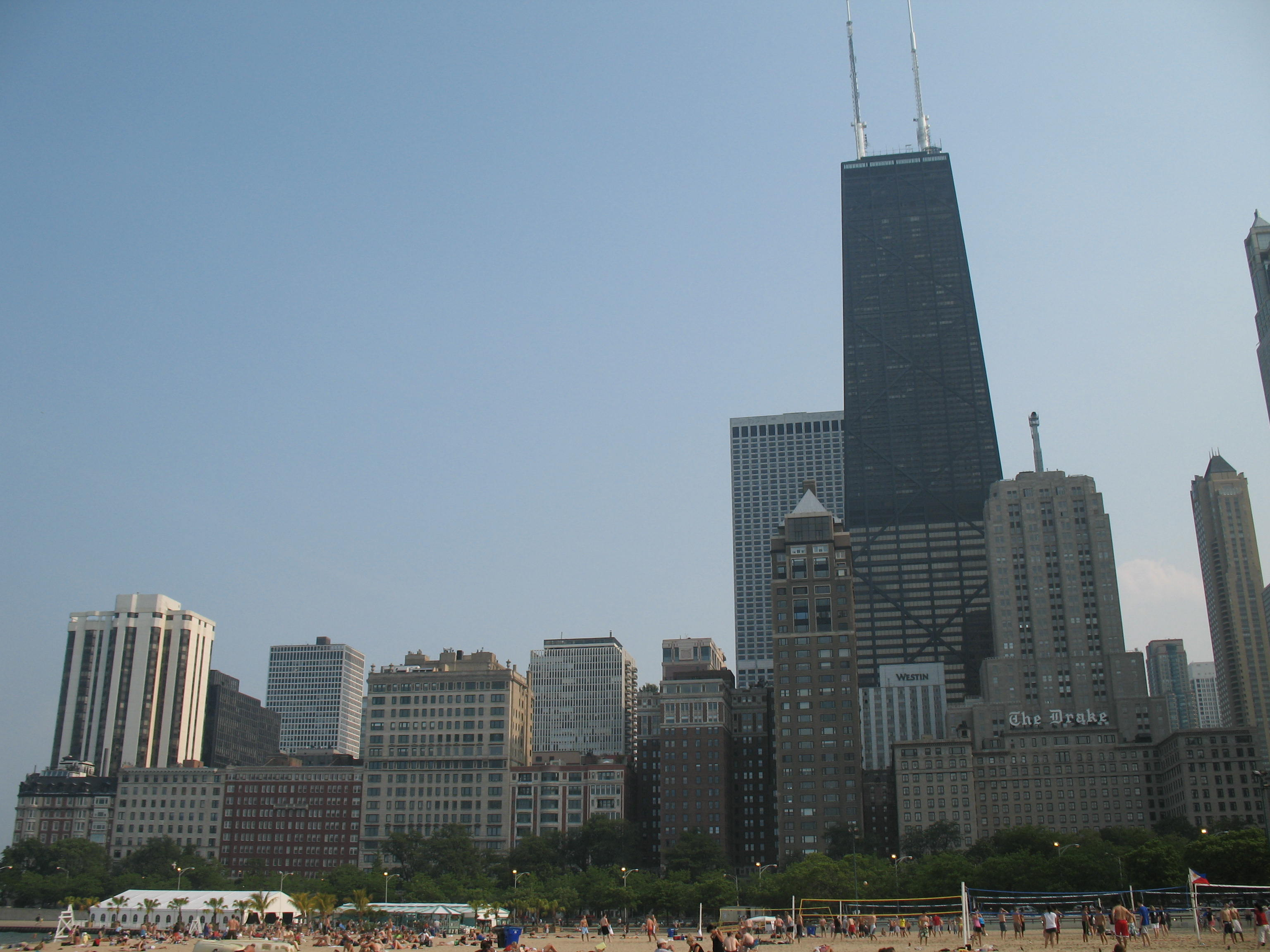
East Lake Shore Drive Historic District

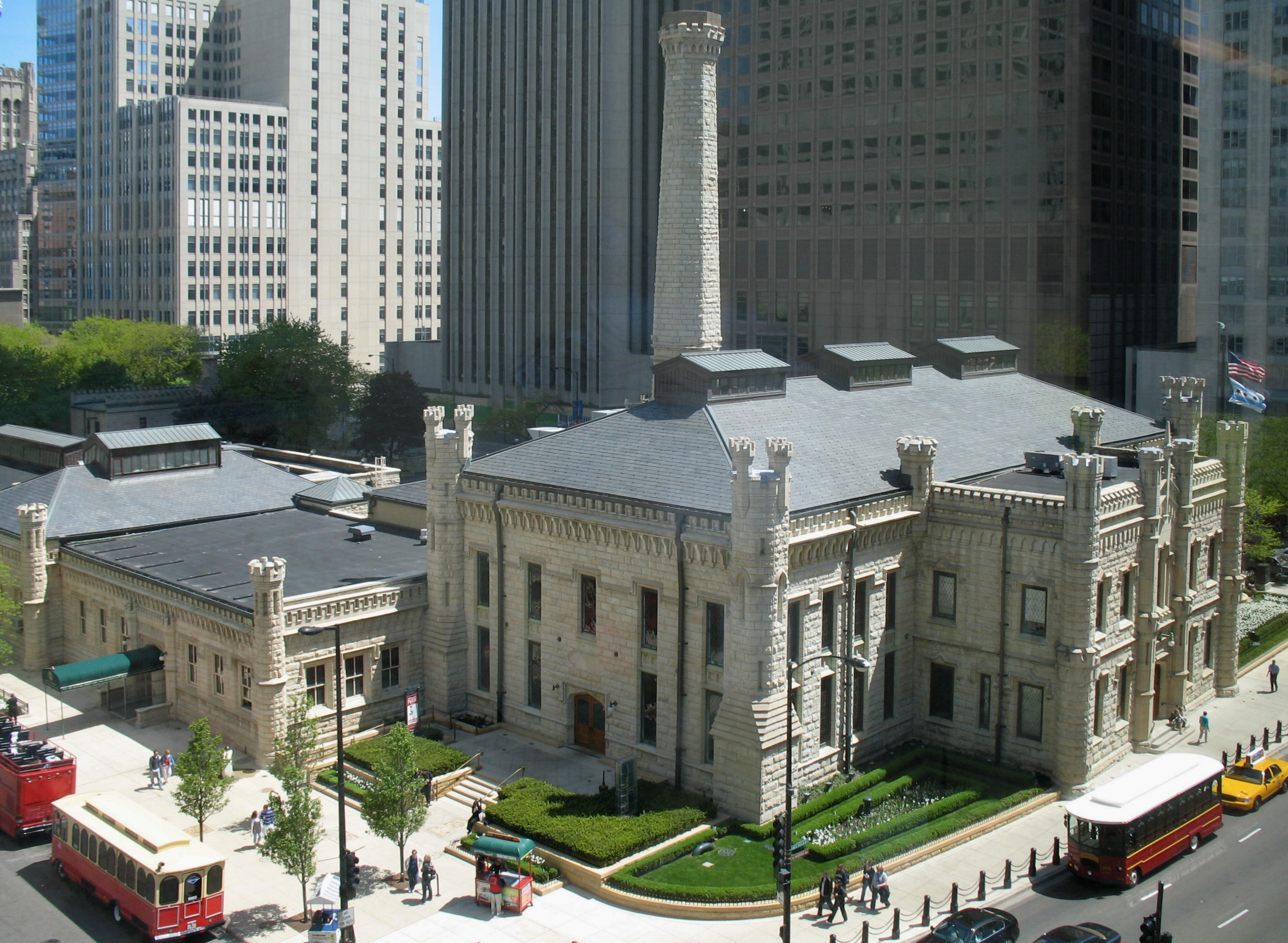
Old Chicago Water Tower District

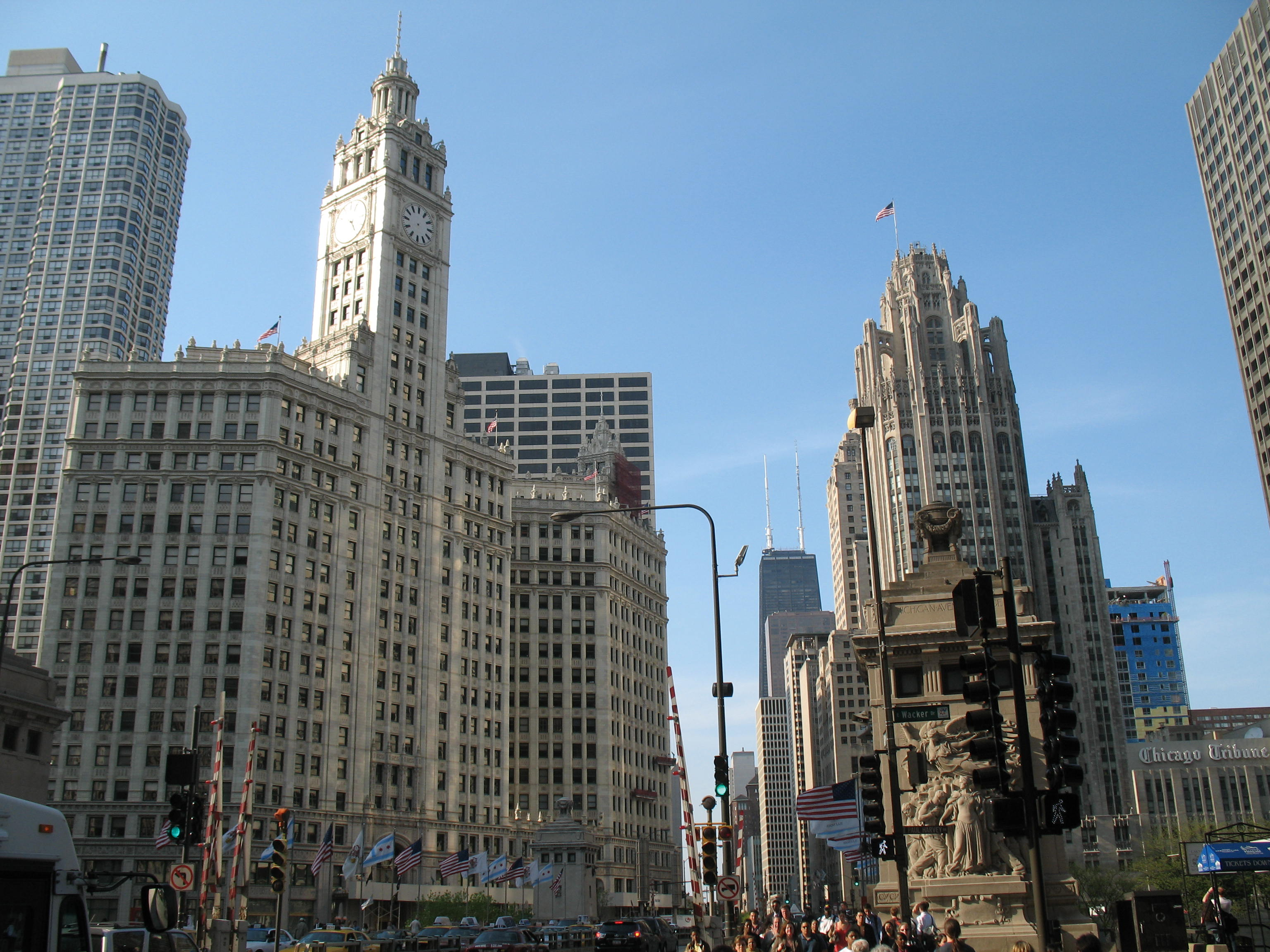
Michigan–Wacker Historic District

Streeterville hosts several landmarks and places that have been designated as historic districts. The East Lake Shore Drive Historic District, which consists of a row of early 20th century luxury apartments, sits on the northern edge of the district opposite Lake Michigan. The Old Chicago Water Tower District is located along Michigan Avenue where Streeterville meets the border of the River North and Gold Coast (Chicago) neighborhoods at Chicago Avenue. The Water Tower District contains the only public buildings that survived the 1871 Great Chicago Fire. Also, part of the Michigan–Wacker Historic District lies within Streeterville at the southern end of the Magnificent Mile and contains numerous high rises and skyscrapers built in the 1920s.

The neighborhood hosts several individual landmarks. The neighborhood hosts a National Historic Landmark, the Jean Baptiste Point Du Sable Homesite, the home of the first non-Native, husband of a Native woman, in Chicago. Properties in the neighborhood listed in the National Register of Historic Places include 257 East Delaware, the 860-880 Lake Shore Drive Apartments, the Drake Hotel, the Fourth Presbyterian Church of Chicago, the Navy Pier and the Palmolive Building. Other Chicago Landmarks in the neighborhood include Allerton Hotel, McGraw-Hill Building, Perkins, Fellows & Hamilton Office and Studio, Tribune Tower, and the Woman's Athletic Club. Notable buildings in the district include the skyscrapers on the Magnificent Mile:

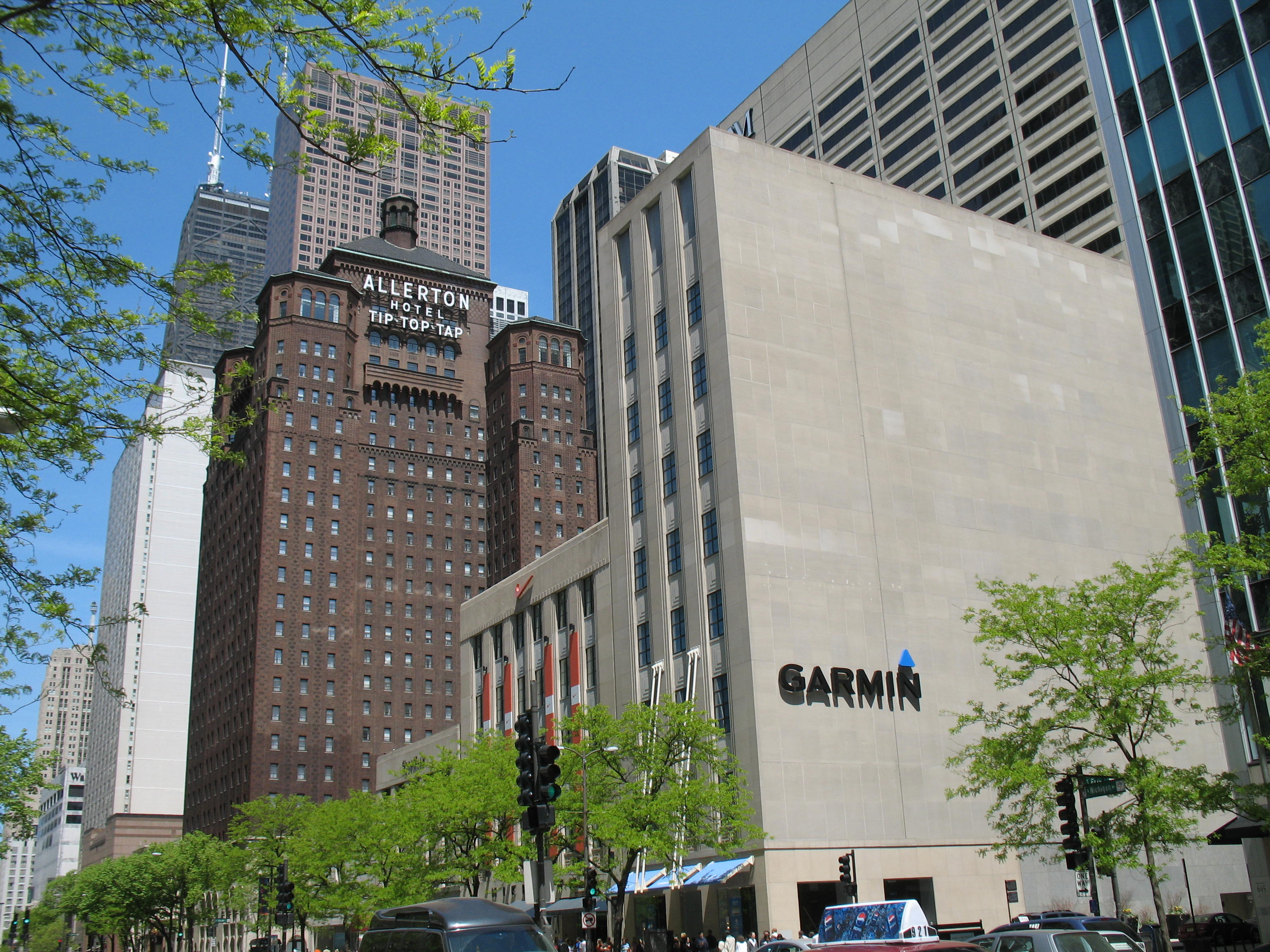
The Magnificent Mile has Chicago Landmarks such as the Allerton Hotel and many medium to high-end shopping destinations.

John Hancock Center (1,127 feet (344 m))
900 North Michigan (871 feet (265 m))
Water Tower Place (859 feet (262 m))
Park Tower (844 feet (257 m))
Olympia Centre (725 feet (221 m))
One Magnificent Mile (673 feet (205 m))
Chicago Place (608 feet (185 m))
Palmolive Building (565 feet (172 m)).

Non-Michigan Avenue skyscrapers in the neighborhood include the following:

Lake Point Tower (645 feet (197 m))
River East Center (644 feet (196 m))
North Pier Apartments (581 feet (177 m))
Onterie Center (570 feet (170 m))
Elysées Condominiums (529 feet (161 m))
401 East Ontario (515 feet (157 m))
The Streeter (514 feet (157 m))
Streeter Place (554 feet (169 m))
400 East Ohio Street (505 feet (154 m)).
One Bennett Park (837 feet (255 m))

Some of the notable buildings in the district that have not been designated are Wrigley Building and Museum of Contemporary Art, Chicago.

Streeterville portion of Lake Shore Drive

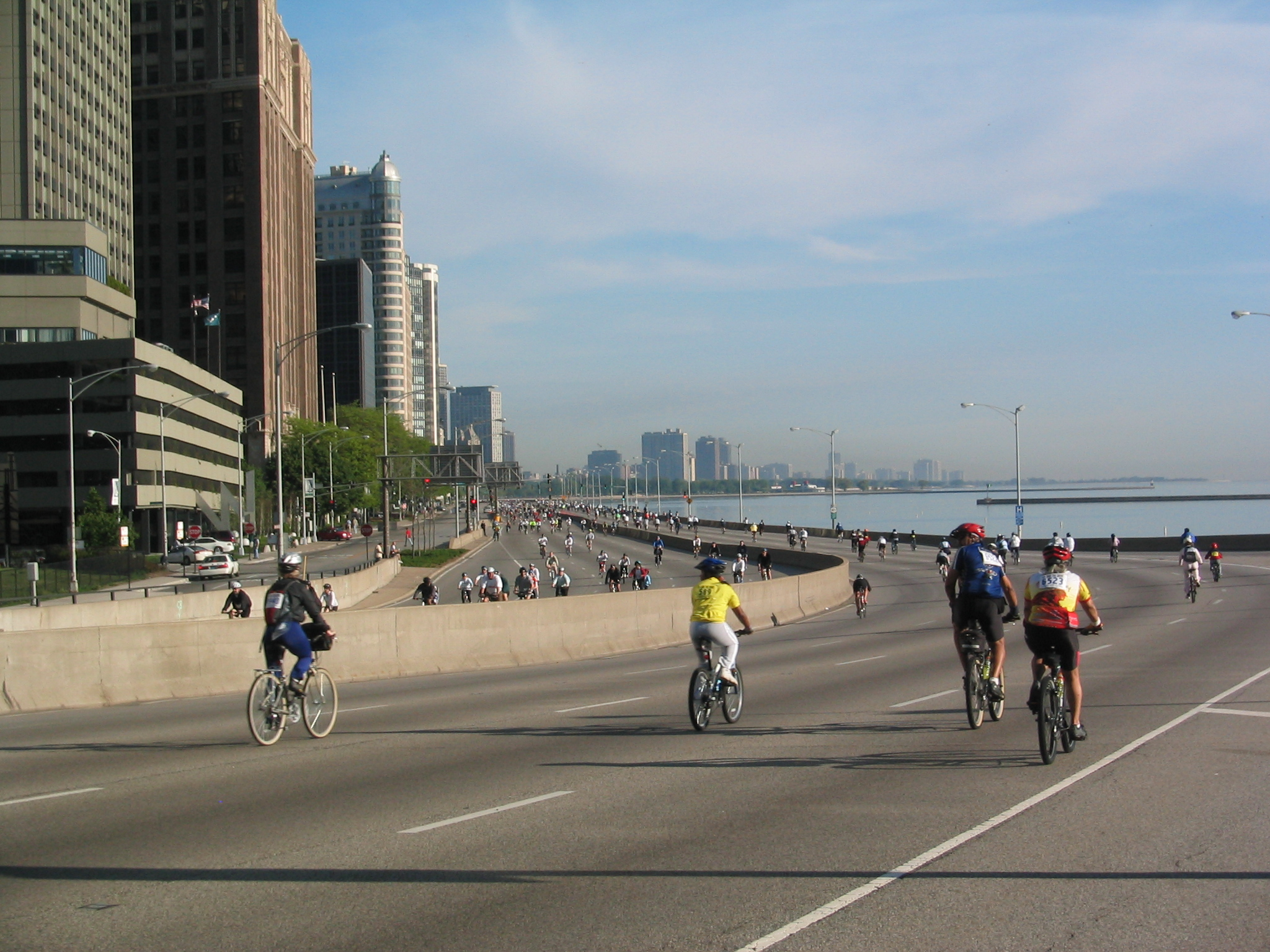
from south during Bike The Drive

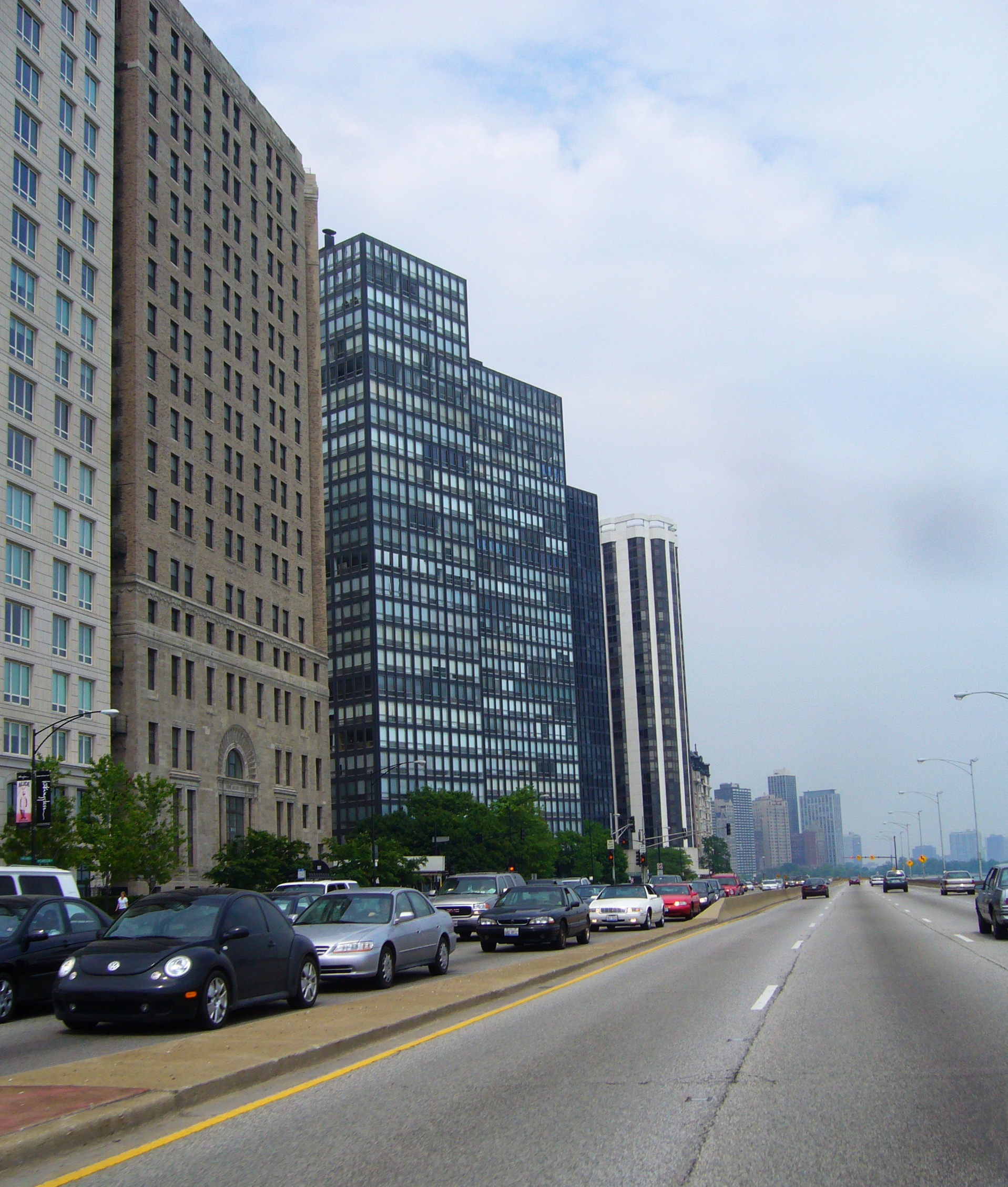
from south

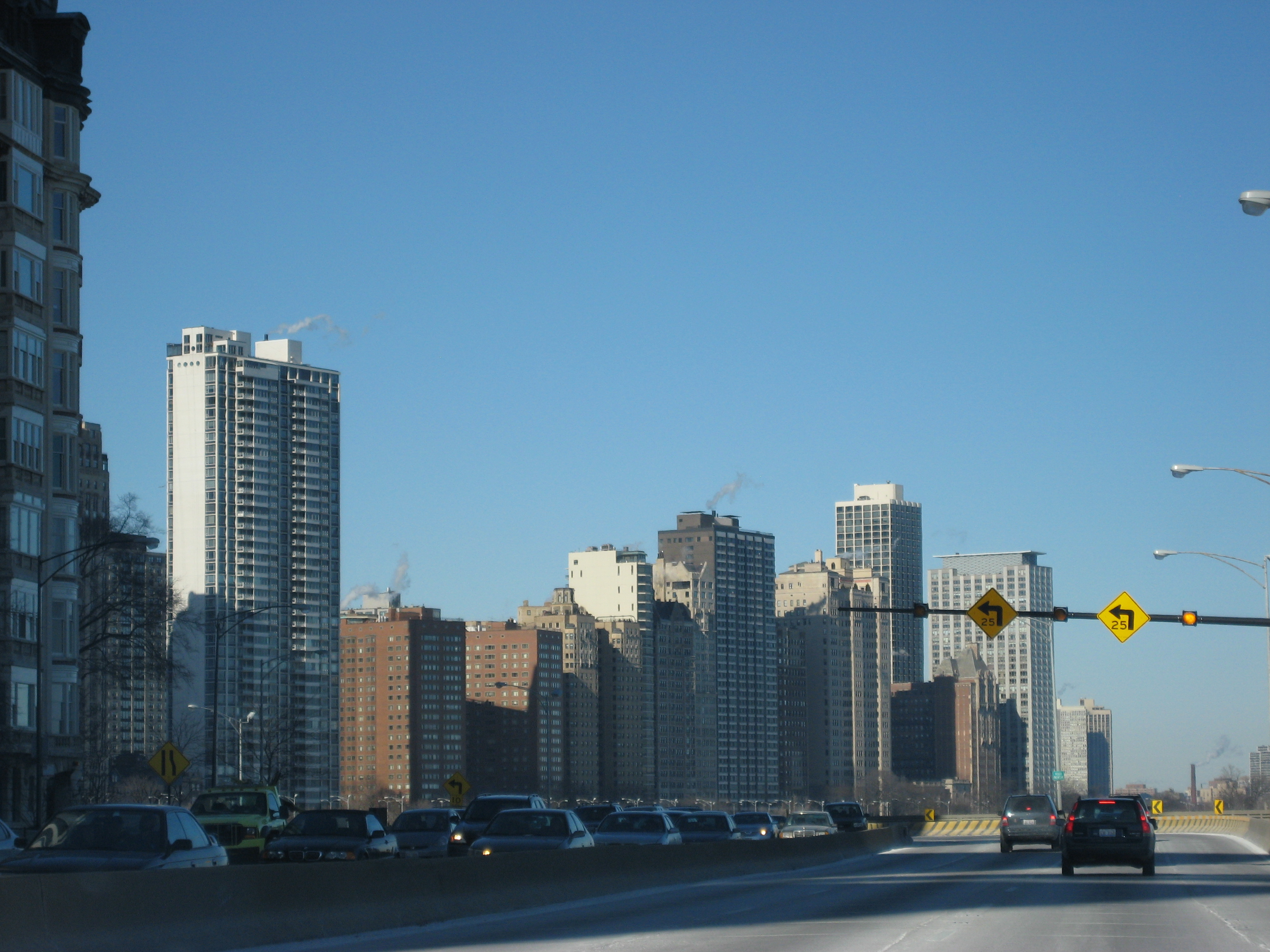
Gold Coast from Lake Shore Drive

The neighborhood hosts more than 25 hotels, including the only three five star hotels in the Midwestern United States, the Ritz Carlton, The Peninsula Hotel, and the Four Seasons Hotel Chicago as well as the historic Drake Hotel. Two of these host the highest rated spas in Illinois. In 2024, the Hotel Riu Plaza Chicago opened at 150 East Ontario Street.

== Economy ==
Qatar Airways operates an office in Suite 1310 at the John Hancock Center.

Playboy Enterprises' offices were on the 15th and 16th floors of 680 N. Lake Shore Drive until 2012.

Several consulates are in Streeterville. Countries with consulates include Bosnia and Herzegovina, Bulgaria, Chile, Denmark, Greece, Japan, Lithuania, and Switzerland.

== Education ==
Chicago Public Schools (CPS) operates public schools. Ogden International School serves the community, for grades K-8. Streeterville residents are zoned to Wells Community Academy High School. Any graduate from Ogden's 8th grade program may automatically move on to the 9th grade at Ogden, but students who did not graduate from Ogden's middle school must apply to the high school.

== Transportation ==
Streeterville is accessible via Lake Shore Drive with multiple direct exits in both directions. In addition, the Chicago 'L' has stops at Chicago and Grand stations on the Red Line, which runs along State Street immediately to the west of the neighborhood. From the Kennedy Expressway the Ohio Street exit feeds into Streeterville. Numerous Chicago Transit Authority bus routes run within the neighborhood, notably along Michigan Avenue, Grand Avenue, and Chicago Avenue. During warm-weather months, water taxis and sightseeing boats ply the Chicago River along the south edge of the neighborhood and Navy Pier handles similar Lake Michigan water traffic.

== Healthcare ==
The Streeterville neighborhood also contains many healthcare facilities that are based around the Northwestern University's Feinberg School of Medicine. Feinberg's main hospital is the Northwestern Memorial Hospital with a variety of specialty hospitals also in the neighborhood including the Prentice Women's Hospital, Lurie Children's Hospital, and Shirley Ryan AbilityLab. In addition to the hospital buildings, the neighborhood contains a variety of medical research buildings that supplement patient care at the hospitals.

== See also ==
- Centennial Fountain
- List of tallest buildings in Chicago
- Cap Streeter
