= Atwater Apartments =

Skyscraper in Chicago, Illinois

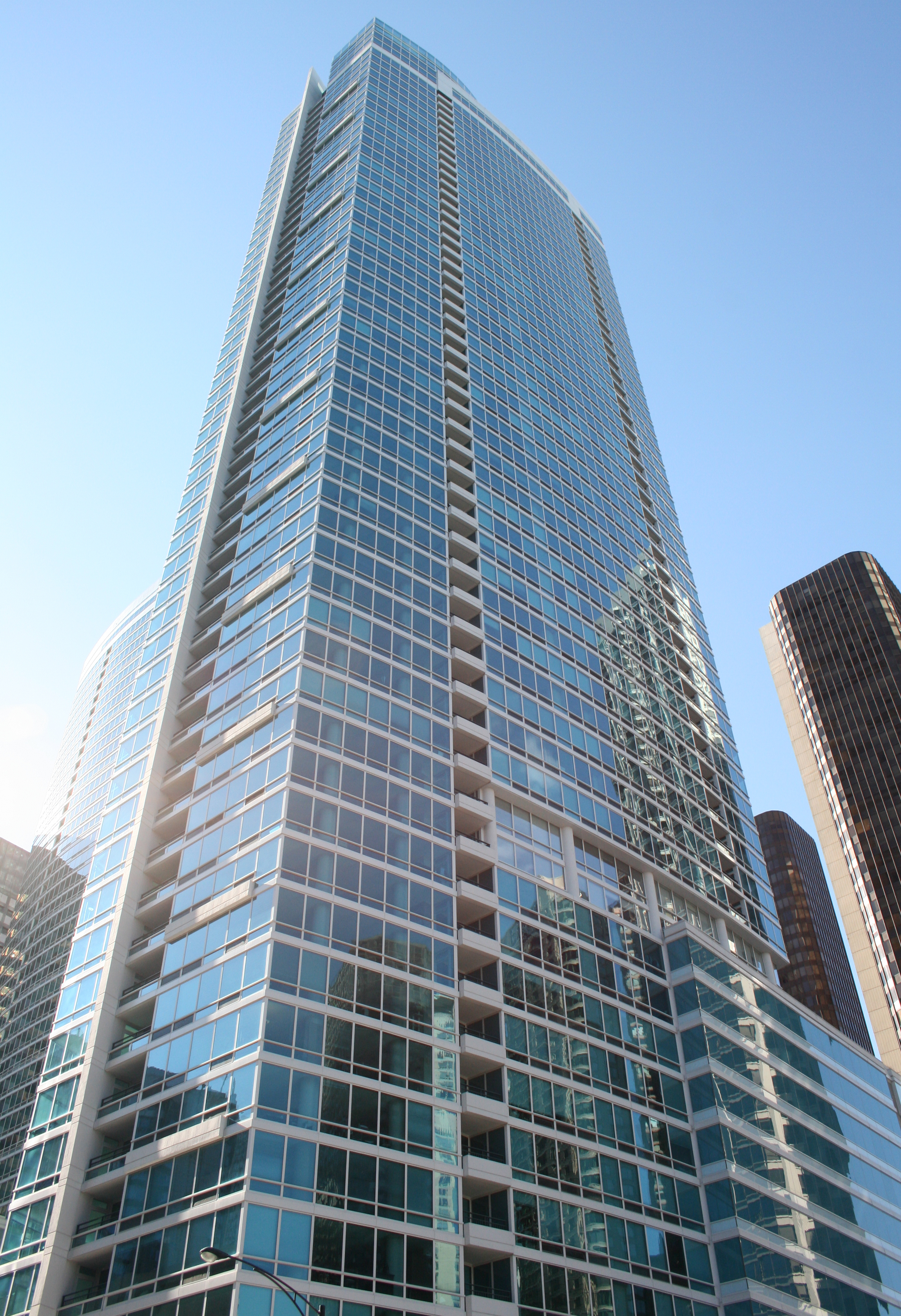
- Interactive map of the Atwater Apartments area

General information
- Location: 355 East Ohio Street, Chicago, Illinois
- Coordinates: 41.89219°N 87.6184°W
- Completed: 2009

Technical details
- Floor count: 54

Atwater Apartments is an apartment skyscraper adjacent to the Streeterville neighborhood in Chicago, Illinois, in the United States. It was previously called Streeter Place.

The building was completed in 2009. It contains 54 stories, 480 units, and many amenities.

== See also ==
- List of tallest buildings in Chicago
