= 474 North Lake Shore Drive =

Skyscraper in Chicago, Illinois

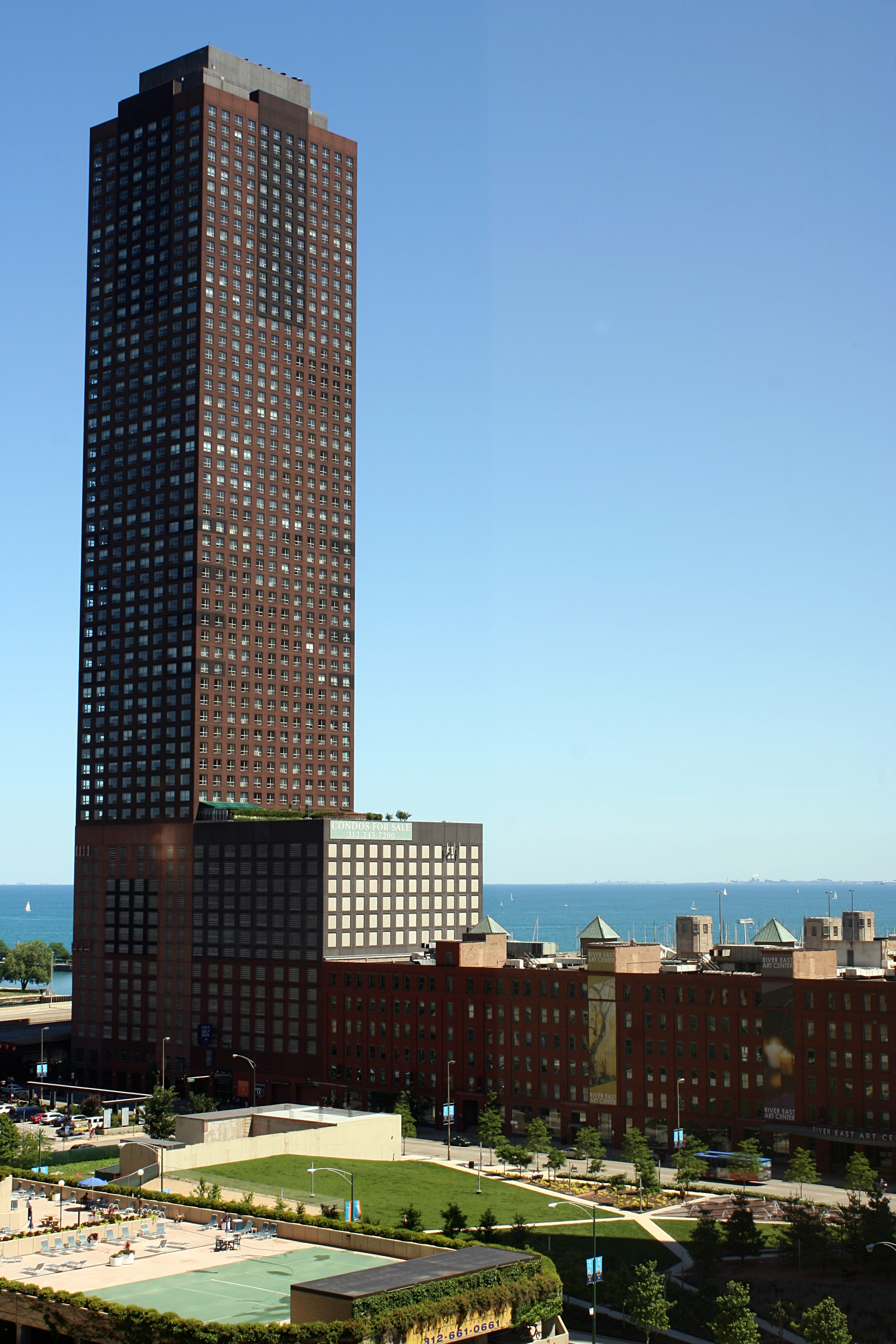
- Interactive map of the 474 North Lake Shore Drive area

General information
- Type: Residential
- Location: 474 North Lake Shore Drive, Chicago, Illinois
- Coordinates: 41.8908°N 87.6146°W
- Completed: 1990

Height
- Roof: 581 ft (177 m)

Technical details
- Floor count: 61

Design and construction
- Architects: Dubin, Dubin, Black & Moutoussamy

474 North Lake Shore Drive is a 581 ft (177m) tall residential skyscraper in Chicago, Illinois.

It was completed in 1990 as North Pier Apartments and has 61 floors. Dubin, Dubin, Black & Moutoussamy designed the building, which is the 43rd tallest and the tallest precast concrete panel clad building when completed, in Chicago. The buildings façade has dark gray, maroon, and pink panels in an abstract pattern. It was named after North Pier, a long building to the west along Ogden Slip. It has been described by the architects to be masculine counterpart to the curvaceous Lake Point Tower nearby. It was renamed 474 North Lake Shore Drive in 2005, when the building was converted to condominiums.

== See also ==
- List of tallest buildings in Chicago

== Position in Chicago's skyline ==
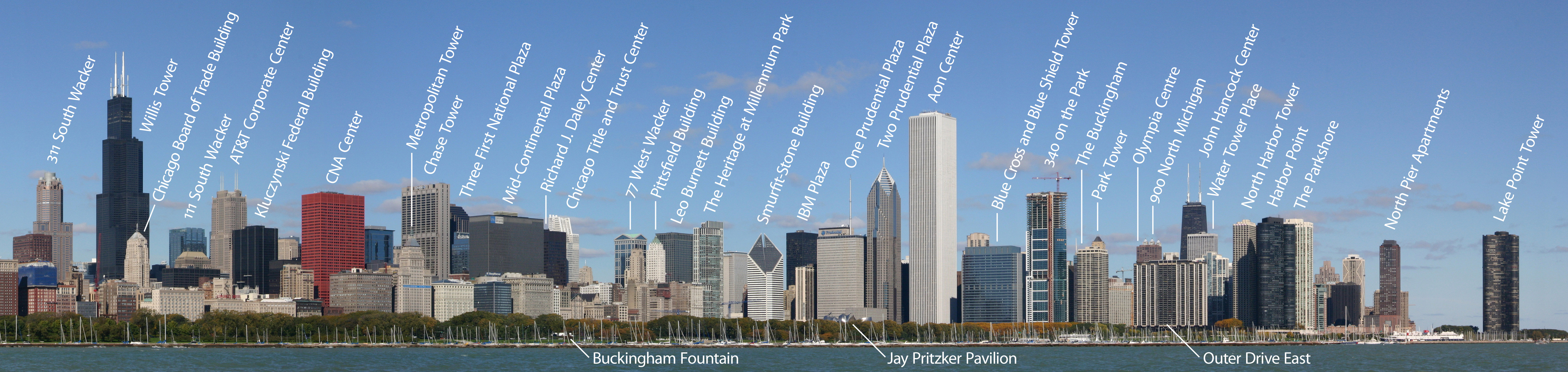
