= George Streeter =

American criminal (c. 1837–1921)

George Wellington "Cap" Streeter (c. 1837 – January 22, 1921) was an American who became infamous in Chicago for his real estate schemes and oftentimes bizarre eccentricity. From 1886 to 1921, Streeter, often through forgery and other manipulative means, attempted to lay claim to 186 acres (0.75 km^{2}) of Lake Michigan shoreline from various owners. Failing in his efforts to defraud wealthy landowners, he turned to selling the disputed land to uninformed buyers. A portion of the real estate near downtown Chicago, known as Streeterville, is named for him.

== Streeter in legend ==
During a storm on July 10, 1886, the former Mississippi River boat captain and circus owner ran his steamboat, the 35-ton Reutan, onto a sandbar 451 feet (137 m) off Chicago's north shore near the foot of Superior Street.

Unable to move the vessel, which slowly silted into place, Streeter claimed it made up the independent "United States District of Lake Michigan" and thereby was not subject to the laws of Illinois or Chicago.

Ever since the downtown cleanup after the Great Fire in 1871, Lake Michigan had been used as a dump by building contractors looking to get rid of backfill and general rubble. Streeter invited such contractors to dump their rubble on the sandbar where the Reutan sat, extending the size of his land considerably. Over time, this landfill connected the Reutan to the city. As the landmass grew, collecting more dumped rubble as well as silt from the lake, Streeter began to issue deeds to the land to others who saw themselves as "homesteaders" in the growing city of Chicago. City planners and founders saw otherwise.

That summer, industrialist N.K. Fairbank, who claimed rights to the area, arrived to inform Streeter he was an illegal squatter and would have to leave. Streeter chased Fairbank off with a shotgun. Shortly thereafter, Streeter also chased away the constables who had come to evict him. Further attempts to remove them were met with gunfire and pots of scalding water. After one such raid resulted in his arrest for assault with a deadly weapon, Streeter was acquitted on the grounds that birdshot was not considered deadly.

Although Fairbank sued Streeter in 1890 and won, Streeter maintained his hold on the District, which was now home to prostitutes, the homeless and other "undesirables." In 1892, it was estimated that the land was worth around $300,000, a substantial sum in that era.

During the World's Columbian Exposition, Streeter refloated the Reutan and used it to ferry passengers between Streeterville and the exposition grounds at Jackson Park.

From 1894 on, there were many attempts to forcibly remove Streeter from the district, often for violating laws that prohibited the sale of liquor on Sunday. In cases in which police were injured by axes and gunfire, Streeter and his men were invariably found not guilty due to acting in self-defense. Streeter's fight for what he considered his land continued until his death on January 22, 1921, although he and his second wife had left Streeterville to move to East Chicago, Indiana, in 1918. The Streeters' heirs continued to lay claim on the land until April 1928, when the courts ruled in favor of Chicago Title and Trust. Despite all the bad blood, the mayor of Chicago attended Streeter's funeral.

== Reality ==
Streeter was born in Flint, Michigan, in 1837. He served in the Civil War, but was not a captain. He was a salesman, the owner of a traveling circus, a logger, and a miner. After his first wife left him to join a vaudeville troupe, he moved to Chicago and acquired the steamship Reutan. He and his common-law wife planned to use the Reutan to run guns to Latin America. But fuel was expensive, and the distances great, and he saw an opportunity close by, in Chicago.

Streeter clearly lied about his discovery of the "District of Lake Michigan". In 1886, he referenced a map published in 1821 to determine that his "District" was outside the city limits. A storm did not smash Streeter's ship into a sandbar on the night of July 10, 1886. Weather reports for that night make no mention of a storm. Streeter did not really believe that he could fill in the shoreline and legally claim the new land. A witness in Streeter's 1902 land fraud trial testified that Streeter had purposely set out to contest the claims of the wealthy shoreline owners. Contractor Hank Brusser told the court that Streeter asked him to fill in portions of the shoreline in order to create confusion over land titles. According to Brusser, Streeter said that "They (the owners of the shoreline) will have to buy us off" and that "We'll get a million out of it". The recorder of the general land office, Chester H. Brush, testified that Streeter's title was "a clumsy forgery" with signatures mismatched with offices. Silas Lamoreaux was commissioner and not recorder; Hoke Smith was Secretary of the Interior, not secretary to sign patents.

In reality, Streeter orchestrated an elaborate scheme to steal valuable shoreline property. He did not crash his ship on a sandbar, he piloted it to the foot of Superior Street and then obtained permission from the shoreline owner, Fairbank, to leave his ship there temporarily. He left it there for years. Streeter refused to move his ship insisting that he had title to the shoreline, producing a forged land title, concocted his story of crashing on a sandbar, and then proceeded to sell lots that he did not legally own. He even began collecting property taxes for the lots he sold and kept detailed tax records.

In 1893 police removed Streeter and his boat from Fairbank's land. Streeter then moved to the posh Tremont Hotel from where he proceeded to expand his operations. He sold shoreline belonging to Fairbank, the William Ogden estate, the Farwell family, Potter Palmer, the Pine Street Land Association and the Chicago Title and Trust Company. In all, Streeter claimed to own 186 acres (0.75 km^{2}) of land between the mouth of the Chicago River and Oak Street. The reality was that the Lincoln Park Board had worked to fill in the shoreline in that area, so that they could build Lake Shore Drive on the infill.

Streeter continued to sell lots to people who either believed his story or believed his forged federal land grant. To bolster his claims, to pressure owners to pay him off, and to assuage those who had bought lots from him in earnest, Streeter staged a series of "invasions", when he would lead a small group of squatters carrying shacks to the lake shore to quickly set up settlements. The shoreline owners would respond by sending thugs and/or police to evict them. Streeter would then vociferously complain that he was a victim of a capitalistic conspiracy to rob him of his land. This repeated itself again and again until Streeter was convicted of manslaughter, in 1902, and sent to prison. Streeter died at the age of 84, in 1921, of pneumonia.

The site of Streeter's shanty is currently occupied by the John Hancock Center, and the surrounding Chicago neighborhood is known as Streeterville.
