= River East Center =

Skyscraper in Chicago, Illinois

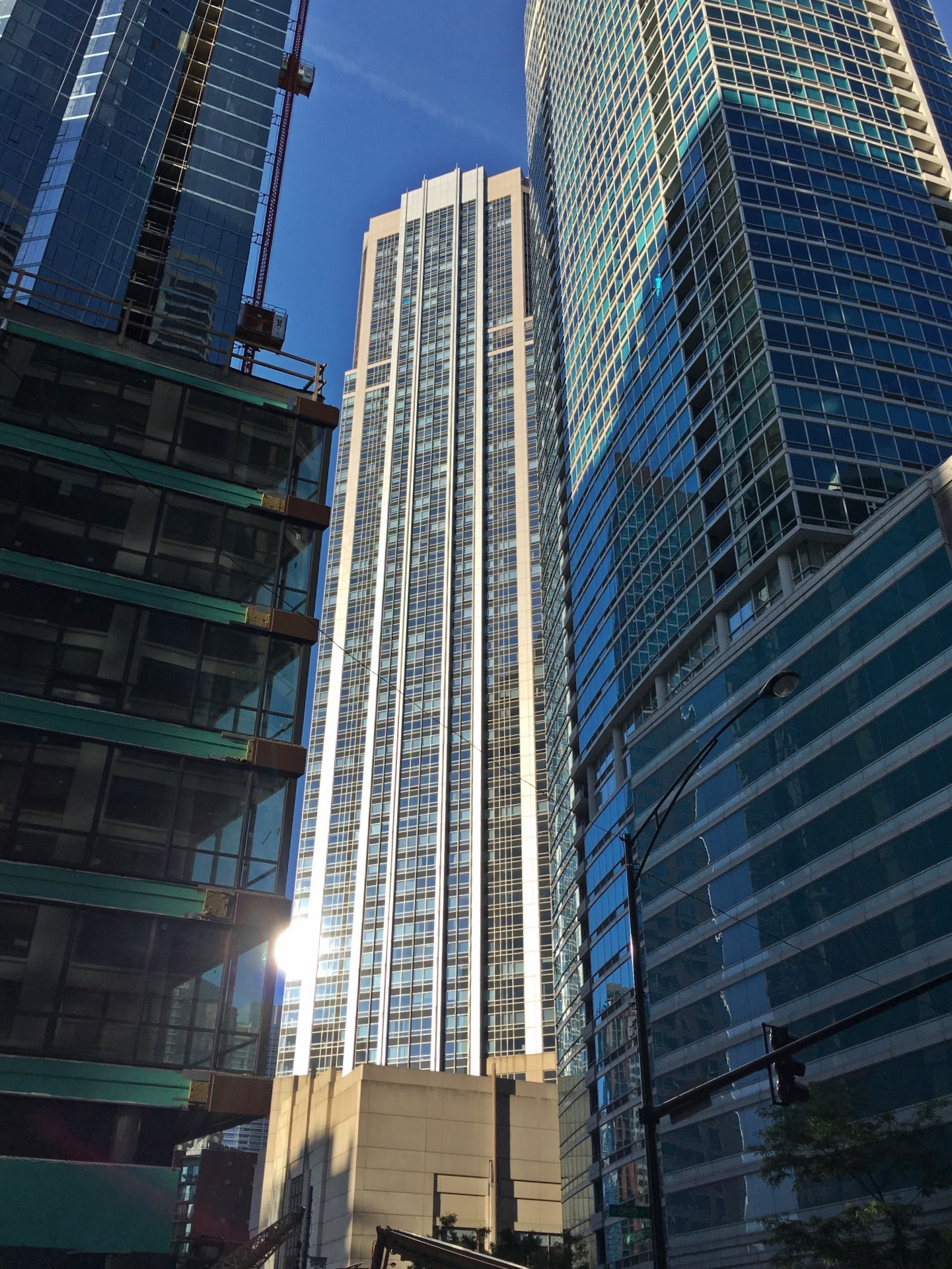

- Location within Chicago metropolitan area

General information
- Type: Residential
- Location: 512 North McClurg Court, Chicago, Illinois, United States
- Coordinates: 41°53′29″N 87°37′05.5″W
- Completed: 2001

Height
- Roof: 644 ft (196 m)

Technical details
- Floor count: 58

Design and construction
- Architect: DeStefano + Partners

River East Center is a Chicago skyscraper that is a part of the larger River East complex.

== Description ==
The tower in River East Center, containing 620 condominium units, stands at 644 feet (196 m) with 58 floors, and was completed in 2001. The building, designed by DeStefano + Partners, originally called for spires atop of the roof on all sides that would have significantly raised the official height to 680 feet. As it stands today, River East Center is the third tallest all-residential building in Chicago.

The building is on the main branch of the Chicago River. A part of the Riverwalk runs along this complex of buildings.

The building shares a common base with the nearby 18 story Embassy Suites Lakefront. The base of River East Center also contains an AMC Theatre, the largest cinema in the city of Chicago with 21 screens.

== See also ==
- List of skyscrapers
- List of tallest buildings in the United States
- List of tallest buildings in Chicago
- World's tallest structures
