= Lake Point Tower =

Residential skyscraper in Chicago, Illinois

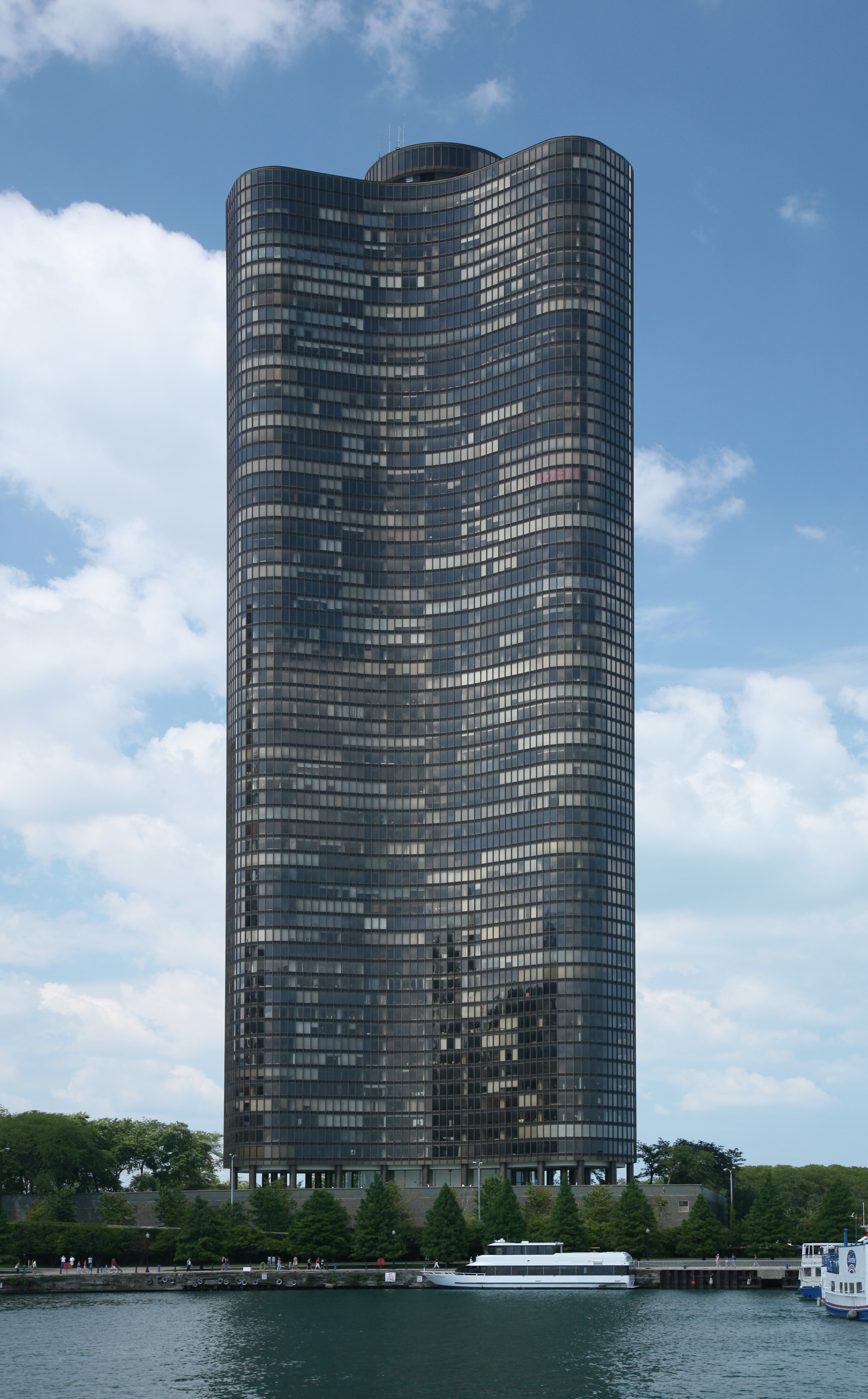
- Lake Point Tower in 2008

General information
- Location: Chicago, Illinois, United States
- Coordinates: 41°53′30″N 87°36′44″W
- Construction started: 1965
- Completed: 1968

Height
- Roof: 645 ft (197 m)

Technical details
- Floor count: 70
- Floor area: 1,299,990 ft^{2} (120,773 m^{2})

Design and construction
- Architects: Schipporeit & Heinrich

Website
- lakepointtower.org

Lake Point Tower is a residential skyscraper located on a promontory of the Lake Michigan waterfront in Chicago, just north of the Chicago River at 505 North Lake Shore Drive. Completed in 1968, it has a curving three-wing design. The building is in the Streeterville neighborhood on the Near North Side and is adjacent to Navy Pier; it is the city's only skyscraper east of Lake Shore Drive.

== Development ==
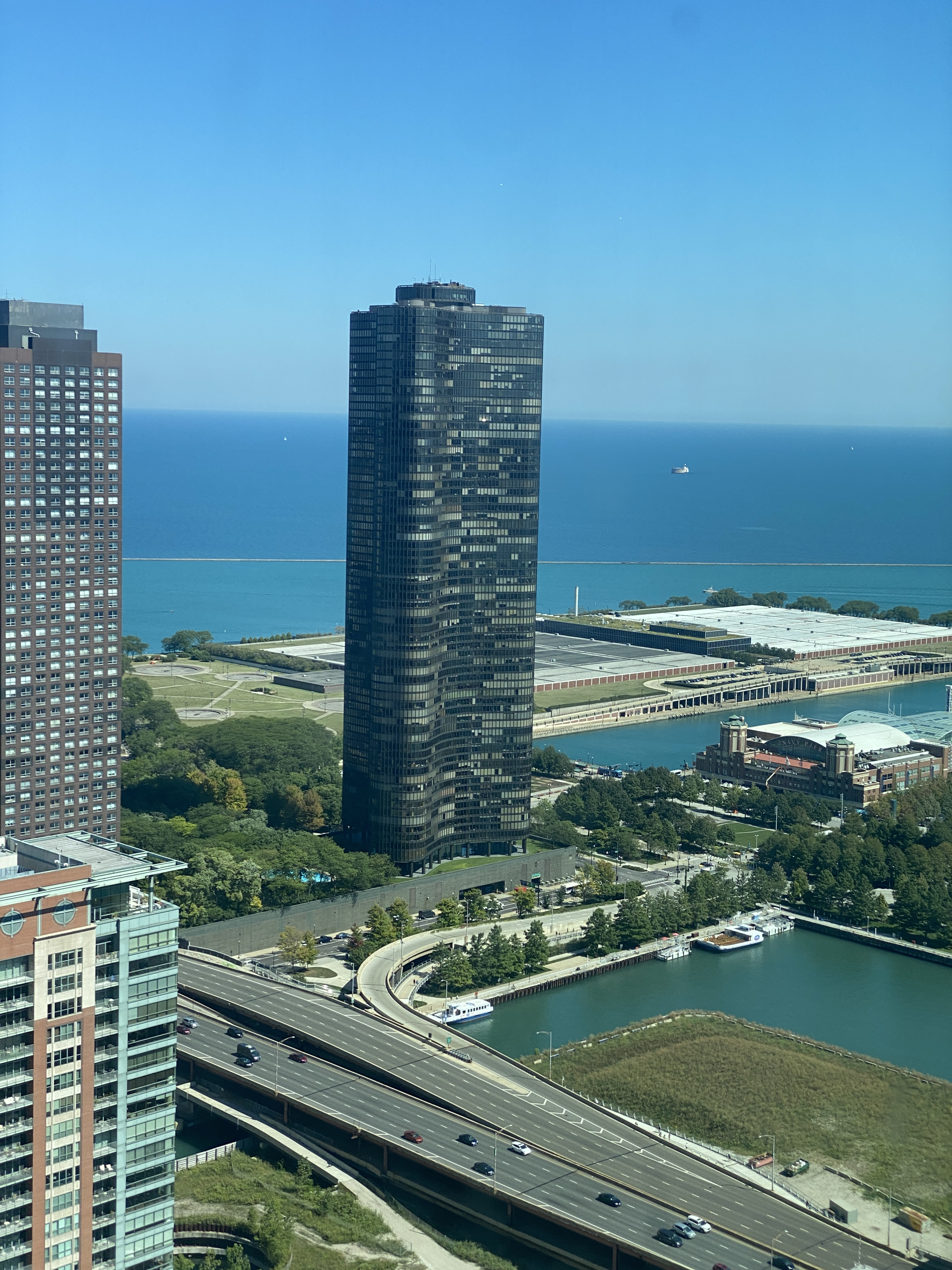
Lake Point Tower from St. Regis Chicago between Navy Pier and Lake Shore Drive, 2022

The architects for Lake Point Tower were John Heinrich and George Schipporeit, working under the firm name of Schipporeit and Heinrich; the two were students of Ludwig Mies van der Rohe, one of the best known architects of the Bauhaus movement and International Style school, who taught at the Illinois Institute of Technology in Chicago. Lake Point Tower was completed in 1968, is approximately 645 feet (197 m) tall, and was the tallest apartment building in the world at that time. The project developer was William F. Hartnett, Jr., chairman and founder of Hartnett-Shaw Development Company, which was responsible for more than 260 residential and commercial real estate developments in the United States from 1961–1983.

Because of its height and lakeside site, the skyscraper had to be designed to withstand high winds. At the center of the building is a triangular core, 59 feet wide, that contains nine elevators and three stairwells. This core holds all of the vertical weight of the building, allowing the perimeter columns on the facade to be much smaller.

Radiating from the core are three arms that form an asymmetrical Y-shaped floor plan. The original four-armed design was changed to a three-armed design (120° apart). The outer walls are curved to allow multiple distinct views from single apartments.

This building's tall, curved, three-wing 'Y' shape was an inspiration for the Burj Khalifa tower in Dubai, United Arab Emirates by Chicago-born architect Adrian Smith.

== Other features ==
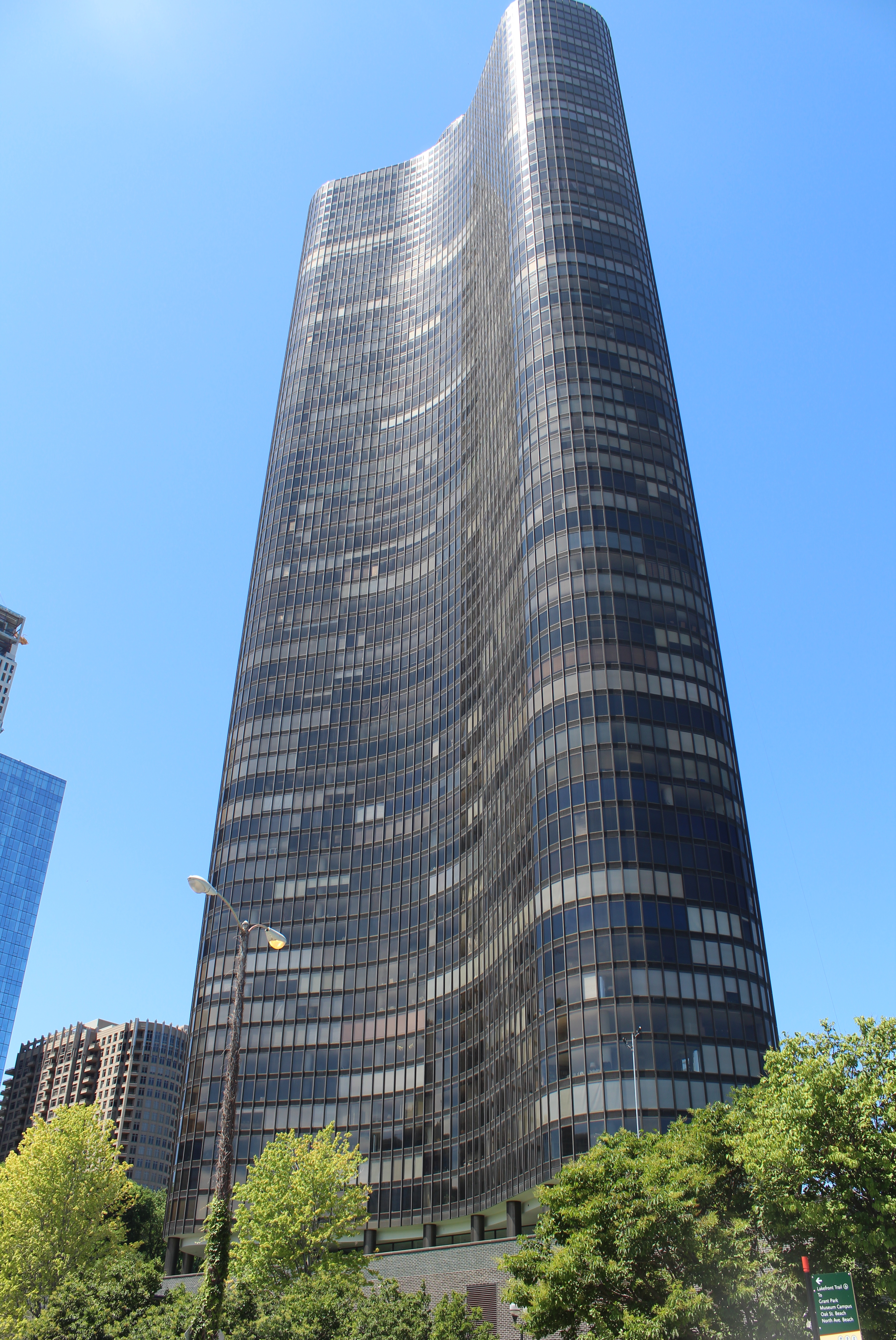
Looking up at the tower in July 2018

Known for its curves and picturesque location, Lake Point Tower is the only major private structure on the east side of Lake Shore Drive. Its position between Lake Shore Drive and Navy Pier allows for unobstructed views in all directions. These views are protected by ordinances that limit construction on the city's waterfront.

Lake Point Tower was one of the first high-rise residential buildings in the world to feature all-electric appliances. It pioneered the concept of the "Park in the City," as the first residential complex in a major city to have its own two-and-one-half acre park—including a playground, pool, duck pond, and waterfalls — three stories above ground. There are shops and restaurants on the first two levels of the complex, under the park.

== Film and television shot on location ==
Lake Point Tower has been host to many shoots including:

- Raw Deal (1986)
- Folks! (1991)
- Straight Talk (1992) This film featured Dolly Parton and James Woods, and had Parton's character living in Lake Point Tower.
- While You Were Sleeping (1995) Parts of this film, starring Sandra Bullock and Peter Gallagher, were shot in Lake Point Tower.
- Meet the Parents (2000)
- Category 6: Day of Destruction (2004) In an outtake of this film, it is destroyed by a tornado in news footage.
- The Lake House (2006) Hospital reception area filmed in Lake Point Tower's lobby.
- Divergent (2014) Briefly shown abandoned and decayed in a future Chicago. Huge Lake Michigan is shown to have transformed into a wetland in the same shot.
- Station Eleven (2021) Frank's (Jeevan's brother) condominium.

== Position in Chicago's skyline ==
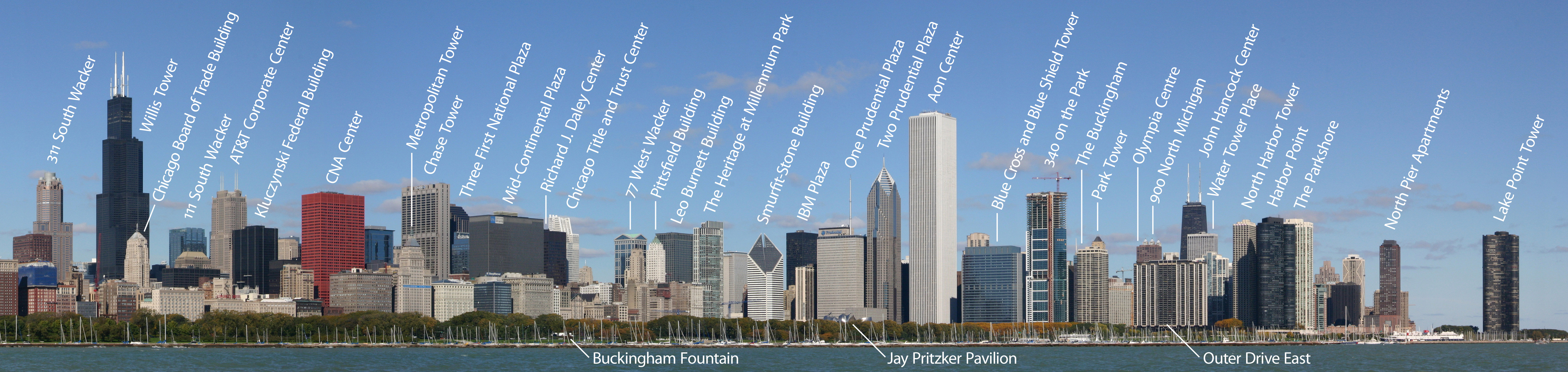

== See also ==
- Chicago architecture
- List of buildings
- List of skyscrapers
- List of tallest buildings in Chicago
- List of tallest buildings in the United States
- World's tallest structures
- Harbor Point (skyscraper)
- Park Tower Condominium (Chicago)
