= North Pier Light =

North Pier Light may refer to:

- Duluth North Pier Light in Duluth, Minnesota
- Erie Harbor North Pier Light on Presque Isle in Erie, Pennsylvania
- Kenosha North Pier Light in Kenosha County, Wisconsin
- Sturgeon Bay Canal North Pierhead Light near Sturgeon Bay in Door County, Wisconsin
