= Inn of Chicago =

Hotel in Chicago, Illinois

Coordinates: 41.8926°N 87.6229°W

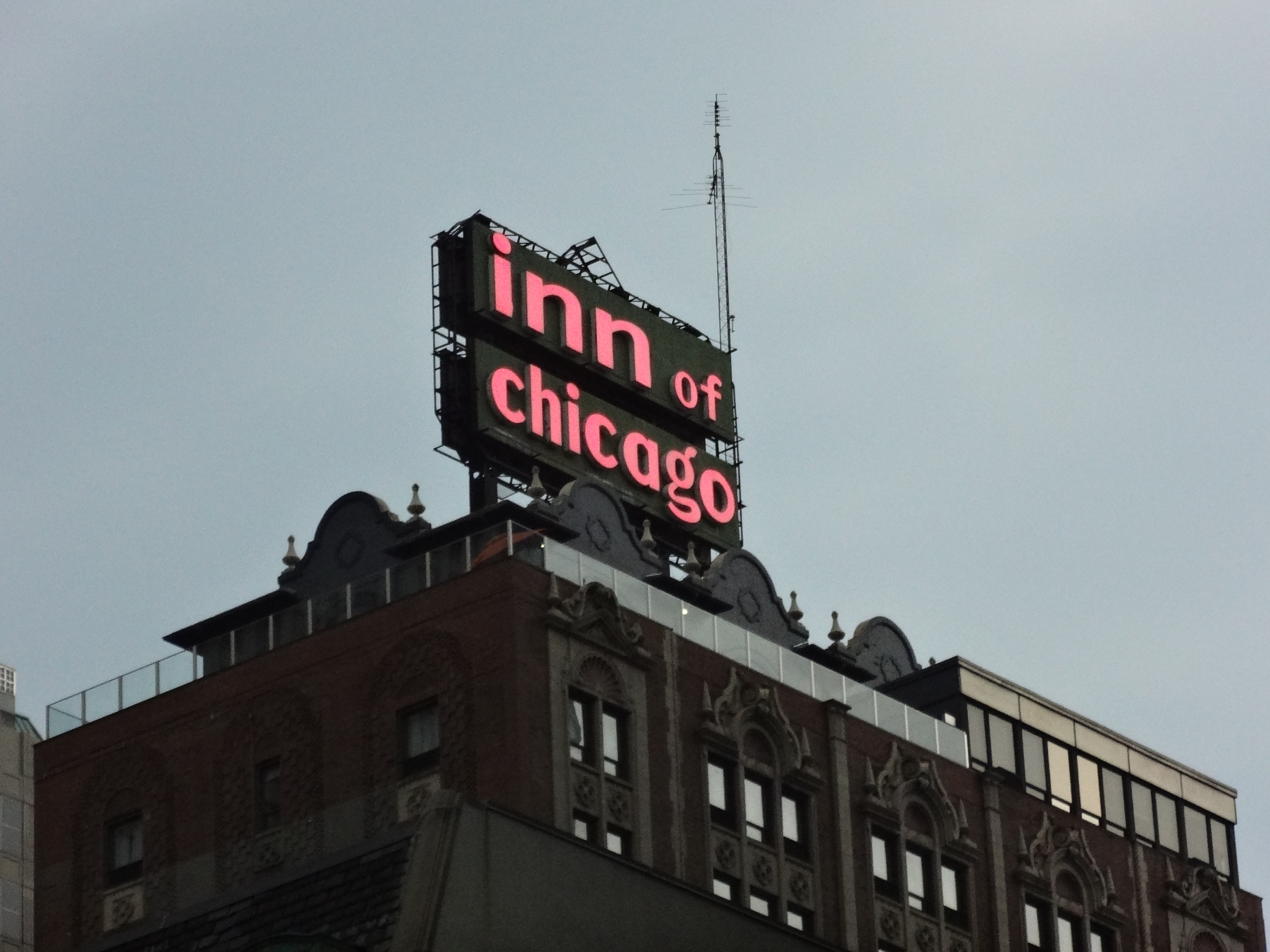
- Interactive map of the Inn of Chicago area
- Former names: Hotel St. Clair

General information
- Location: 162 East Ohio Street, Chicago, IL 60611
- Year built: 1927
- Opened: 1928; 98 years ago
- Renovated: 1982, 2003
- Cost: $3 million (equivalent to $56.3 million in 2025)
- Renovation cost: $13 million (equivalent to $43.4 million in 2025)

Height
- Height: 250 feet (76 m)

Technical details
- Floor count: 22

Design and construction
- Architecture firm: Oman & Lihienthal

The Inn of Chicago, is a historic hotel located at 162 East Ohio Street in the Streeterville neighborhood of Chicago. It was built in 1927 as the Hotel St. Clair.

== Location ==
The 250 ft (76 m) Inn of Chicago Magnificent Mile Hotel is located on the northwest corner of Ohio Street and St. Clair, one block east of the Magnificent Mile shopping district in downtown Chicago, Illinois.

== History ==
The Hotel St. Clair was built in 1927, to designs by Oman & Lihienthal and decorated by Geo. P. Davidson. Half of the 21-story building was designated one-bedroom residences to Chicago's most prominent figures of the 1920s. The remainder was hotel rooms and was frequented by well-known guests such as Judy Garland, Gypsy Rose Lee, Roy Rogers, Dean Martin, Bob Hope, Jerry Lewis and Irv Kupcinet

The top floor, known as the Skyline Terrace Penthouse housed the Chicago Press Club from 1960 to 1978. The Chicago Press Club occupied this 22nd-floor space longer than any location in its history and during its residency it hosted to some of Chicago’s most famous newscasters. In 1980, Hotel St. Clair was renamed The Inn of Chicago after a $13 million renovation. Shell Hospitality Group reopened the hotel in February 1982 as part of the Best Western chain. In November 2006, the Chartres Lodging Group umbrella of hotels purchased the Inn of Chicago from Best Western for $40 million.

After the sale, the hotel underwent major renovations including a new lobby, new guest rooms, bathrooms, and a refurbished lobby and bar. The primary historic façade and trademark "Inn of Chicago" neon sign were restored. The restoration resulted in 359 guest rooms, six suites, and 5,800 square feet (540 m^{2}) of meeting space. The 22-story hotel was equipped with a fitness center, business center, innbar, and a street-level Lavazza café with outdoor seating area.

In late 2026, the hotel will undergo renovations, and will reopen in 2027 as Ruby Hotel Chicago, part of IHG Hotels & Resorts.

== Ownership/management ==
IOC Hotel, LLC, a joint venture between The Chartres Lodging Group of San Francisco and Longwing Real Estate Ventures, LLC, a member of the Dubai Investment Group purchased the Inn of Chicago. Kokua Hospitality LLC, a wholly owned subsidiary of The Chartres Lodging Group, LLC has managed the Inn of Chicago since its re-opening in 2006. The venture also operates The Doubletree Hotel Chicago Magnificent Mile, the Allerton Hotel in Chicago and the Aloft Washington National Harbor. In 2009, the Inn of Chicago became part of the Maryland-based Choice Hotels International and Ascend Collection chain of hotels.
