= Flight of Butterflies =

Public art initiative in Chicago, Illinois

The Flight of Butterflies is a public art initiative located throughout the Chicago Parks District and along the city's Magnificent Mile. The exhibit programming debuted in April 2024 and is set to run through September 2025. Organized by the Peggy Notebaert Nature Museum in collaboration with The Magnificent Mile Association and Special Service Area 76, the exhibit features 29 large butterfly sculptures designed by local artists and community groups. The six-foot-tall sculptures are crafted from steel with aluminum wings, modeled after butterfly species such as the eastern tiger swallowtail and the state-threatened regal fritillary.

Flight of Butterflies aims to raise awareness about biodiversity and conservation through art. The Peggy Notebaert Nature Museum, renowned for its Judy Istock Butterfly Haven, home to over 1,000 free-flying butterflies, draws inspiration from its commitment to conservation efforts. Each sculpture serves not only as a work of art but also as a call to action, encouraging viewers to consider their own role in conservation.

This city-wide exhibit initially featured sculptures along Michigan Avenue, with plans to later rotate the works to various locations throughout Chicago, including parks such as Garfield Park, Humboldt Park, and Lincoln Park. The initiative brings together a variety of partners, including CNL Projects, the Chicago Park District, and ChiLab Studio. Financial backing from Tullman Community Ventures further enabled the execution of the project.

== Exhibit features ==
The city-wide exhibit features 29 large butterfly sculptures placed in strategic locations across Chicago, including the Magnificent Mile, Jane M. Byrne Plaza, and various city parks such as Garfield Park, Humboldt Park, and Lincoln Park.

The six-foot-tall sculptures are designed by a diverse group of local artists and community groups, who modeled them after butterfly species like the eastern tiger swallowtail and the state-threatened regal fritillary. The sculptures are made from steel bases with cast metal bodies and aluminum wings, making them both visually striking and durable.

The exhibit is supported by the augmented reality (AR) butterfly experience. By scanning QR codes placed at each butterfly sculpture, users can activate the AR experience directly on their smartphones. This feature leverages the front-facing camera to superimpose virtual butterflies into the real-world environment.

== Magnificent Mile ==
The Flight of Butterflies exhibit on the Magnificent Mile features ten butterfly sculptures placed along Michigan Avenue, with specific spots including Pioneer Court, the Ritz-Carlton, and Water Tower Place. Other notable locations feature the sculptures, such as the planter bed at 625 North Michigan Avenue, where the piece "Map to Migration" by Rubén Aguirre is displayed, and Jane Byrne Park, which hosts a sculpture by the Englewood Arts Collective.

Each of the locations also offers an augmented reality experience. By scanning QR codes at the sculpture sites, visitors can watch virtual butterflies, native to Chicago, come alive on their screens. The QR codes also allow visitors to learn more about the artworks and their creators.

The exhibit ran through July 2024, with sculptures migrating to Lincoln Park and various city parks on the South and West sides later in the year.

=== Sculptures ===
- Vuelo Sobre Fronteras by Hector Duarte
- Wanderlust by Mayumi Lake
- Ulukububa by Nnenna Okore
- Boundless Impact by Englewood Arts Collective
- Adapting to an Unnatural Habitat: A Haiku by Cydney M. Lewis
- Turnasol/Iridescence by Salvador Andrade Arévalo
- Map to Migration by Rubén Aguirre
- Techno Organic by Rahmaan Statik
- Vuela Vuela by Yvette Mayorga
- Of Migratory Paths and Milkweed by Alice Hargrave

== Artists ==
Full list of participating artists

1. Alice Hargrave
2. Ariée (Aria Carter)
3. Azadeh Hussaini
4. Candace Hunter (chlee)
5. Cydney Lewis
6. Englewood Arts Collective
7. Hector Duarte
8. Isaac Couch
9. James Jankowiak
10. Jordan Martins
11. Kahari Blackburn
12. Leonard Suryajaya
13. Liz Flores
14. Luis De La Torre
15. Maria Burundarena
16. Marwen Lab Residency
17. Mayumi Lake
18. Melanie Vazquez
19. Moises Salazar Tlatenchi
20. Negwes White
21. Nnenna Okore
22. Olya Salimova
23. Rahmaan Statik
24. Ravi Arupa
25. Red Line Service
26. Rubén Aguirre
27. Salvador Andrade Arévalo
28. William Estrada
29. Yvette Mayorga

== Sponsors and partners ==
The initiative is spearheaded by The Magnificent Mile Association, in collaboration with the Peggy Notebaert Nature Museum and Special Service Area 76, a district that funds various public services and beautification projects. CNL Projects organized the artists and ChiLab Studio designed the cast metal bodies and provided support and space for the artists to work.

The Flight of Butterflies Exhibit in Chicago 2024 has garnered support from a variety of sponsors and partners dedicated to enriching the community through art and nature conservation. Key partners include Michael Dimitroff at the Chicago Park District, art consultant Cortney Lederer at CNL Projects, Ben Stagl at ChiLab Studio, who provided studio space and directed the sculptural forms fabrication for the exhibit., and Terry Karpowicz who handled installation. Financial support was also provided by Tullman Community Ventures, enabling the creation and execution of the exhibit
