= 900 North Michigan =

Skyscraper in Chicago, Illinois

900 North Michigan Avenue
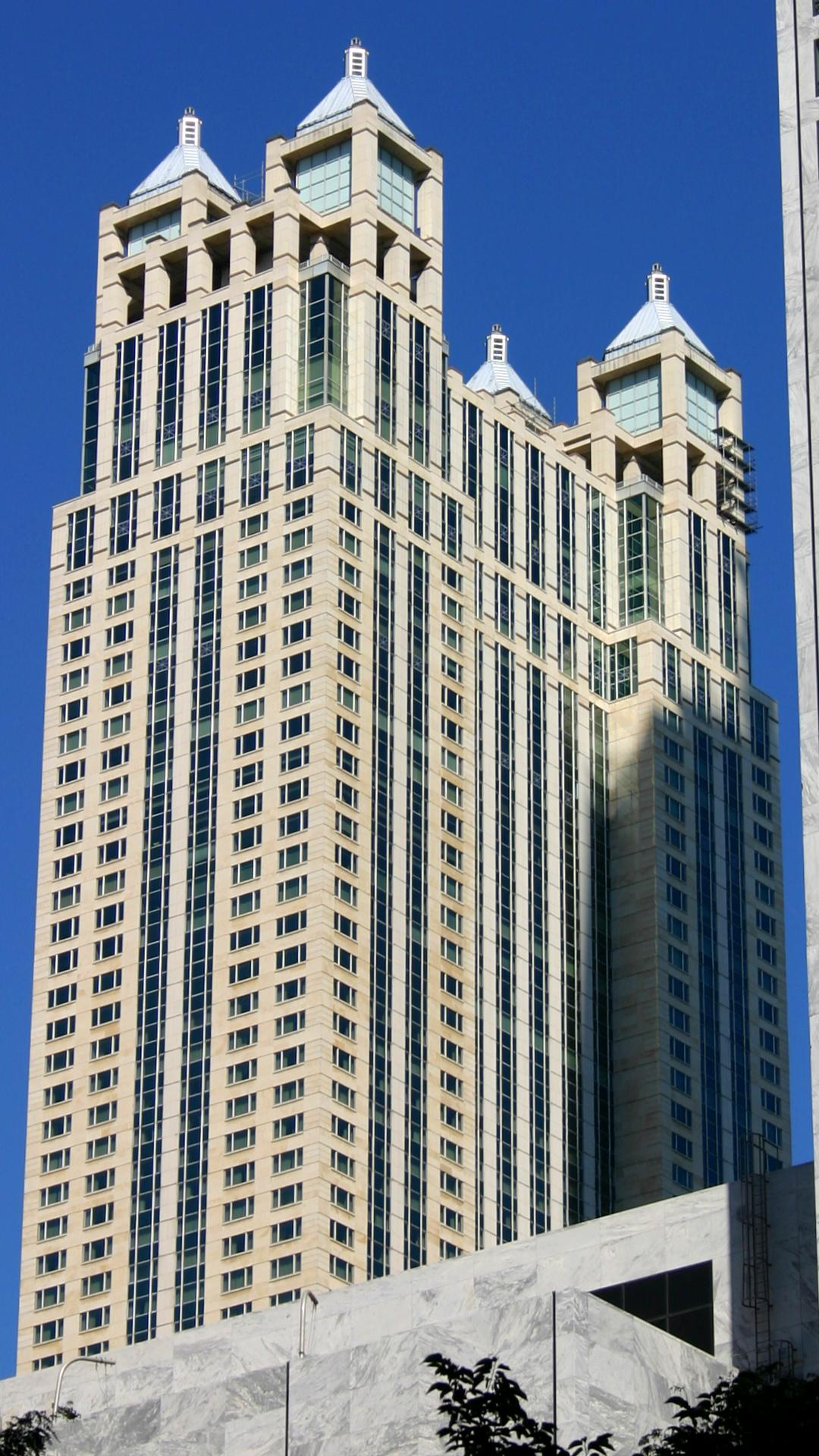

- Location within Chicago metropolitan area Location within Illinois Location within the United States

General information
- Type: Mixed
- Location: 900 North Michigan Avenue, Chicago, Illinois, United States
- Coordinates: 41°53′59″N 87°37′30″W
- Completed: 1988

Height
- Roof: 871 ft (265 m)

Technical details
- Floor count: 66

Design and construction
- Architects: Kohn Pedersen Fox; HKS, Inc.
- Developer: Urban Retail Properties
- Main contractor: J.A. Jones Construction

Other information
- Public transit: CTA; Red at Chicago

900 North Michigan is a skyscraper in Chicago, Illinois, U.S., completed in 1989. At 871 feet (265 m) tall, it is the eleventh tallest building in Chicago as of 2023 and the 59th-tallest in the United States. It was developed by Urban Retail Properties in 1988 as an upscale sister to Water Tower Place, one block southeast, and was the second vertical mall built along the Magnificent Mile.

The building features a large, upscale shopping mall called 900 North Michigan Shops. Bloomingdale's occupies the rear of its wide, six-story atrium, with other luxury shops and restaurants filling the remaining spaces. For this reason, it is commonly referred to as the "Bloomingdale's Building". The mall opened with Henri Bendel as a "junior anchor," since closed. The layout of the retail area reflects lessons learned from Water Tower Place; the anchor's placement at the rear draws shoppers through the space and creates leasable space with valuable Michigan Avenue frontage, while the arrangement of escalators in parallel, rather than in zig-zags, directs foot traffic past more shops.

Offices originally occupied floors 8–28. However, floors 21–28 were converted to condo units in 2007; this left offices on floors 8–20. The luxurious Four Seasons Hotel occupies the middle floors (30–46) of the tower. Floors 48–66 are part of the 132 East Delaware Residences; these 106 condominiums were part of the original building plan. A large 12-story parking garage, with retail on the ground level and a medical clinic atop, occupies the rear half of the block, facing Rush Street.

The exterior of the tower is clad in limestone and green glass which reflects the light. The building has a steel skeleton on which a concrete frame was erected for the upper floors. Because the building materials changed, cranes used to work on the lower floors could not be used for the concrete portion and new cranes had to be erected to complete the building. Four lit "lanterns" atop the structure give it a distinctive skyline presence. They change colors for the Christmas season.

== Office tenants ==
- Four Seasons Hotels and Resorts Worldwide Sales Office
- Berkshire Hathaway
- BW Capital Partners
- Edgewater Funds
- Grosvenor Capital Management
- JHL Capital Group
- JMB Financial Advisors
- JMB Insurance
- JMB Realty
- Pircher, Nichols & Meeks
- Rush Street Gaming
- Walton Street Capital

== Hotel and retail tenants ==
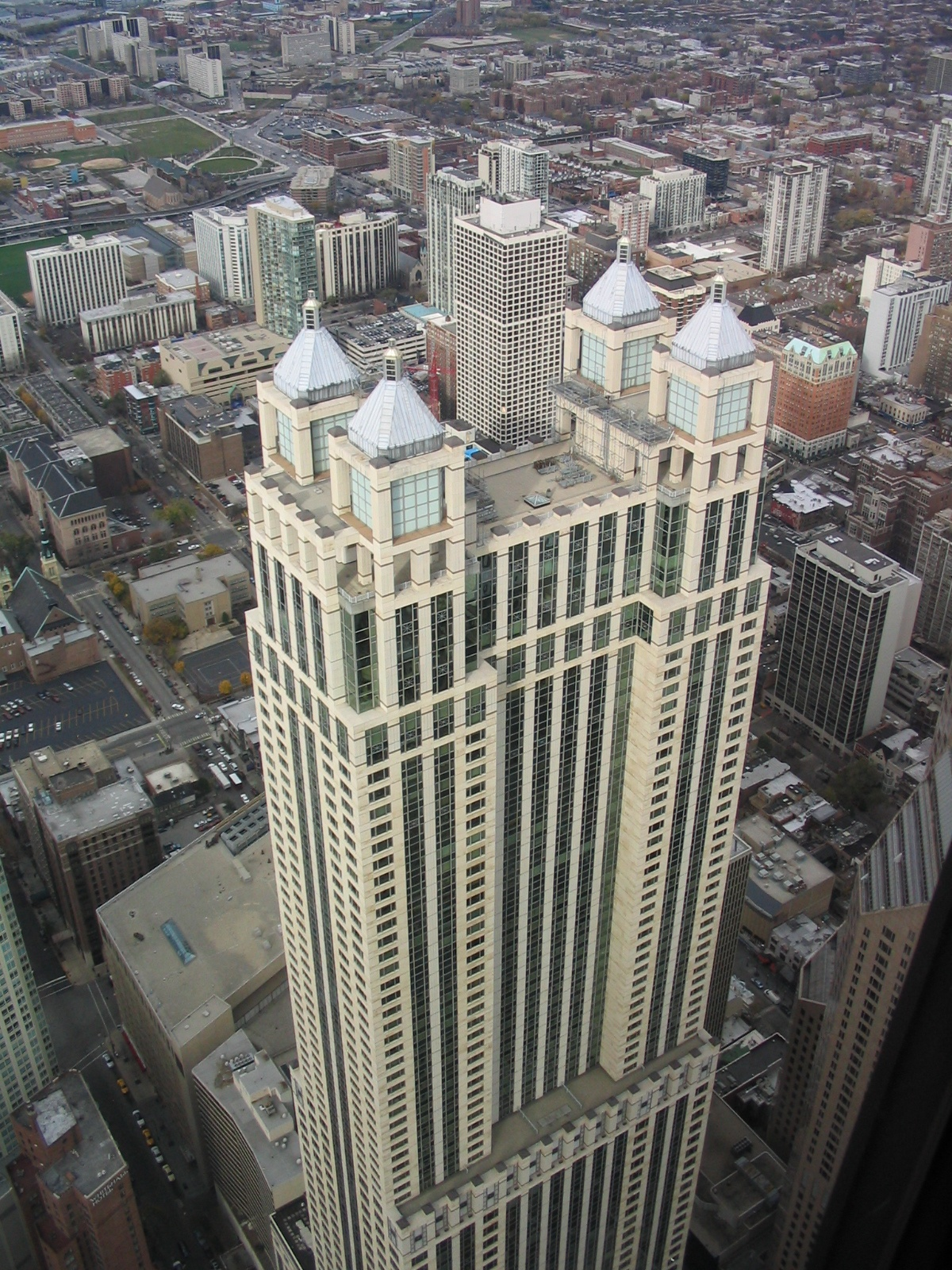
View from John Hancock Center

Retailers at the 900 Shops include:

- Four Seasons Hotel Chicago
- Bloomingdales
- Equinox Fitness
- Mario Tricoci
- Gucci
- Club Monaco
- Lululemon Athletica
- Kate Spade
- Bellina Caetano
- Enchante
- Bonobos
- Rigby & Peller
- Atlas Galleries
- Azeeza
- Crosell & Co.
- Kate Spade New York
- Sur La Table
- MaxMara
- Mini Me
- L’Agence

== Position in Chicago's skyline ==
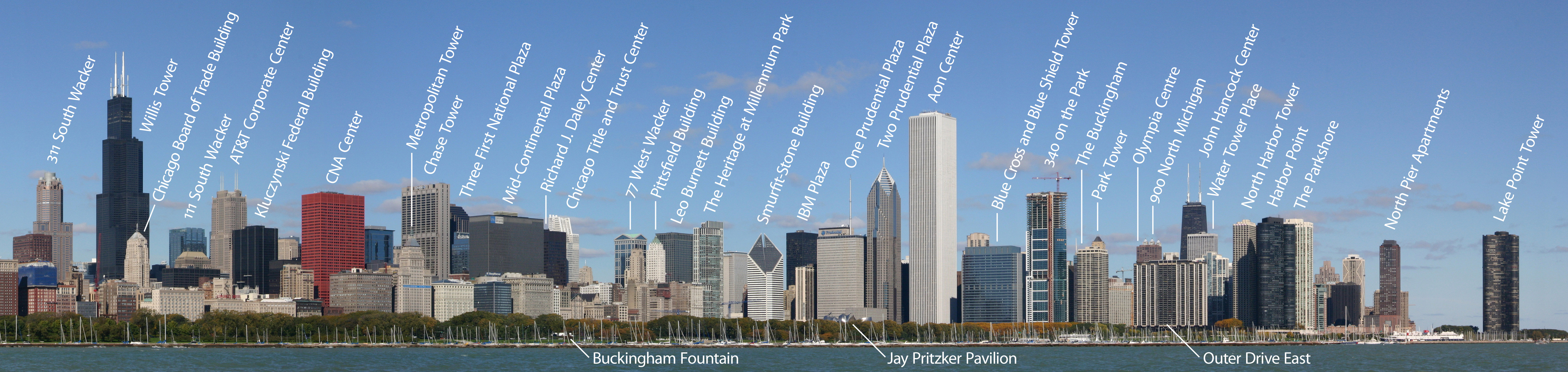

== See also ==
- List of buildings
- List of skyscrapers
- List of tallest buildings in Chicago
- List of tallest buildings in the United States
- World's tallest structures
