= The Shops at North Bridge =

Coordinates: 41.89140°N 87.62479°W

- Location: Chicago, Illinois, USA
- Opened: 2000
- Developer: The John Buck Co.
- Manager: Centennial
- Owner: Centennial
- Num. of stores: 43
- Num. of anchor tenants: 1
- Floor area: 678,000 sq ft (63,000 m^{2})
- Floors: 5 (including ground level retail)
- Public transit: Chicago "L": Red Line at Grand
- Website: northbridgechicago.com

The Shops at North Bridge, once known as Westfield North Bridge, is an upscale, urban retail-entertainment district in Chicago, Illinois, located at 520 N. Michigan Avenue. Its anchor store is Nordstrom. Its name alludes first to its location within the nine-block North Bridge complex and to the literal distinction of the shopping center incorporating four-level enclosed bridges over both east Grand Ave, and north Rush Street.

North Bridge also includes five hotels (three Hilton, two Marriott), three parking garages, and two office buildings, housing the American Medical Association and Euro RSCG. Upon opening, it also included a DisneyQuest "urban amusement park," since converted into a furniture store.

In 2003, The Westfield Group acquired the shopping center, and renamed it "Westfield Shoppingtown North Bridge," dropping the "Shoppingtown" name in June 2005.

However, The Macerich Company acquired the mall in January 2008, returning to the mall's original name, "The Shops at North Bridge." It was Macerich's first mall in Illinois.

In December 2024, the owner of The Shops at North Bridge, the Alaska Permanent Fund, surrendered the retail property to its lender. The move was indicative of the fall in property values in Chicago's Magnificent Mile, as retail failed to recover following the COVID-19 pandemic.

== Architecture and art ==
The shopping mall occupies the lower floors of an unusual building. The Art Deco McGraw-Hill Building, built in 1928 and a designated City of Chicago historic landmark, was demolished but its facade dismantled, cleaned, stored, and re-hung on the exterior of a new building on the same site. The Conrad Hotel, a luxury affiliate of Hilton Hotels, occupied the upper floors of the building, until it was renamed the Gwen in 2015. The hotel opened under the Le Meridien flag and was converted in 2006. The mall also occupies a topographically unusual site, as Michigan Avenue at this location is elevated, gently sloping back down to ground level from its bi-level bridge over the Chicago River. Furthermore, Nordstrom occupies floors one through four of a full-block building one block behind Michigan Avenue, at the southwest corner of N. Rush Street and E. Grand Avenue. The only location available for a prominent entry on Michigan Avenue was over Grand Avenue, where the developer built an 80-foot-tall (24 m) atrium between the former McGraw-Hill Building and the existing Marriott Hotel. The mall curves southwest through the building and ramps up several feet, accommodating a rise in Grand Avenue below, then spans Rush Street to meet Nordstrom. Under development agreements, no leasable retail space occupies the actual bridges. Street-level retail space also exists along the ground-level streets underneath the mall, whose first floor is actually quite high above ground level. The complex's architects were Anthony Belluschi Associates, with OWP&P, Kellermeyer Godfryt Hart PC (Preservation Consultant), Farr and Associates (City of Chicago preservation consultant), and Callison (Nordstrom building). The McGraw-Hill Building's original architect was Thielbar and Fugard.

Two other structures within the North Bridge complex are architecturally notable. The construction of the AMC Loews 600 North Michigan building also created controversy, as it included the demolition of the Arts Club of Chicago (interior by Mies van der Rohe, 1951), a private art gallery. Construction proceeded after the Arts Club relocated its famed floating staircase to a new building. North Bridge's oldest building is the American Medical Association office building at 515 N. State Street, the first American building designed by architect Kenzō Tange (in 1990).
