= Don McNeill (radio presenter) =

American radio personality (1907–1996)

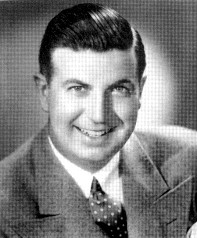
- McNeill in a 1942 publicity photo
- Born: Donald T. McNeill; December 23, 1907; Galena, Illinois, U.S.
- Died: May 7, 1996 (aged 88); Evanston, Illinois, U.S.
- Resting place: All Saints Cemetery, Des Plaines, Illinois, U.S.
- Occupation: Radio personality

Donald T. McNeill (December 23, 1907 – May 7, 1996) was an American radio personality, best known as the creator and host of The Breakfast Club, which ran for more than 35 years.

== Early career ==
McNeill was born in Galena, Illinois, son of Harry T. McNeill and Luella R. Weinberger. The family soon moved to Sheboygan, Wisconsin, and he later graduated from Marquette University 50 miles (80 km) to the south in Milwaukee. He was a first cousin of United States Secretary of Defense Caspar Weinberger; McNeill's mother was the elder sister of Weinberger's father.

McNeill began his radio career in Milwaukee in 1928, first as a script editor and announcer at The Milwaukee Sentinel's WISN, and later working for crosstown competitor WTMJ, owned by Sentinel rival The Milwaukee Journal. McNeill moved on to Kentucky, working for the Louisville Courier-Journal's station, WHAS. This was followed by working in San Francisco as a comedy act with singer Van Fleming, called "The Two Professors". After a failed career move to New York City, McNeill returned to Illinois in 1933.

== The Breakfast Club ==
McNeill applied for a job at NBC and was sent to Chicago to audition. He was assigned to host an unsponsored early morning variety show called The Pepper Pot, which had an 8 AM time slot on the NBC Blue Network (later to become ABC radio). McNeill re-organized the hour show as The Breakfast Club, dividing it into four segments he called "the four calls to breakfast". The show premiered on June 23, 1933, with informal talk and jokes based on topical events, and often included audience interviews. Each show started with the announcement "Coming to you from high atop the Hotel Allerton in downtown Chicago, it's The Breakfast Club, with your host Don McNeill" followed by brief live audience applause. In its final form, the show featured piano music and vocal groups and soloists, with recurring comedy performers. McNeil gained a sponsor, Swift and Company. McNeill is credited as the first performer to make morning talk and variety a viable format in radio.

Archie Bleyer, who led the band for Arthur Godfrey's daily Arthur Godfrey Time on CBS radio, had founded Cadence Records in 1953. That year, Bleyer traveled to Chicago to record some patriotic spoken word recordings by McNeill. Although Breakfast Club ratings were below Godfrey's, the latter took umbrage that Bleyer had taken time off from the Godfrey show to record McNeill, who Godfrey considered a competitor despite the fact Godfrey's shows had far broader appeal. In October 1953, on the same day Godfrey fired singer Julius LaRosa on the air, Godfrey privately dismissed Bleyer for recording McNeill.

McNeill attempted to transfer the show to television as Don McNeill's TV Club (1950–1951). The Breakfast Club was simulcast on television in 1954–1955. McNeill appeared occasionally on game shows, and in 1963 hosted a short-lived game show Take Two, built around photo comparisons. McNeill's radio series finally ended in 1968, when McNeill retired from entertainment and public life.

== Later years ==
After his radio career ended, McNeill taught communication arts classes at Marquette and Notre Dame from 1970 to 1972, represented the Deltona Corporation, Florida land developers, from 1970 to 1980, and served as a director of the Sears Foundation and on the advisory boards of Notre Dame, Marquette and Loyola University of Chicago.

== Death ==
McNeill died at Evanston Hospital in Evanston, Illinois, in 1996, aged 88.

== Legacy ==
McNeill's Breakfast Club was inducted into the Radio Hall of Fame in 1989.
