= Chicago Place =

Building in Chicago, Illinois

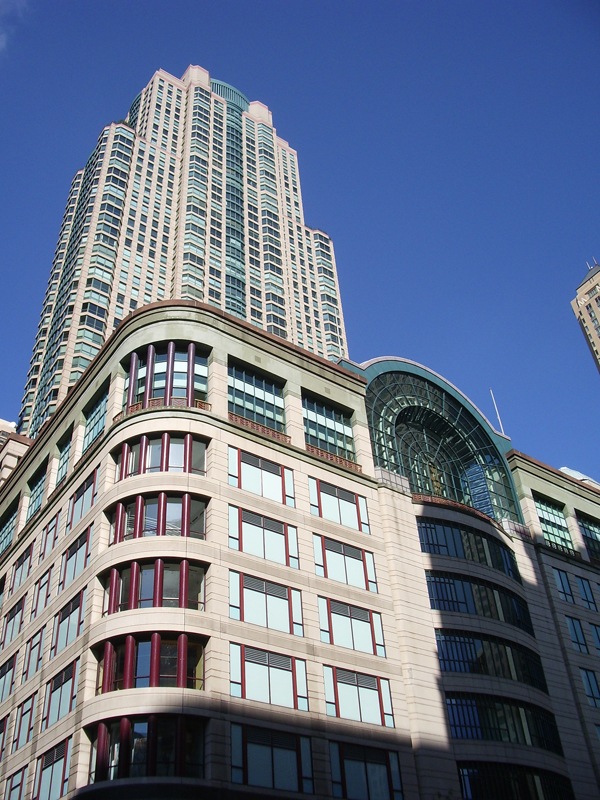
- Interactive map of the Chicago Place area

General information
- Status: Completed
- Location: Chicago, Illinois, United States
- Coordinates: 41.8953°N 87.6247°W
- Completed: 1991

Height
- Roof: 608 ft (185 m)

Technical details
- Floor count: 49

Design and construction
- Architects: Skidmore, Owings and Merrill (mall portion); Solomon Cordwell Buenz (tower portion)

Other information
- Public transit: CTA; Red at Chicago

Chicago Place is a mixed-use high-rise on the 700 block of North Michigan Avenue (between Huron and Superior) in Chicago along the Magnificent Mile, completed in 1991. The lower levels originally contained a vertical mall anchored by Saks Fifth Avenue. Above that, is a tower containing condominiums.

By 2009, the mall portion had closed and largely been abandoned, with only the Saks store remaining. The abandoned mall has frequently been the site of "urban exploration" videos posted online. The Saks anchor store closed on May 16, 2026.

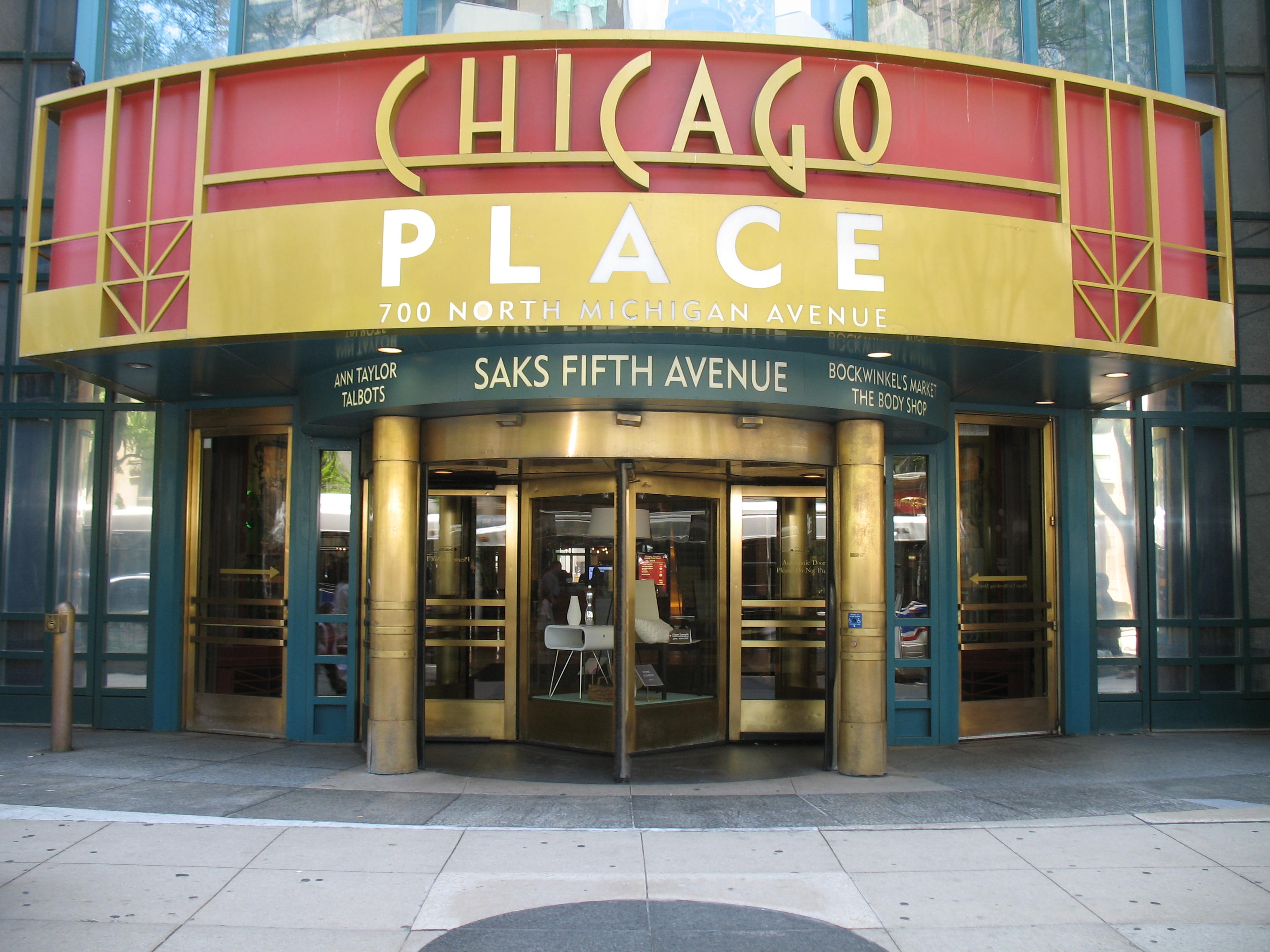
Chicago Place entrance on the Magnificent Mile

== See also ==
- Chicago architecture
- 50 tallest buildings in the U.S.
- List of tallest buildings in Chicago
- List of towers
- World's tallest structures
