= Dick Noel =

American singer

Richard Noel (May 30, 1927, Brooklyn, New York – October 20, 2017, Escondido, California), known professionally as Dick Noel, was an American band vocalist, jingle singer, and radio and television performer.

== Recordings ==
Noel toured and recorded with the Ray Anthony Orchestra during the late 1940s, including on the hit "Count Every Star" in 1950. From 1952 through 1954 he recorded a series of singles for Decca Records, and from 1954 through 1962 his singles were released on the Cincinnati, Ohio based Fraternity label. His solo singles featured backing by Dan Belloc And His Orchestra, Dorrance Stalvey And His Orchestra, Lew Douglas And His Orchestra, and he also led vocal groups that provided backing for other soloists under the names The Chicago Group and The Dick Noel Singers.

In 1978 he recorded and released the album A Time for Love in collaboration with pianist Larry Novak. His album My Serious Side came out in 1985.

== Radio and television ==
During the 1950s and early 1960s Noel was featured as a soloist on a number of radio shows. He sang regularly on The Ruth Lyons Show in Cincinnati and then joined Don McNeill's Breakfast Club in Chicago, where he was the lead singer for many years.

His first television appearance was on Arthur Godfrey's Talent Scouts, and from 1962 to 1965 he was a featured singer on Tennessee Ernie Ford Show on the ABC Television Network.

== Jingles and voiceover work ==
Noel began a second career as a jingle singer in 1965. In this latter pursuit, he was christened "The King of the Jingles," recording an estimated 15,000 spots, including national jingles for McDonald's and United Airlines.

He retired to San Diego in the late 1980s, where he continued creating albums and working as a voiceover artist, including such projects as Silicon Beach Software's Dark Castle in 1986.

== Personal life ==
Noel was born in Brooklyn, New York. He served in the Coast Guard during World War II, and took up a career as a singer after returning to civilian life. When he died at the age of 90 in 2017, he was survived by his wife to whom he had been married since 1979, two children, and three step-children. He was preceded in death by his son.
