= Perkins, Fellows & Hamilton Office and Studio =

Coordinates: 41°53′49.9″N 87°37′30.3″W

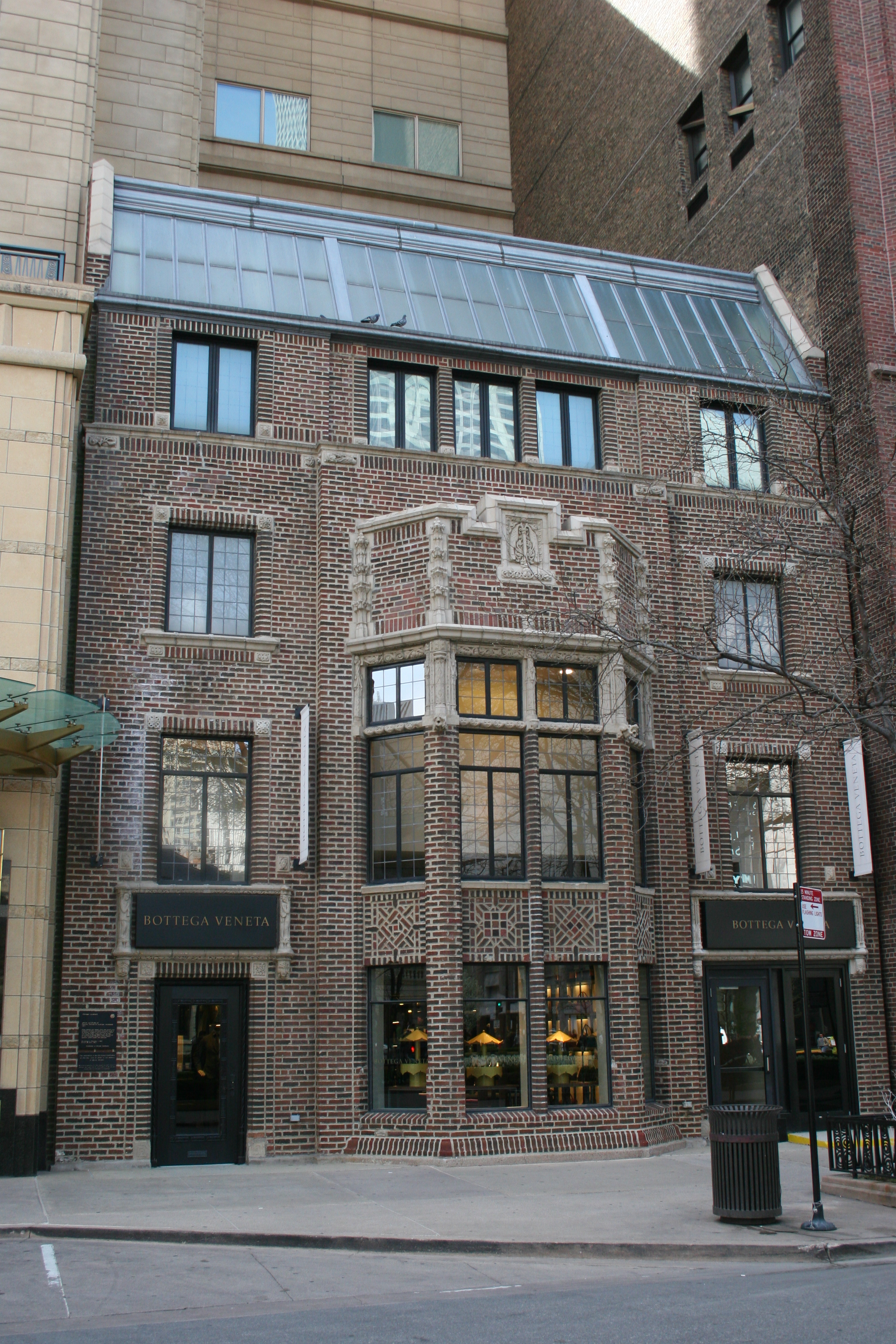
Perkins, Fellows & Hamilton Office and Studio on Tower Ct

Perkins, Fellows & Hamilton Office and Studio is a brick and stone building located along the Magnificent Mile in the Near North Side community area of Chicago, Illinois. It was named a Chicago Landmark on December 1, 1993.
