= Don McNeill's Breakfast Club =

American network radio breakfast program (1933–1968)

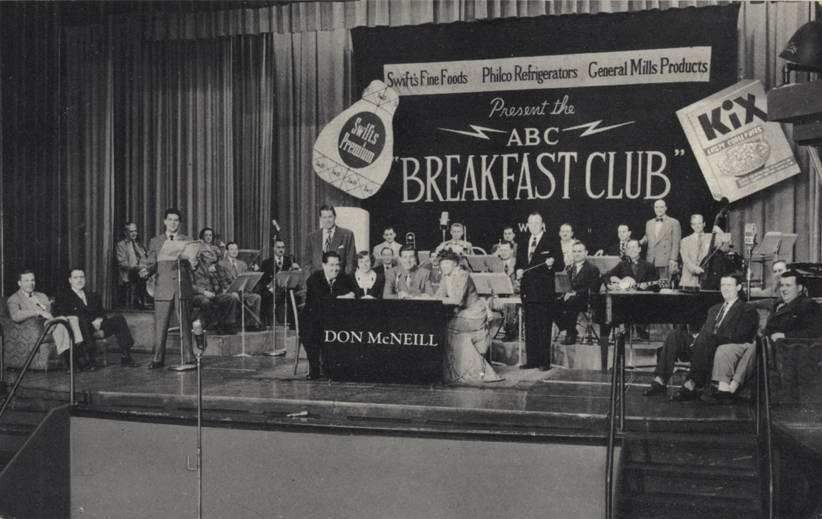
"Breakfast Club" in 1950.

Don McNeill's Breakfast Club is a long-running morning variety show on NBC Blue Network/ABC radio (and briefly on television) originating in Chicago, Illinois. Hosted by Don McNeill, the radio program ran from June 23, 1933, through December 27, 1968. McNeil's 35 1/2-year run as host remains the longest tenure for an emcee of a network entertainment program, greater than Johnny Carson (29 1/2 years) on The Tonight Show and Bob Barker (34 2/3 years) on The Price Is Right, albeit split between radio and television, whereas Carson and Barker were on television only.

== History ==
In Chicago during the early 1930s, McNeill was assigned to take over an unsponsored early morning variety show, The Pepper Pot, with an 8 a.m. timeslot on the NBC Blue Network. McNeill re-organized the hour as The Breakfast Club, dividing it into four segments which McNeill labeled "the Four Calls to Breakfast".

McNeill's revamped show premiered in 1933, combining music with informal talk and jokes often based on topical events, initially scripted by McNeill but later ad-libbed. The series eventually gained a sponsor in the Chicago-based meat packer Swift and Company, beginning February 8, 1941. McNeill is credited as the first performer to make morning talk and variety a viable radio format.

== Format and performers ==
The show's structure was tightly formatted to fit the needs of its audience, who could wake up and eat breakfast while it was on, and then leave for work or school. Every quarter-hour came the "Call to Breakfast" — including the popular "march around the breakfast table," a rousing band march. In addition to comedy performances, vocal groups and soloists, and instrumental dance music, regular segments included inspirational verse, conversations with members of the studio audience, and a moment of silent prayer. There was often a "trip down memory lane," as audience members recalled their decades-earlier encounters with the show, such as being born while it was on the air, or knitting socks for Don McNeill's baby when he announced the birth on-air. Riddles and jokes were submitted and performed by audience members, shout-outs were made to the home towns of those in attendance and brief interviews were conducted with groups of high school students and members of clubs and trade organizations who were visiting Chicago.

The program showcased many musicians and comedians, including Fran Allison (later of Kukla, Fran and Ollie fame) as "Aunt Fanny", plus Captain Stubby and the Buccaneers, and comedy bits by Sam Cowling. Guests included Bob Hope, Emmett Kelly, Ilka Chase, Warren Hull, Jim and Marian Jordan of Fibber McGee and Molly, the Anita Kerr Singers, Jimmy Stewart, Lucille Ball, Jerry Lewis, and Charlie Applewhite, with Ted Mack as a guest host. Featured vocalists on the show included Dick Noel, Anita Bryant, Cathie Taylor, and, under her professional name of Annette King, Charlotte Thompson Reid, who later became an Illinois congresswoman for five terms (1962–71). Eileen Parker was a regular vocalist with the program in 1953.

== Broadcast venues and networks ==
=== Radio ===
The Breakfast Club initially was broadcast from the NBC studios in the Merchandise Mart. In 1948, after 4,500 broadcasts from the Merchandise Mart, the program moved to the new ABC Civic Studio. It was also heard from other Chicago venues: the Terrace Casino (at the Morrison Hotel), the College Inn Porterhouse (at the Sherman House) and the Cloud Room of the Warwick Allerton Hotel on Chicago's Magnificent Mile," as well as tour broadcasts from other locations in the U.S. It remained a fixture on the ABC radio network (formerly the NBC Blue Network; it became known as ABC in 1945), maintaining its popularity for years and counting among its fans Supreme Court Associate Justice William O. Douglas.

After ABC Radio was split into four networks in 1968, The Breakfast Club was moved to the new American Entertainment network, and was known for its last months on the air as The Don McNeill Show.

=== Television ===
On May 12, 1948, the program was "simulcast" with the ABC radio show as an experimental broadcast. The show, which originated that day from the Academy of Music in Philadelphia, was televised on several participating East Coast television stations, stretching up from the ABC television station WMAL-TV in Washington, D.C. to the DuMont television station WABD in New York. Sponsor Philco promoted this special television event by running newspaper advertisements which invited fans in the participating cities to view the show at a local Philco dealership.

Beginning on September 13, 1950, the show aired as TV Club (aka Don McNeill's TV Club) on ABC in the 1950-51 prime time season in a 60-minute version, Wednesdays at 9p.m. ET. From September to December 1951, the show returned to ABC in a 30-minute version, Wednesdays from 9pm to 9:30pm ET.

Beginning on February 22, 1954, and ending on February 25, 1955, Don McNeill's Breakfast Club was simulcast in its regular morning slot on ABC Radio and ABC Television. At least two kinescope recordings survive of these telecasts, including a February 17, 1954 "test kinescope," produced a week before the regular ABC simulcasts began. However, the show failed to make a successful transition to television in either version.

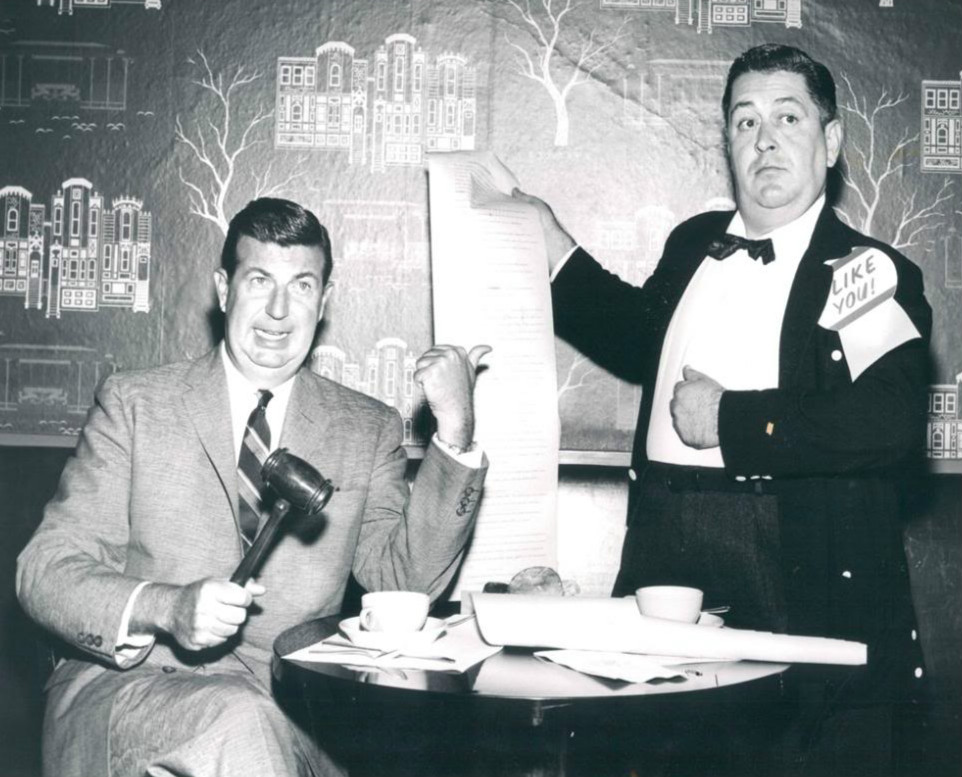
McNeill with comedian Sam Cowling on a broadcast remote from San Francisco, 1956.

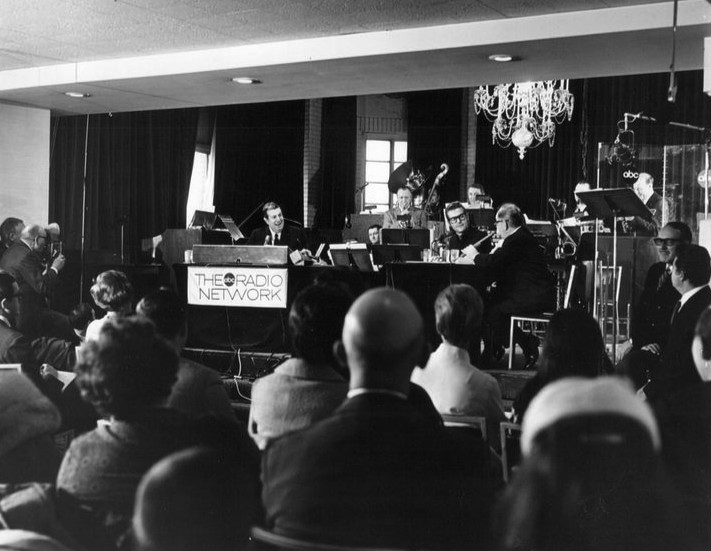
The last broadcast of the Breakfast Club. The program was taped on December 20, 1968, at the Allerton Hotel and aired on December 27.

== Book ==
John Doolittle's book about this program, Don McNeill and His Breakfast Club (University of Notre Dame Press, 2001), was reviewed by Susan M. Colowick in Library Journal:

Before Garrison was even a twinkle in Mr. Keillor's eye, Don McNeill launched a radio show with a unique mix of humor, music and audience participation. From 1933 to 1968, the Chicago-based Breakfast Club aired every weekday on the ABC radio network (originally NBC's Blue Network). Millions of Americans tuned in to hear songs, jokes, interviews, the "March Around the Breakfast Table," the "Moment of Silent Prayer" and other regular features. (Except for his strong support of public prayer, McNeill eschewed politics, though he did run for president in 1948 on the Laugh Party ticket.) In this thoroughly researched and highly readable account, Doolittle reminds us just how popular Breakfast Club really was, especially with homemakers of modest means but also with the likes of J. Edgar Hoover and Justice William O. Douglas. Many show business celebrities were guests on the show, including Jimmy Stewart, Lucille Ball and Jerry Lewis. The book is accompanied by a CD that features clips from actual shows.

== See also ==
- 1950-51 United States network television schedule
- 1951-52 United States network television schedule

== Bibliography ==
- John Doolittle, Don McNeill and His Breakfast Club University of Notre Dame Press, 2001),
- David Weinstein, The Forgotten Network: DuMont and the Birth of American Television (Philadelphia: Temple University Press, 2004) ISBN 1-59213-245-6
- Alex McNeil, Total Television, Fourth edition (New York: Penguin Books, 1980) ISBN 0-14-024916-8
- Tim Brooks and Earle Marsh, The Complete Directory to Prime Time Network TV Shows, Third edition (New York: Ballantine Books, 1964) ISBN 0-345-31864-1
- Dunning, John. On the Air: The Encyclopedia of Old-Time Radio. Oxford University Press, 1998. ISBN 0-19-507678-8

== Listen to ==
- The Breakfast Club on December 8, 1941 (interrupted by war bulletins)
- Rich Samuels' tribute to The Breakfast Club (February 2004)
