= Four Seasons Hotel Chicago =

Hotel in Chicago, Illinois

Four Seasons Chicago
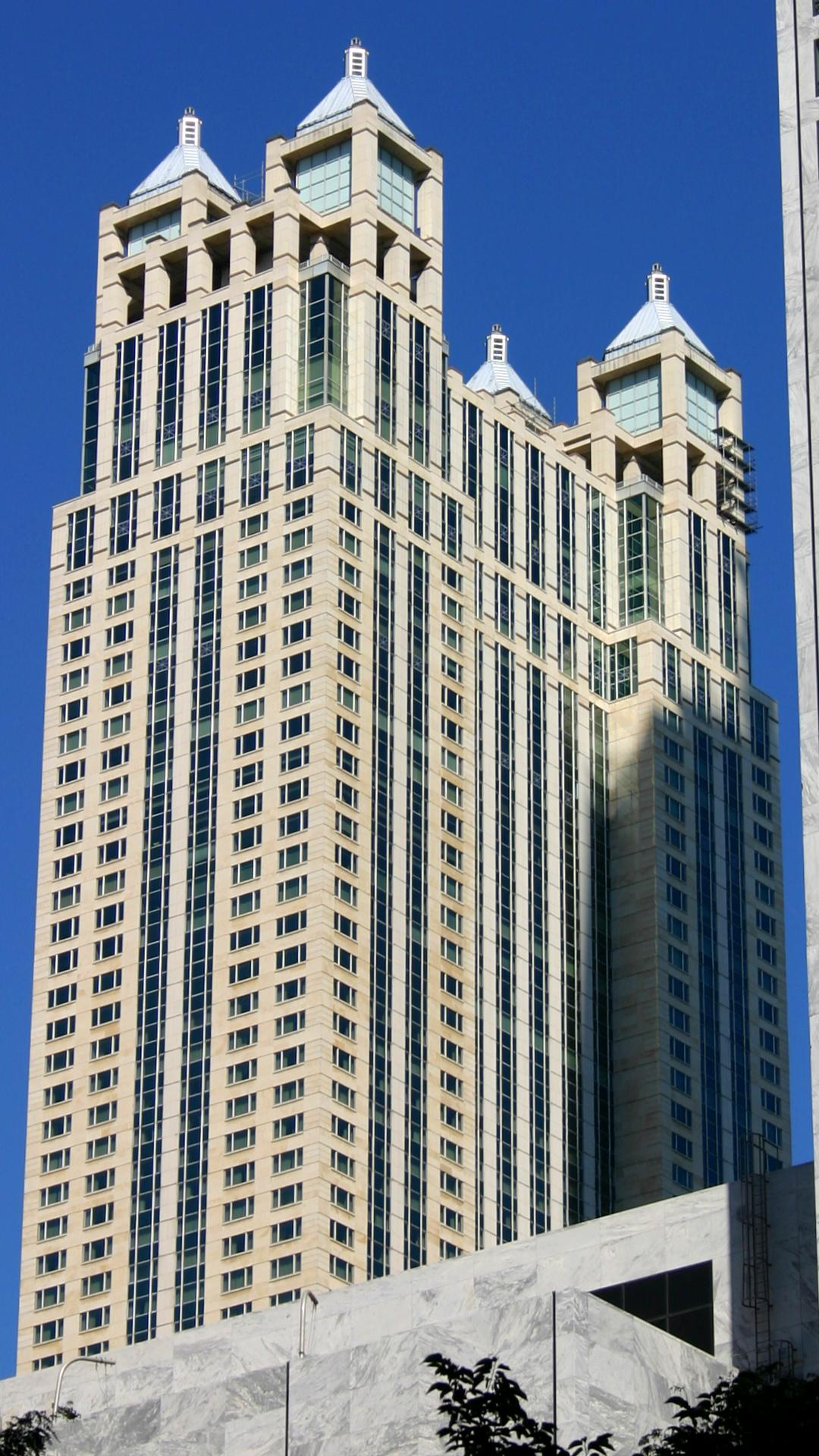

- Location within Chicago

General information
- Location: 120 East Delaware Place; Chicago, Illinois
- Coordinates: 41°53′59″N 87°37′30″W
- Opening: March 1989
- Owner: Four Seasons Hotels and Resorts

Technical details
- Floor count: 46 (including other floors)

Other information
- Number of rooms: 345
- Number of suites: 156
- Number of restaurants: 1

Website
- www.fourseasons.com/chicagofs

Four Seasons Hotel Chicago is a hotel in Chicago, Illinois, United States. Opened in 1989, it is part of Toronto-based Four Seasons Hotels and Resorts. The 345-room hotel occupies the 30th through 46th floors of the 900 North Michigan building on the Magnificent Mile overlooking Lake Michigan.

== Rating ==
Four Seasons Hotel Chicago has been receiving the AAA Five Diamond Award since 1990. It was ranked No. 5 in the U.S. News & World Report's 2019 list for the best hotels in the U.S., jumping from No. 12 in 2018. It has been receiving a Forbes Travel Guide (formerly Mobil Guide) 5-Star rating since 1996.

== Filming location ==
The pool scene in Home Alone 2: Lost in New York, set in New York City, was filmed here.
