= Mario Tricoci =

Italian-born American hairstylist and salon entrepreneur

- Born: Italy
- Occupations: Owner of Mario Tricoci Salon and Spas, Tricoci University of Beauty Culture, Fashion Judge, Beauty Educator, Hairstylist
- Known for: Mario Tricoci Salon and Spas, Fashion Education

Mario Tricoci is a hairstylist and owner of salons in Chicago, Illinois.

== Background ==
Mario Tricoci grew up in Cosenza, Italy. He, along with his wife, Cheryl, now runs the Chicago-based Tricoci Salon & Spa.

== Career ==
=== Early years ===
Mario Tricoci's interest in hair started when he was in his youth. As a young adult, Tricoci worked as an apprentice at the local salon in Italy. When Tricoci came to Chicago in the late 1950s as a teenager, he got his first job at John Edward's, a salon on Michigan Avenue. Since that point, Tricoci has been in business, and he is known for starting his career in 1960. Soon, Tricoci's talent in the cosmetology industry was recognized, and in 1966, Tricoci won Best Hairdresser at what is now the American Beauty Show. In 1967, Tricoci again won a major award, the Grand World Supreme, for fashion. Following this success, Mario, along with his brother, decided to start their own salons. In the 1970s, Tricoci and his brother, Franco, began salons in the Villa Park and Des Plaines area in Illinois. Thirty-five years later, the Mario Tricoci Hair Salons & Day Spas, are still successful.

=== Hair Salons & Day Spas ===
Today, Mario Tricoci owns 13 Hair Salons & day spas in Chicago. With over 1,400 employees, Tricoci is the overseer of the company. Tricoci claims that 92% of salons fail in the first two years, and he is proud that 35 years later, his salons are still running strong. His Arlington Heights location is famous for being the first salon and day spa in the Midwest area.

Mario Tricoci's Hair Salons & Day Spas are a known place in Chicago to receive beauty services.

=== Tricoci University of Beauty Culture ===
He opened the first Tricoci University in 2004 which has grown to a total of 16 universities today. These universities are founded on teaching students how to be professionals in the beauty world. They teach about professionalism, being ethical, and teach cosmetology and aesthetics.

=== The Fashion World ===
With Tricoci's beauty expertise, he has worked as a judge and on the board of directors for America's Beauty Show. This show could be considered one of Tricoci's major accomplishments. Each year, this show brings $60.2 million and 60,000 visitors to the Chicago area. Being on this board, Tricoci helps regulate what requirements are necessary to obtain a cosmetology license, and he also educates students and professionals on styles and techniques in the Chicago fashion industry. Tricoci also won the Gold Award from America's Beauty Show in 2003. In 2006, Tricoci won the International Legends Award for fashion and cosmetology.

Though Tricoci has a very European style, Tricoci claims that one of the groups of people he takes inspiration from is teenagers, because they are among the first groups to try, and change, fashion. Tricoci takes working with young adults a step further, and he puts on "Mario, Make Me a Model." During this competition, hundreds of models show up to win the award of being crowned a Mario Tricoci model, working with Mario Tricoci himself, and attending rigorous modeling and makeover sessions. At the very end of the competition, Mario Tricoci decides which model will win the contract with Factor, a modeling agency.

Tricoci has also paired up with Vitaminwater in the past, and they have sponsored InspireDesign, a Chicago fashion show. It took place in Millennium Park in Chicago, and it was the conclusion to "Mario, Make Me a Model."

Respected by his peers among the hairdressing elite, Mario has served as a member of the Board of Directors of Intercoiffure America/Canada. He is currently a member of the Board of Directors of Intercoiffure Mondia (worldwide organization), which is headquartered in Switzerland and Paris, and he is also a member of the Cosmetologists Chicago Association.

== In the News ==
Over the years, Tricoci and his work has been featured in many publications and has appeared on Oprah, Jenny Jones, Chicago network news and radio. Mario Tricoci was twice recognized as "Entrepreneur of the Year" by INC. Magazine. Mario Tricoci has appeared on ABC 7 News for his "Cuts for a Cause" fundraiser.
