= Magnificent Mile =

Section of Michigan Avenue in Chicago

- Neighborhood and street
- Magnificent Mile
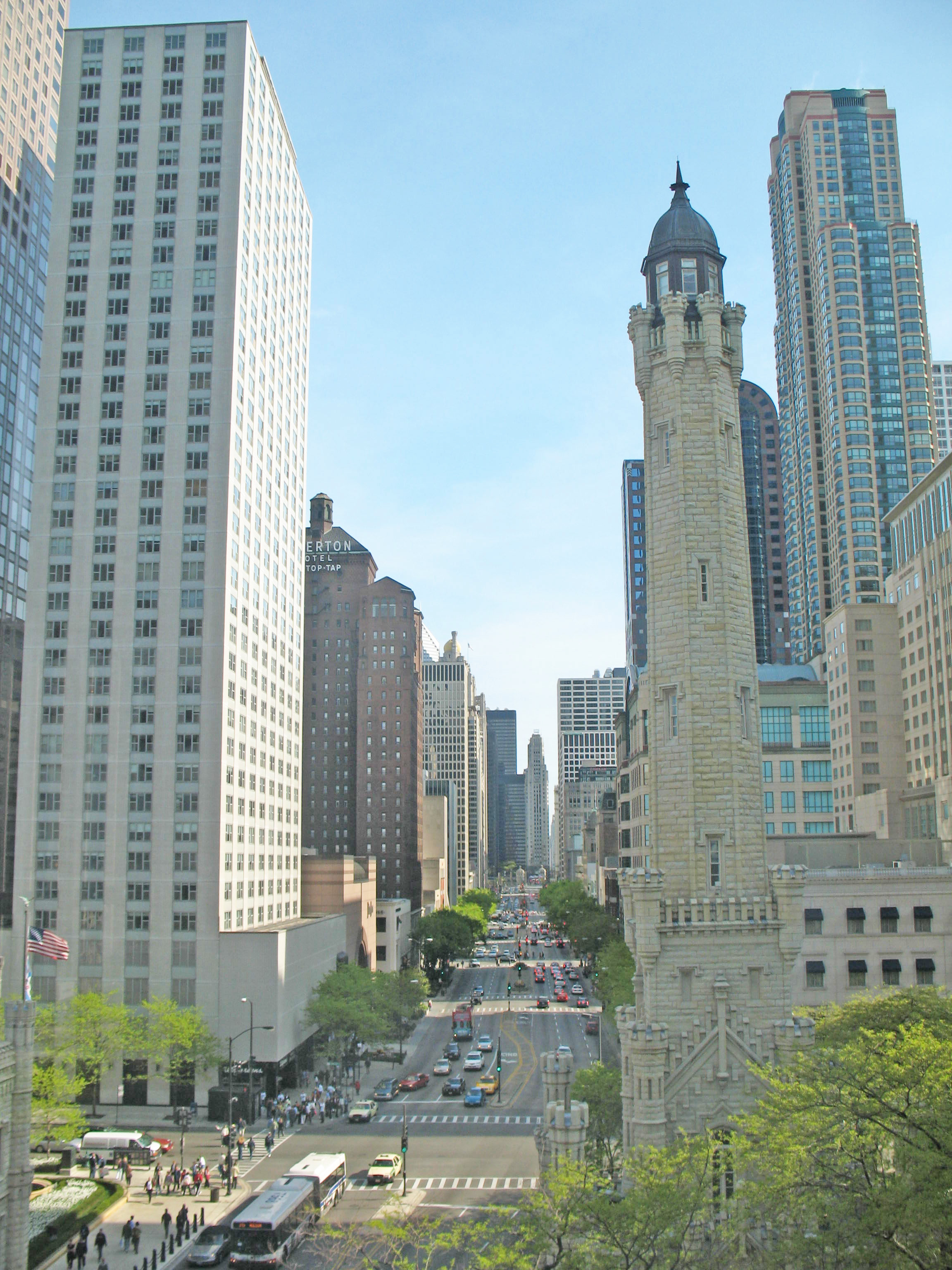
- Chicago's Magnificent Mile looking South
- Nickname: The Mag Mile
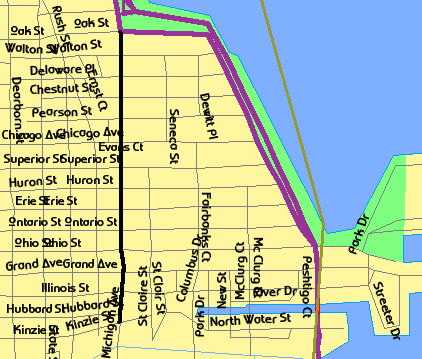
- Streetmap
- Coordinates: 41.89535°N 87.62432°W
- Country: United States
- State: Illinois
- County: Cook
- City: Chicago
- Community areas: List: Near North Side
- Time zone: UTC-6 (CST)
  - Summer (DST): UTC-5 (CDT)

The Magnificent Mile (sometimes locally abbreviated to the Mag Mile) is the approximately one-mile-long stretch of Michigan Avenue from the Chicago River to Oak Street on the Near North Side of Chicago, Illinois. It divides the neighborhood of Streeterville, on its east, from River North, on its west.

The Magnificent Mile is the primary commercial corridor between the Loop and Gold Coast. It hosts numerous retail stores and experiential spaces, hotels, and tourist attractions.

The real estate developer Arthur Rubloff of Rubloff Company gave the district its nickname in 1947. Skyscrapers and landmarks along the Magnificent Mile include the John Hancock Center, the Wrigley Building, Tribune Tower, the Chicago Water Tower, and the Allerton, Drake, and Intercontinental hotels.

== History ==
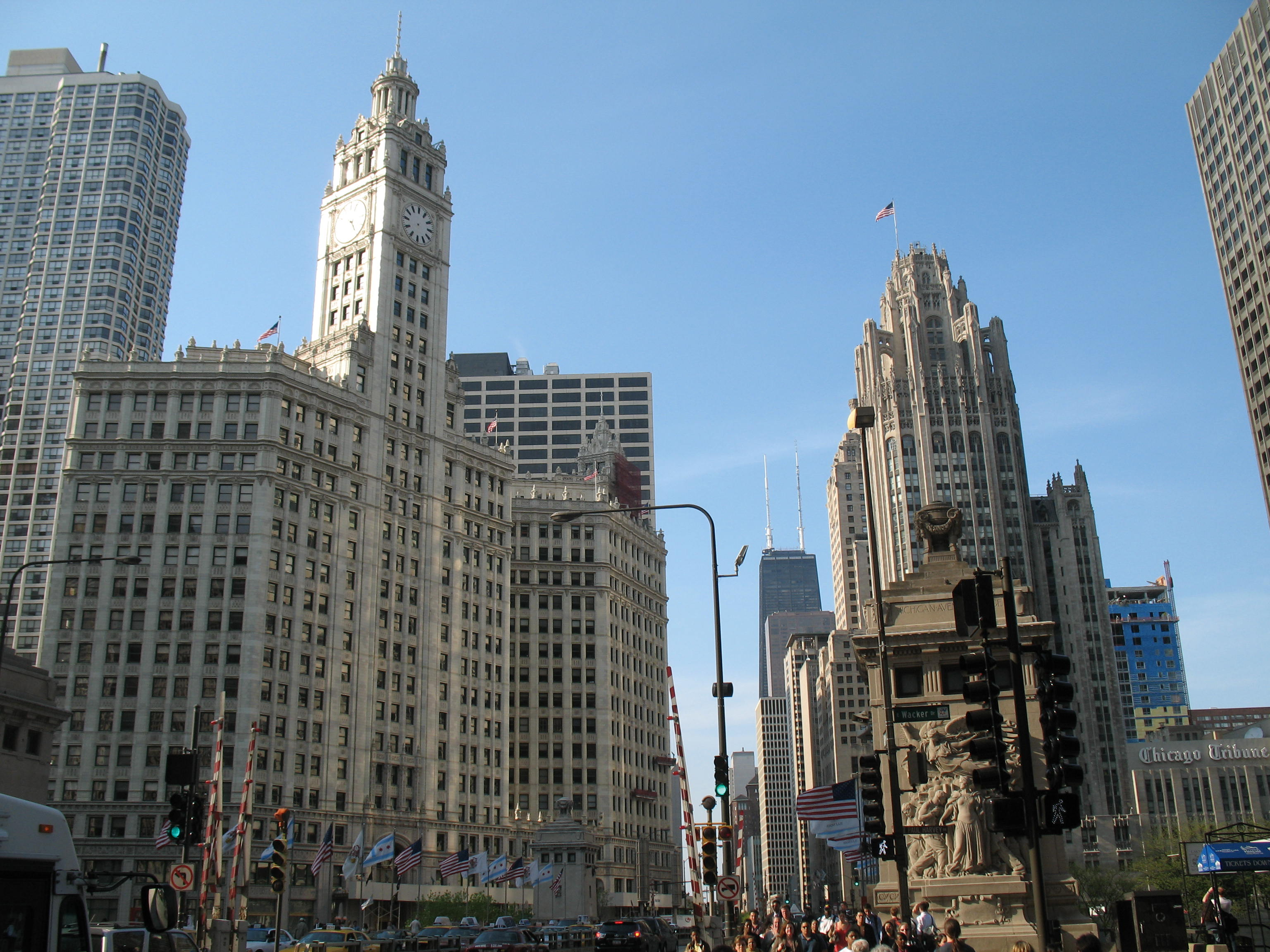
The view north from the foot of the Magnificent Mile in the Michigan–Wacker Historic District: the Beaux Arts Wrigley Building (left) and neo-Gothic Tribune Tower

After the Great Chicago Fire of 1871, State Street (anchored by Marshall Field's) in the downtown Loop, especially the Loop Retail Historic District, was the city's retailing center. The convenience of mass transit including streetcars and elevated trains, supported a retail corridor along State Street from Lake Street to Van Buren Street.

By the 1920s, commuter suburbs began to have significant retail districts. Prior to the bascule bridge construction, swing bridges across the river were open for ship traffic during half the daylight hours. The Rush Street Bridge was the swing bridge for this area. The opening of the Michigan Avenue Bridge in 1920 created a new commercial district.

The concept for the Magnificent Mile was part of the 1909 Burnham Plan of Chicago. It was constructed during the 1920s to replace Pine Street, which had been lined with factories and warehouses near the river, and fine mansion and rowhouse residences farther north. The earliest building constructions varied in style, but challenged new heights in construction. The name the "Magnificent Mile" is a registered trademark of The Magnificent Mile Association, formerly the Greater North Michigan Avenue Association (GNMAA).

After the Great Depression and World War II, Arthur Rubloff and William Zeckendorf bought or controlled most of the property along this stretch of the avenue and supported a plan by Holabird & Root for construction of new buildings and renovation of old ones that took advantage of new zoning laws. Soon the property values driven by the luxury shopping districts were pricing out the nearby artists of Tower Town, just southwest of the Chicago Water Tower. Rubloff and Zeckendorf successfully developed and promoted the area until it became one of the most prestigious addresses of the city, spurring new investment along the Magnificent Mile and throughout the Near North Side.

After 1950, suburban development reduced the Loop's daily significance to many Chicagoans as downtown retail sales slipped. However, the Magnificent Mile kept a luxury shopping district close to the central business district. The opening of the 74-story Water Tower Place in 1975 marked the return of Chicago to retailing prominence. By 1979, the State Street commercial corridor had lost its commercial vitality and was closed to street traffic for renovation including sidewalk widening until 1996.

In late 2025 into early 2026, the Magnificent Mile began to show a resurgence in retail and foot traffic activity following the COVID-19 pandemic. New major openings post-pandemic include the world's third Harry Potter Shop, a Uniqlo flagship, Mango, Aritzia, Leica Camera, Museum of Ice Cream, Hotel Chocolat, high wealth JP Morgan Chase branch, Intimissimi/Falconeri and RIU Hotel. In 2026, the vacancy rate on Michigan Avenue fell to 26%, down from pandemic vacancy high of 33% in 2023. Planned openings in 2027 include the world's first Candy Hall of Fame and a new American Eagle flagship store.

== Description ==
Today, The Magnificent Mile contains a mixture of upscale department stores, restaurants, retailers, residential and commercial buildings, financial services companies, and hotels, catering primarily to tourists. The Magnificent Mile includes 3.1 million sq ft (290,000 m^{2}) of retail space, 460 stores, 275 restaurants, 51 hotels, and a host of sightseeing and entertainment attractions to more than 22 million visitors annually.

The American Planning Association selected The Magnificent Mile as one of the 10 Great Streets for 2007 through its Great Places in America program. In recent years, The Magnificent Mile has added trees and flower-filled medians to reflect the changing seasons.

=== Retail ===
Most luxury brands moved to Oak Street in the years following the 2008 financial crisis. The Magnificent Mile hosts department stores Bloomingdale's, Neiman Marcus, and Nordstrom. Retailers on The Magnificent Mile include: Canada Goose, Cartier, Bulgari, Burberry (its U.S. flagship location), Gucci, Louis Vuitton, Tiffany & Co., Max Mara, St. John, Omega, Rolex, Ralph Lauren (Ralph Lauren's largest store in the world), Kate Spade, Hugo Boss, Salvatore Ferragamo, American Girl, Ermenegildo Zegna, Zara, MCM, Tumi, Kiehl's, J. Crew, H&M, Paul Stuart, David Yurman, Victoria's Secret, and Starbucks Reserve Roastery (largest Starbucks in the world).

The Magnificent Mile has three shopping malls: Water Tower Place, The Shops at North Bridge, and 900 North Michigan Shops. Each spans multiple floors and city blocks and offers various tenants: mall mainstays and more upscale apparel shops, restaurants, and unique attractions, such as museums. In its 2010 book The 10 Best of Everything: An Ultimate Guide for Travelers, National Geographic named The Magnificent Mile along with Rodeo Drive and Fifth Avenue as one of the 10 best shopping avenues in the world. In the aftermath of the COVID-19 pandemic, the Magnificent Mile lost Banana Republic, Gap, Macy's, Uniqlo and Timberland, among other retailers.

=== Hotels and dining ===
Restaurants such as The Signature Room at The 95th, Spiaggia, Tru, The Pump Room, Lawry's The Prime Rib, The Grand Lux, and The Park Hyatt Room provide a variety of dining options. Three 5-star hotels (The Peninsula Chicago, Four Seasons Hotel Chicago, and Ritz-Carlton Chicago) and Illinois' only 4-star hotel (Park Hyatt) are located within about five blocks along The Magnificent Mile.

Other hotels such as the InterContinental Chicago Magnificent Mile, Knickerbocker, Westin, Drake Hotel, and the Hotel Riu Plaza Chicago offer convenient luxurious accommodations as well. Selected luxury-class hotels are shown below:

Name	Street Address	Parent Company
Drake Hotel	140 E. Walton Place	Hilton Hotels
Knickerbocker Hotel	163 E. Walton Place	Millennium Hotels
Westin Michigan Avenue	909 N. Michigan Avenue	Marriott Hotels
Four Seasons Hotel Chicago	900 N. Michigan Avenue – Floors 32–46	Four Seasons Hotels
Ritz-Carlton Chicago	845 N. Michigan Avenue	Marriott Hotels
Park Hyatt	800 N. Michigan Avenue (110 E. Chicago)	Hyatt
The Peninsula Chicago	108 E. Superior Street	The Peninsula Hotels
Allerton Hotel	701 N. Michigan Avenue	
Omni Chicago Hotel	676 N. Michigan Avenue	Omni Hotels
Hotel Riu Plaza Chicago	150 E Ontario Street	RIU Hotels
InterContinental Chicago Magnificent Mile	505 N. Michigan Avenue	InterContinental Hotels Group

=== Banks ===
The largest banks have branches along the strip including the three largest banks in the nation: Bank of America, Citibank, and JPMorgan Chase's Chase Bank. Additionally, the largest banks in Chicago are present, such as Harris Bank, which is technically across the street from The Magnificent Mile. American Express has a Magnificent Mile address for one of its two Chicago service offices. Fidelity Investments has an office at the foot of The Magnificent Mile.

=== Chicago landmarks ===
Historic and landmark presences are shown in the table below, which lists Chicago Landmarks, National Register of Historic Places locations, and National Historic Landmarks along The Magnificent Mile. At the northern edge of this district on the west, one finds the exclusive One Magnificent Mile building and Oak Street running to the west. Also, at the northern edge of the district one finds the Chicago Landmark East Lake Shore Drive District, an extremely expensive and exclusive one-block area of real estate running east from N. Michigan Ave. and facing directly onto Lake Michigan.

At the southern edge of the district, the Michigan Avenue Bridge sits among four majestic 1920s skyscrapers, two of which are on The Magnificent Mile (Tribune Tower and the Wrigley Building), and two of which are not (333 North Michigan and London Guarantee Building). These buildings are contributing properties to the Michigan–Wacker Historic District.

Chicago Landmark	Designation Date	Location	NRHP Date	NHL Date
Drake Hotel	April 18, 1985	140 E. Walton Place	May 8, 1980	
Palmolive Building	February 16, 2000	919 N. Michigan Avenue	August 21, 2003	
Perkins, Fellows & Hamilton Office and Studio	December 1, 1993	814 N. Michigan Avenue		
Old Chicago Water Tower District	October 6, 1971; amended June 10, 1981	806/821 N. Michigan Avenue	April 23, 1975	
Allerton Hotel	May 29, 1998	701 N. Michigan Avenue		
Woman's Athletic Club	October 2, 1991	626 N. Michigan Avenue		
McGraw-Hill Building	February 7, 1997	520 N. Michigan Avenue		
Tribune Tower	February 1, 1989	435 N. Michigan Avenue		
Du Sable, Jean Baptiste Point, Homesite		401 N. Michigan Avenue	May 11, 1976	May 11, 1976
Michigan Avenue Bridge and Esplanade	October 2, 1991	Chicago River, between Michigan and Wabash Avenues		
Site of Fort Dearborn	September 15, 1971	Intersection of N. Michigan Avenue and E. Wacker Drive		

Several of the tallest buildings in Chicago are located in The Magnificent Mile district:

Name	Street Address	Height feet / meters	Floors	Year
875 North Michigan Avenue	875 N. Michigan Avenue	1,127 / 344	100	1969
900 North Michigan	900 N. Michigan Avenue	871 / 265	66	1989
Water Tower Place	845 N. Michigan Avenue	859 / 262	74	1976
Park Tower	800 N. Michigan Avenue	844 / 257	67	2000
Olympia Centre	737 N. Michigan Avenue	725 / 221	63	1986
One Magnificent Mile	980 N. Michigan Avenue	673 / 205	58	1983
Chicago Place	700 N. Michigan Avenue	608 / 185	49	1991
Palmolive Building	919 N. Michigan Avenue	565 / 172	37	1929

=== Malls ===
The Lego Store is a highlight of Water Tower Place. It frequently exhibits lifesize or larger than life characters at the main entrance of the mall.

Mall Image	Construction Date	Floors (Mall/Building)	Anchor Stores	Address	Notes
900 North Michigan Entrance	1989	(6/66)	Bloomingdale's	900 N. Michigan Avenue	
Water Tower Place	1975	(8/74)	VACANT	835 N. Michigan Avenue	
Chicago Place Showcase revolving doors	1991	(8/49)	Saks Fifth Avenue	700 N. Michigan Avenue	This mall has been closed down and is currently in the process of being converted into office space.
The Shops at North Bridge Entrance	2000	(5/-)	Nordstrom	520 N. Michigan Avenue (600 North Michigan Avenue)^{*}	

== Seasonal events ==
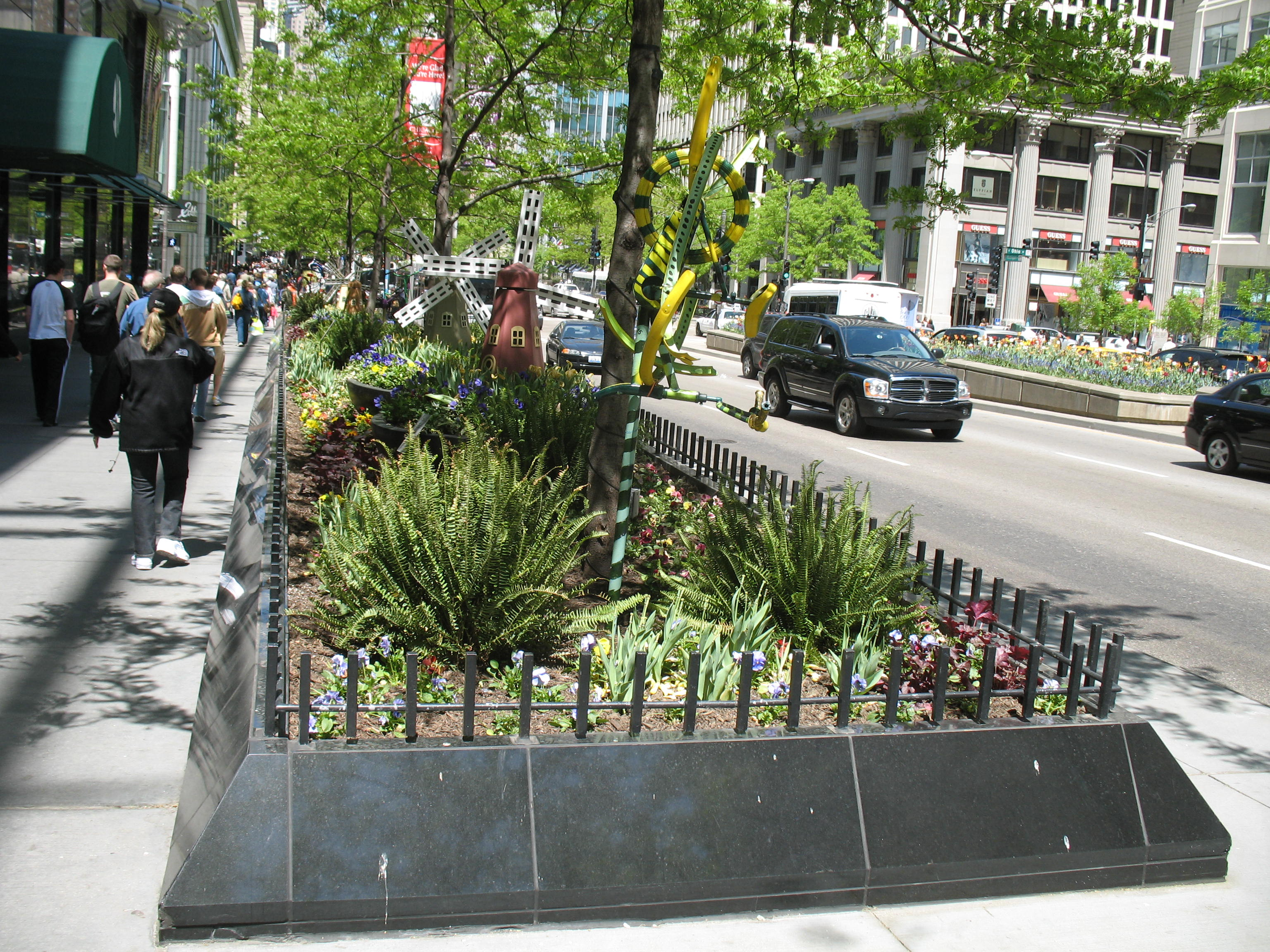
Magnificent Mile garden planter (with visible median planter).

With each season, the ambiance of The Magnificent Mile changes. This change is signaled by several official events:

Median planters were constructed as part of a streetscape improvement project in 1994. In the spring, hundreds of thousands of tulips bloom from mid April until the end of May. In 2008, a public art installation of kinetic sculptures designed by local and international architects was placed in the garden beds.

During the summer, the "Gardens of The Magnificent Mile" festival event occurs. It is a self-guided landscape display walking tour. In 2007 and 2008, fashion dress forms graced the garden beds. The forms were designed by students from the Illinois Institute of Art – Chicago and the International Academy of Design and Technology, as well as prominent designers located on the Avenue.

In 2009 and 2010, the first ever Summer Concert Series presented by Walgreens brought top level musical talent to the Avenue for free lunchtime shows for guests, locals, and employees of the Avenue. Past artists include: Collective Soul, Better Than Ezra, Mat Kearney, Michael Franti, Kris Allen, and Guster.

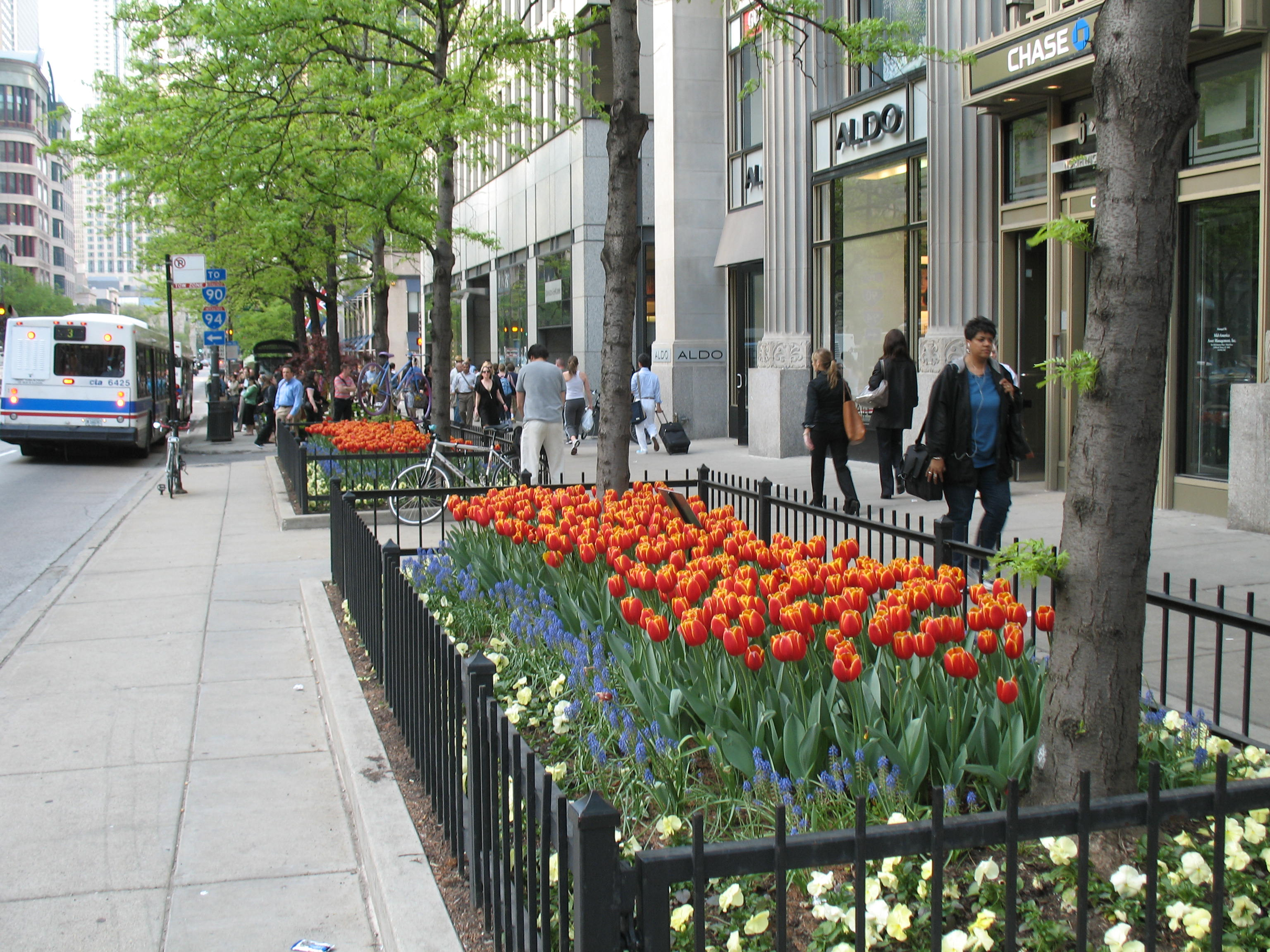
2007 Tulip Days on The Magnificent Mile with CTA bus in view.

The tradition of lighting the trees of The Magnificent Mile to start the Christmas season extends more than forty years. More than one million lights are lit and fireworks follow the event. The Magnificent Mile Lights Festival, presented by BMO Harris Bank, is the annual kick-off to Chicago's Christmas season.

The day of the event has special activities and offers across Magnificent Mile businesses, plus interactive holiday booths in Pioneer Court, and a free concert with free concerts featuring popular artists all afternoon on the Harris Stage (past artists have included Jason Mraz, Mitchel Musso, and KT Tunstall). In the evening, Mickey Mouse and Minnie Mouse lead a procession down Michigan Avenue from Oak Street to Wacker Drive, stopping at each block to light the trees. He brings along other Disney friends, marching bands, celebrities and more. It is considered the first annual Christmas procession of the year.

== Transportation and infrastructure ==
North Michigan Avenue is a six-lane two-way street that is serviced by Chicago Transit Authority public buses along the Magnificent Mile that connect the area to the entire Chicago metropolitan area. It is also serviced by seasonal trolley service along the street, and the foot of the Magnificent Mile is serviced by seasonal water transit services. Two blocks west along State Street, the Chicago 'L' rapid transit services the street via its Red Line. Pedestrian traffic abounds along the broad sidewalks that are shielded by extensive, mature greenery that provides much of the friendly atmosphere.

In autumn 2011, North Michigan Avenue was completely repaved from the Chicago River to Oak Street with a durable stone-matrix asphalt pavement mix that incorporated high levels of recycled materials, including waste shingles, ground tire rubber, and asphalt millings, diverting some 800 tons of material from landfills. The $1 million project was completed without ever completely halting traffic on the street. In July 2012, the City of Chicago and CDOT were honored with the Environmental Leadership Award from the National Asphalt Pavement Association.

=== Intersections ===
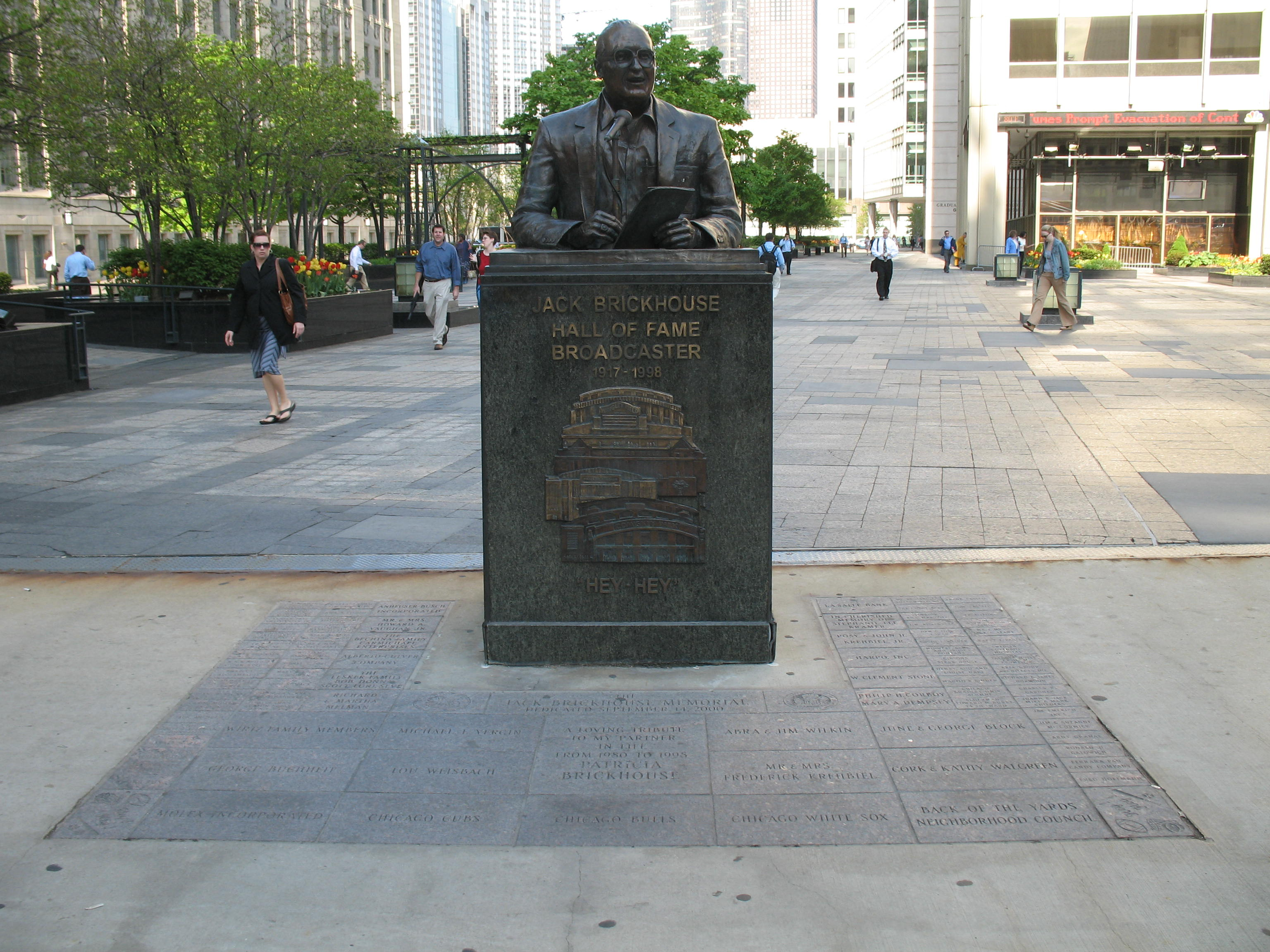
A bust of Cubs and Bears announcer Jack Brickhouse

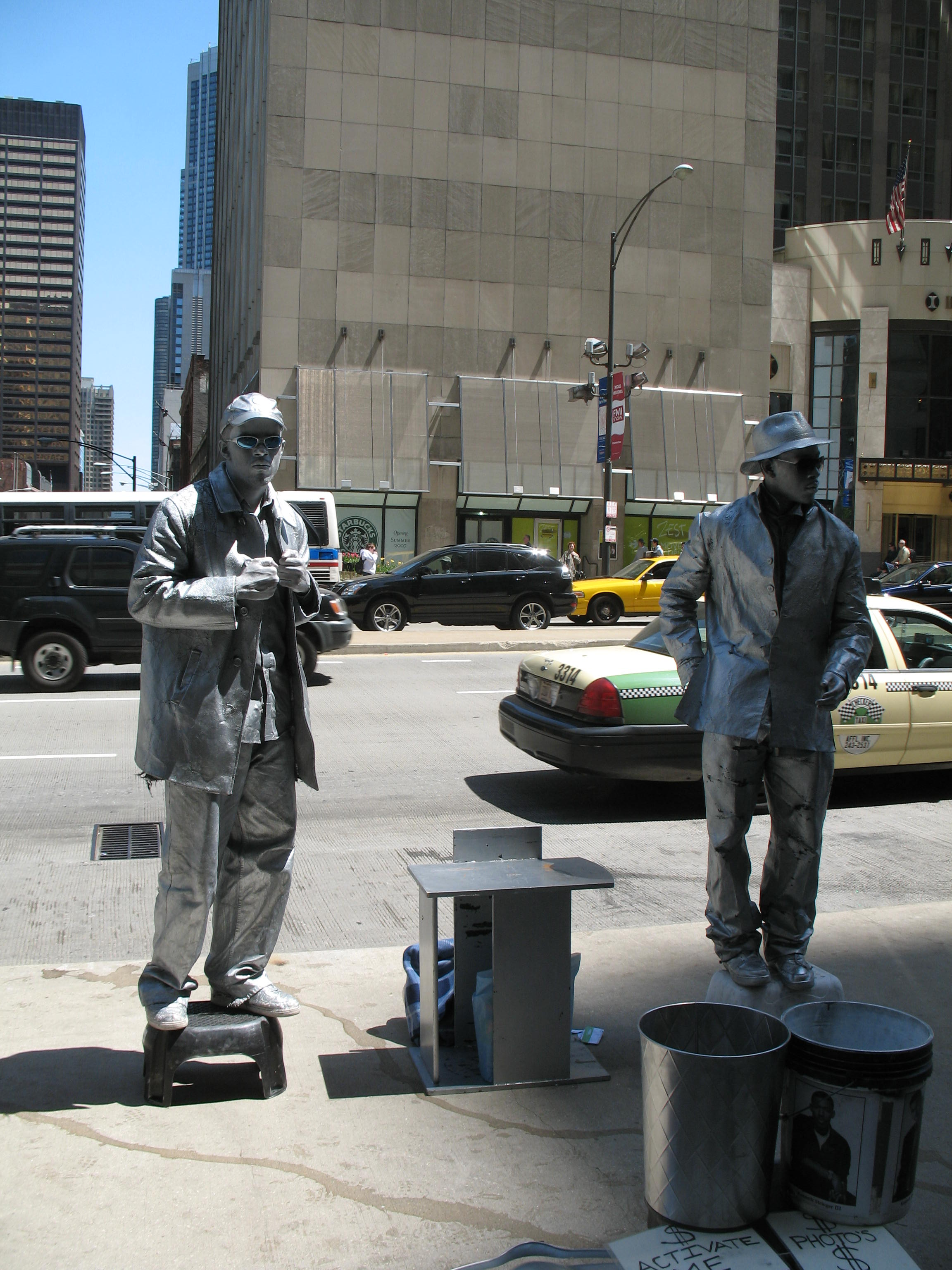
Public performers are common on the Magnificent mile.

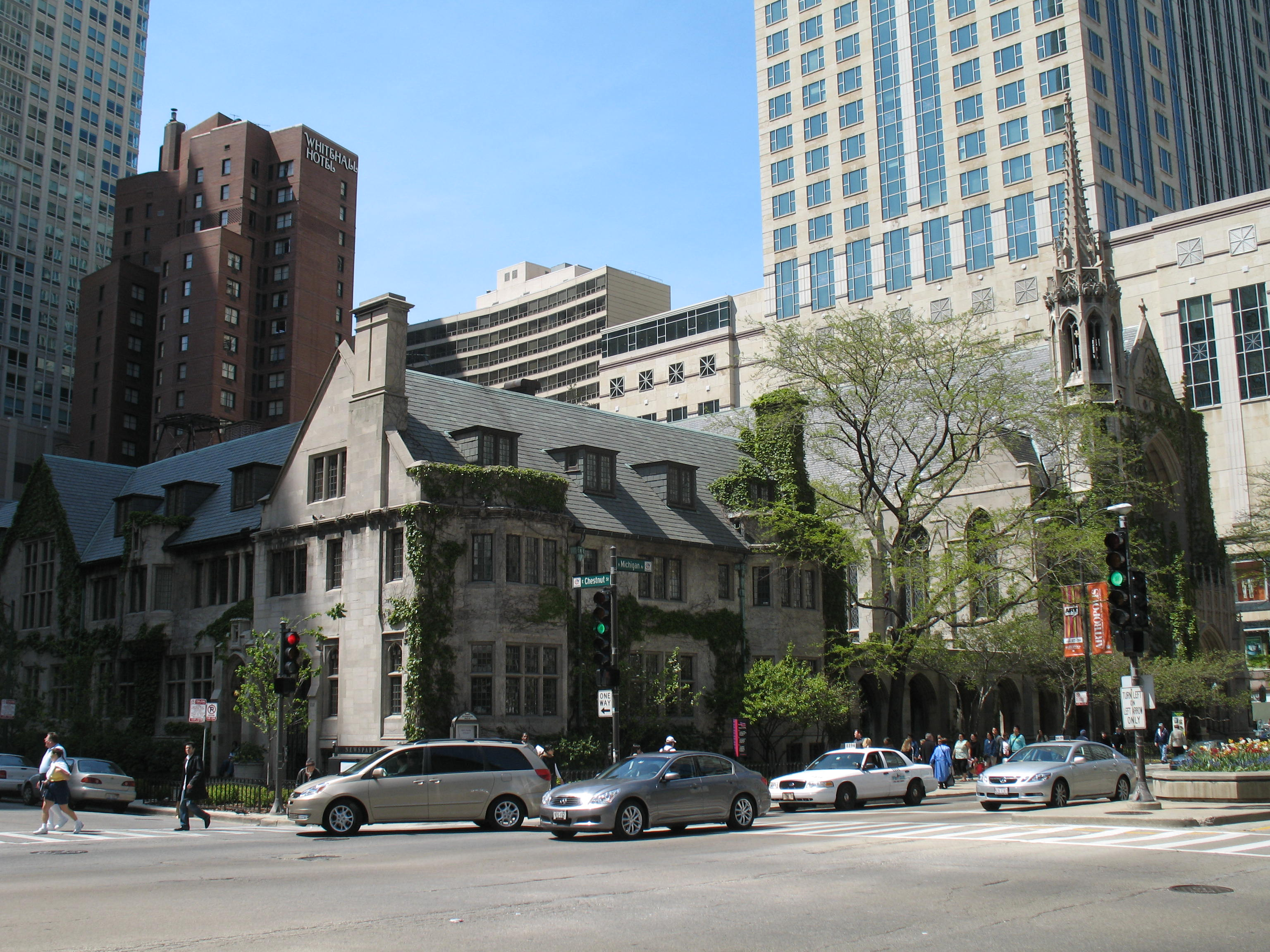
The Fourth Presbyterian Church moved its congregation to North Michigan Avenue in 1914.

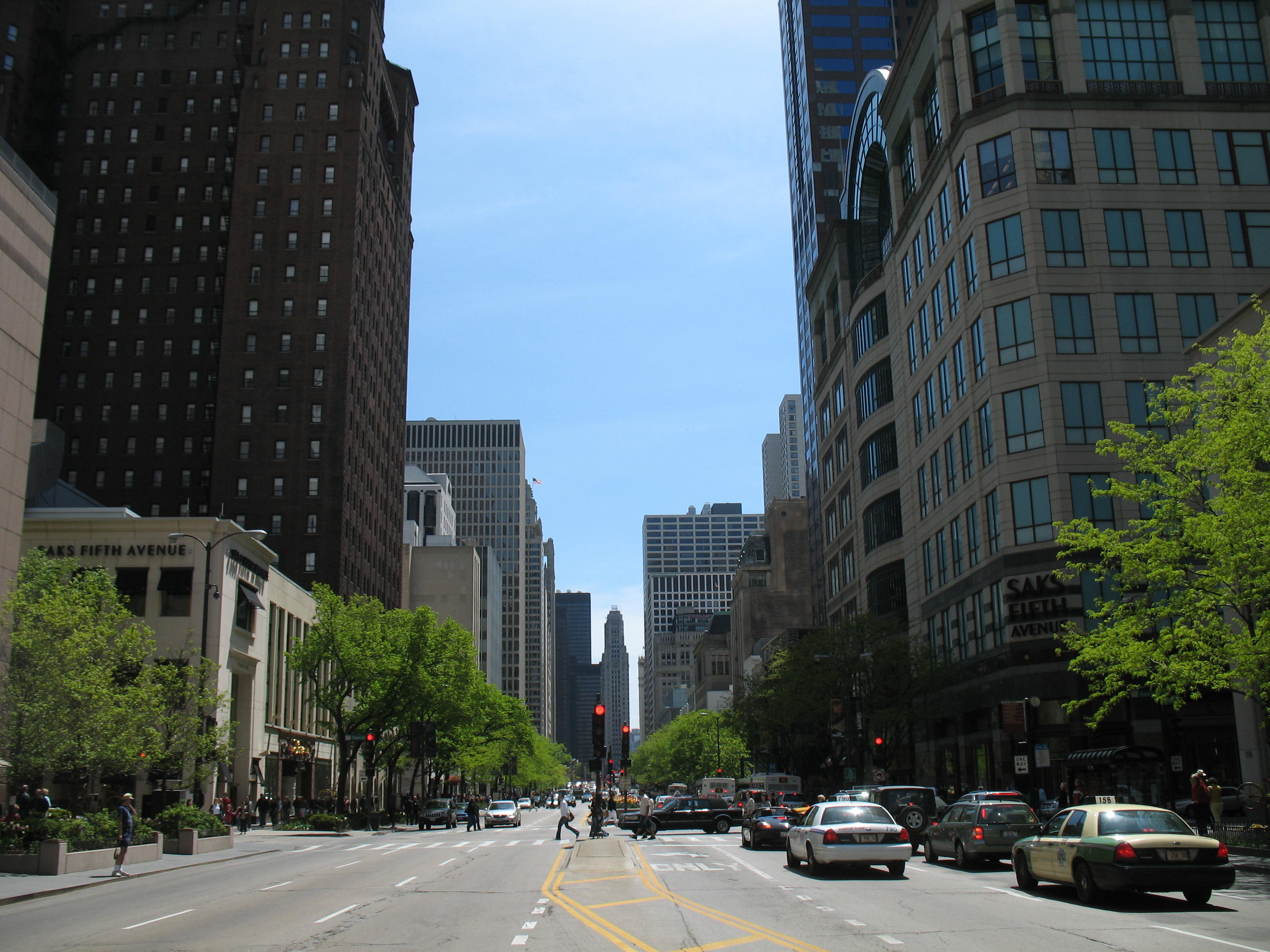
Superior Street & Michigan hosts Saks Fifth Avenue

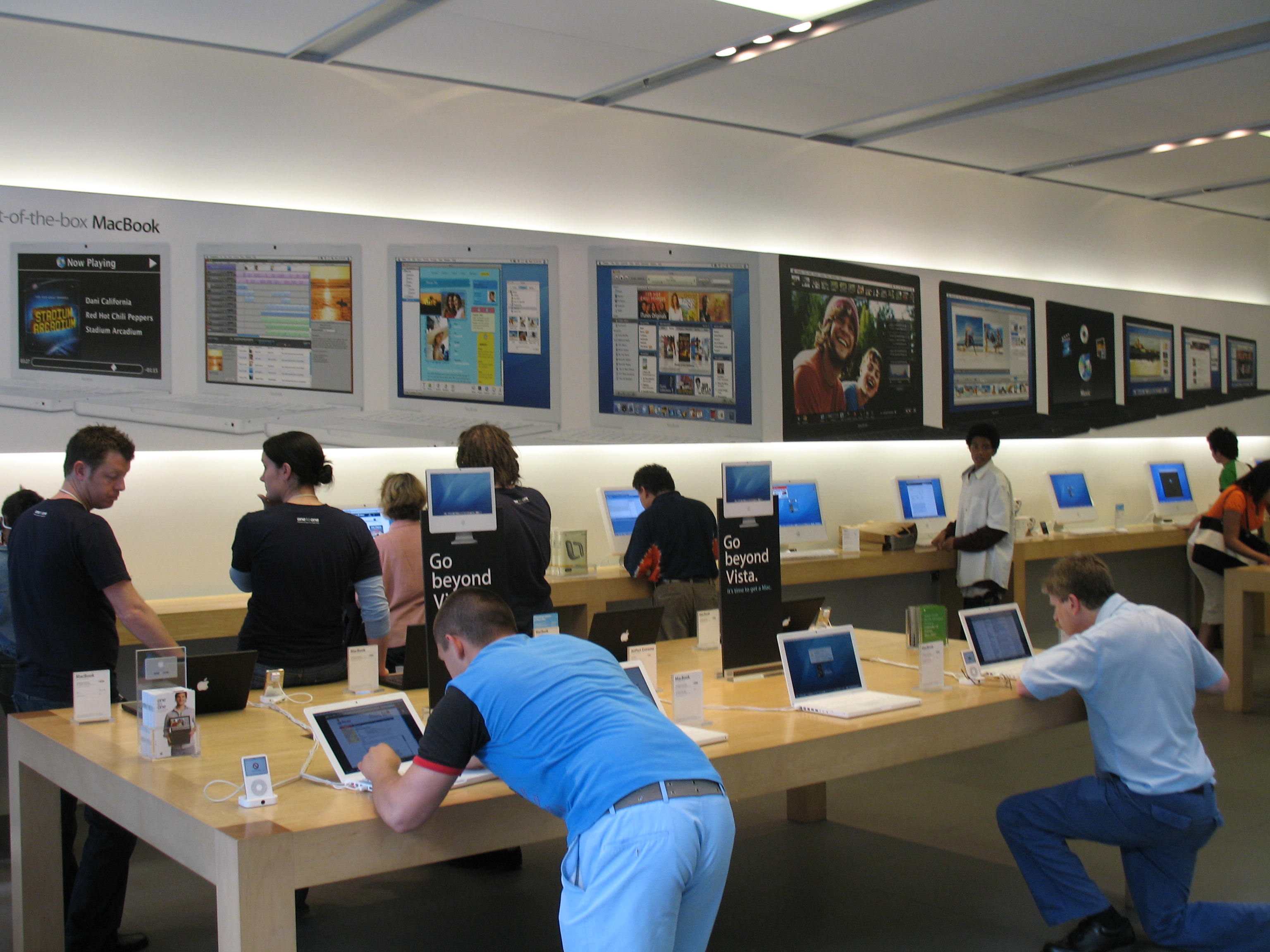
Customers at the Apple store on Michigan.

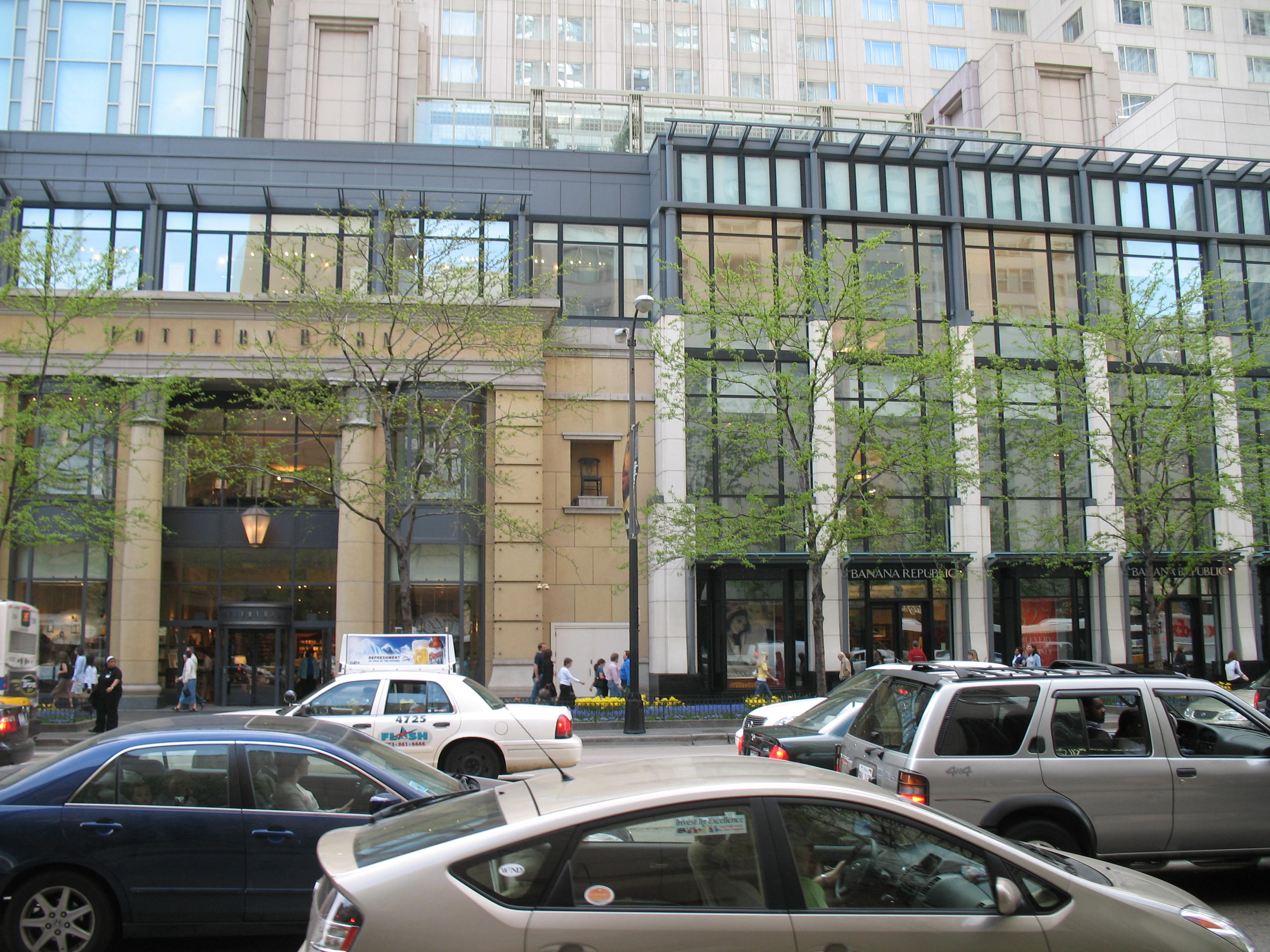
The upper 700 block of the Magnificent Mile has flagship Pottery Barn (closed) and Banana Republic locations nestled between its Tiffany & Co. and Polo Ralph Lauren corner stores.

Cross Street Image	Address	Intersection Type	Cross Street Type	Commerce
Oak Street & Michigan	1000 North	Pedestrian (E, W, S) Street, Pedestrian (N, E) Underpass, Vehicular	Lighted Intersection (Two-way)	NW: Harris Bank NE: Chicago Park District; SW: One Magnificent Mile; SE: Chanel at the Drake Hotel
Walton Street & Michigan	932 North			NE: Drake Hotel; SW: Gucci at 900 North Michigan; SE: Louis Vuitton
Delaware Place & Michigan	900 North	Pedestrian (E, W, S, N) Street Vehicular southbound turning lane	Lighted Intersection (One-Way Eastbound)	NW: Max Mara at 900 North Michigan NE: Fratelli Rossetti at Westin Hotel; SW: Fourth Presbyterian Church; SE: The North Face at John Hancock Center
Chestnut Street & Michigan	860 North	Pedestrian (E, W, S, N) Street Vehicular northbound turning lane	Lighted Intersection (One-Way Westbound)	NW: Fourth Presbyterian Church NE: Best Buy at John Hancock Center; SW: Water Tower Place; SE: Plaza Escada
Pearson Street & Michigan	830 North	Pedestrian (E, W, S, N) Street Vehicular southbound turning lane	Lighted Intersection (One-Way Eastbound)	NW: Topshop, Uniqlo, Columbia Sportswear, H&M NE: Macy's at Water Tower Place; SW: Chicago Water Tower; SE: Chicago Avenue Pumping Station
Chicago Avenue & Michigan	800 North	Pedestrian (E, W, S, N) Street Vehicular northbound and westbound turning lanes	Lighted Intersection (Two-Way)	NW: Chicago Water Tower NE: Chicago Avenue Pumping Station; SW: Polo Ralph Lauren and The Peninsula Hotel; SE: Walgreens
Superior & Michigan	732 North	Pedestrian (E, W, S, N) Street Vehicular southbound turning lane	Lighted Intersection (One-Way Eastbound)	NW: Tiffany & Co. and The Peninsula Hotel NE: Neiman-Marcus; SW: Chicago Place (Saks Fifth Avenue for women); SE: Saks Fifth Avenue for men
Huron Street & Michigan	700 North	Pedestrian (E, W, S, N) Street Vehicular northbound turning lane	Lighted Intersection (One-Way Westbound)	NW: Talbots @ Chicago Place NE: Nine West @ Allerton Hotel; SW: Express; SE: Apple, Inc.
Erie Street & Michigan	658 North	Pedestrian (E, W, S, N) Street Vehicular southbound turning lane	Lighted Intersection (One-Way Eastbound)	NW: Hanig's Footwear NE: Garmin; SW: Crate & Barrel; SE: Ferragamo
Ontario Street & Michigan	628 North	Pedestrian (E, W, S, N) Street Vehicular northbound turning lane	Lighted Intersection (One-Way Westbound)	NW: Cartier NE: Burberry; SW: Ann Taylor; SE: Coach
Ohio Street & Michigan	600 North	Pedestrian (E, W, S, N) Street Vehicular southbound turning lane	Lighted Intersection (One-Way Eastbound)	NW: Eddie Bauer NE: 605 N. Michigan (Sephora also:American Express, Chase Bank); SW: Forever 21; SE: Gap
Grand Avenue & Michigan underpass	530 North	Pedestrian (N) Street, (E, W) Sidewalk	Lighted Intersection / Vehicular Underpass (One-Way Westbound)	NW: Kenneth Cole NE: Westfield North Bridge; SW: Atlas Galleries; SE: Intercontinental Hotel
Illinois Street & Michigan	500 North	Pedestrian (N, E) Street, (W) Sidewalk	Lighted Intersection (Eastbound sidestreet) / Vehicular Underpass (One-Way Eastbound)	NW: Bank of America @ 500 N. Michigan Avenue NE: Intercontinental Hotel; SW: 444 N. Michigan Avenue; SE: McCormick Tribune Freedom Museum
Hubbard Street & Michigan	430 North	Pedestrian (N, S) Street, (E, W) Sidewalk	Lighted Intersection / Vehicular Underpass	W: Walgreens @ 430 N. Michigan Avenue (Realtor Building) E: Tribune Tower
North Water Street (lower)/Jack Brickhouse Way (upper) & Michigan	410 North (upper)/400 North (lower)	Pedestrian (N) Street, (E, W) Sidewalk	Double Jughandle U-Turn lanes	NW: Wrigley Building NE: DuSable Homesite @ 401 N. Michigan Avenue; SW: Michigan Avenue Bridge; SE: Michigan Avenue Bridge
Chicago River				NW: NE: SW: SE:
