= Fourth Presbyterian Church =

Fourth Presbyterian Church may refer to:

- Fourth Presbyterian Church (Chicago), Illinois
- Fourth Presbyterian Church (Bethesda, Maryland)
