= 45 Christopher Street =

Condominium in Manhattan, New York

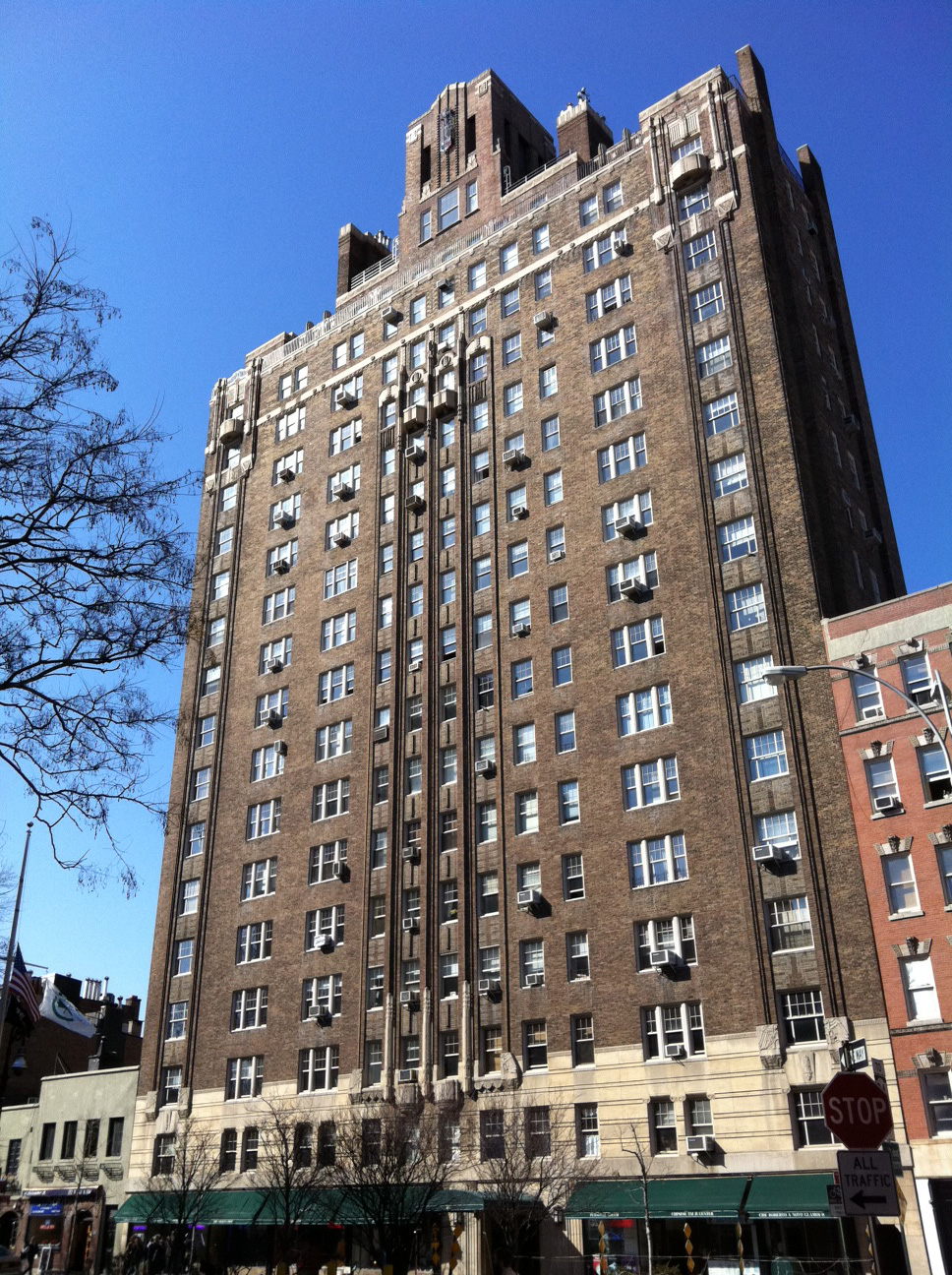
- On Christopher Park
- Interactive map of the 45 Christopher Street area

General information
- Type: Condominium
- Architectural style: Art Deco
- Location: Christopher Park, 45 Christopher Street, New York, New York 10014, United States
- Coordinates: 40°44′02″N 74°00′06.5″W
- Current tenants: 113 apartments
- Construction started: 1929
- Completed: 1931
- Renovated: Converted to condominiums in 1987

Technical details
- Floor count: 18 including two penthouse floors

Design and construction
- Architect: Boak & Paris
- Developer: Bing & Bing

45 Christopher Street is a residential building on the north side of Christopher Street, near Christopher Park, in the Greenwich Village neighborhood of Manhattan in New York City.

It was built by the developer brothers Bing & Bing with the architectural firm of Boak & Paris. Russell M. Boak and Hyman F. Paris left the architectural firm of Emery Roth to start their own practice in 1927.

The building was granted an occupancy license on July 17, 1931.

== Development ==
The construction of 45 Christopher Street was part of a simultaneous development of five buildings in the area. Bing & Bing also worked with Boak and Paris on 302 West 12th Street. They chose architect Emery Roth for both 299 West 12th Street and 59 West 12th Street. In addition, they chose to work with architect Robert T. Lyons on 2 Horatio Street.

== Rivalry with Central Park West ==
Leo Bing announced on April 1, 1929, that his firm had quietly acquired 75 small lots and old buildings largely around Abingdon Square, Sheridan Square and Jackson Square Park. And the lots would be combined to allow for a set of larger-scale, 17-story apartment buildings.

He said his goal was to "recreate the entire district as a modern counterpart of the high-class residential section it once was" saying it would "rival Central Park West and the fashionable east side within a few years." He cited the goal of neighborhood reinvention as the reason for the simultaneous building, saying his hope was that "complete transformation of the section may be achieved as quickly as possible."

Despite the start of the Great Depression just months after Leo Bing's announcement, by September 1931, Bing & Bing reported that the "five new buildings on Christopher, Horatio and West Twelfth Streets are proving among the most popular of all the Bing & Bing apartment properties. Callers have been numerous…and a high percentage of the space has been leased."

== Notable residents and events ==
- Theodor Adorno, philosopher and cultural theorist and Gastona Marie Rossilli, fashion-behavioral consultant, were residents.
- One of the ground floor shops was Lawrence R. Maxwell Books, where Anaïs Nin worked when she was young.
- The building is adjacent to the Stonewall Inn; the windows of a ground floor shop were smashed during the Stonewall riots.
- In 1934, an explosion in the 17th floor penthouse killed the occupant and injured many people on lower floors; police suspected suicide caused by a recent divorce.
