= 299 West 12th Street =

Residential skyscraper in Manhattan, New York

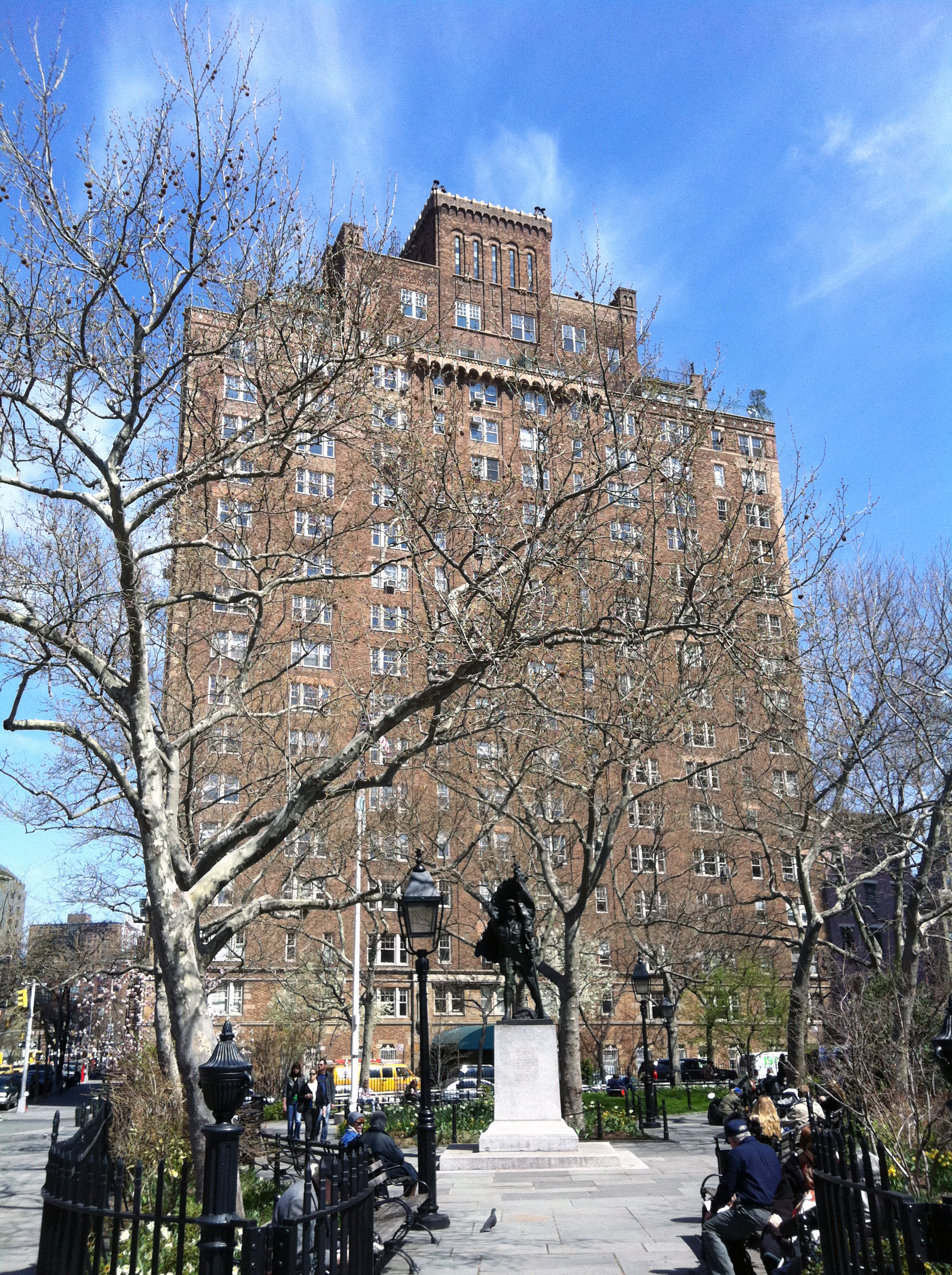
- On Abingdon Square Park
- Interactive map of the 299 West 12th Street area

General information
- Type: Condominium apartment
- Architectural style: Art Deco
- Location: Abingdon Square Park, Greenwich Village, 299 West 12th Street, New York, New York 10014, United States
- Coordinates: 40°44′15.57″N 74°0′18.85″W
- Current tenants: 183 apartments
- Construction started: 1929
- Inaugurated: July 30, 1931

Technical details
- Floor count: 18 including two penthouse floors

Design and construction
- Architect: Emery Roth
- Developer: Bing & Bing

299 West 12th Street is a residential building facing south onto Abingdon Square Park in the Greenwich Village Historic District on the west side of Lower Manhattan in New York City. It was built by the developer brothers Bing & Bing and noted architect Emery Roth whose other works include The Beresford and The El Dorado.

The building was granted an occupancy license on July 30, 1931, opening initially as an "apartment hotel" with a kitchen on the ground floor. In 1986, 299 West 12th Street and its sister building, 302 West 12th Street, were converted into condominiums, containing mainly studio and one bedroom units. It houses 183 condominium apartments.

== Development ==
299 West 12th Street was part of a simultaneous development of five buildings in the area. Bing & Bing also used Roth to design 59 West 12th Street. They worked with the architectural firm of Boak and Paris on both 302 West 12th Street and 45 Christopher Street. They chose to work with architect Robert T. Lyons on 2 Horatio Street.

Prior to the erection of 299 and 302 West 12th Street, the northern side of Abingdon Square Park was the site of several well regarded five-story row houses. “[C]onstructed of red brick and with artistic wrought iron balcony railings,” notes a New York Times article of the day, “the houses have not only always been well kept, but have been occupied by many prominent residents of the ninth ward.” The destruction of the houses and their replacement with a 16-story high rise were cited by local residents as changing the demographic of the neighborhood in what can be seen as an early case of gentrification in New York City. Since 1969, designation of the Greenwich Village Historic District has helped restrict other such developments in the area.

== Rivaling Central Park West ==
Leo Bing, announced on April 1, 1929, that his firm had quietly acquired 75 small lots and old buildings largely around Abingdon Square, Sheridan Square and Jackson Square Park. And the lots would be combined to allow for a set of larger-scale, 17-story apartment buildings.

He said his goal was to "recreate the entire district as a modern counterpart of the high-class residential section it once was" saying it would "rival Central Park West and the fashionable east side within a few years." He cited the goal of neighborhood reinvention as the reason for the simultaneous building, saying his hope was that "complete transformation of the section may be achieved as quickly as possible.”

Also, in more practical terms, he mentioned the "imminent" IND Eighth Avenue Line, and recent completion of the West Side Elevated Highway and even the Holland Tunnel as increasing accessibility to—and demand for—the area.

Despite the start of the Great Depression just months after Leo Bing's announcement, by September 1931 Bing & Bing reported that the "five new buildings on Christopher, Horatio and West Twelfth Streets are proving among the most popular of all the Bing & Bing apartment properties. Callers have been numerous...and a high percentage of the space has been leased.”

== Recent real estate trends ==
In recent years, units in the building have been priced higher than average for the area partly because of restrictions on new construction in the West Village and the resulting dearth of condo options. In 2006, a listing for the building's penthouse caused a stir for what was then viewed as an exorbitant asking price of $3.5 million. In 2011, after a well-publicized apartment search, Jennifer Aniston purchased both the penthouse and a one bedroom unit beneath it for a combined $7.9 million with the intention of converting them into a duplex. The actress abandoned her plans in 2012 after less than a year of ownership and the units were sold to another owner within the building. They have since been incorporated into a triplex that was listed for $30 million in July, 2012.

== Trivia ==
This building was featured in the 2006 feature film Lucky Number Slevin together with its sister building 302 West 12th Street.
