= 59 West 12th Street =

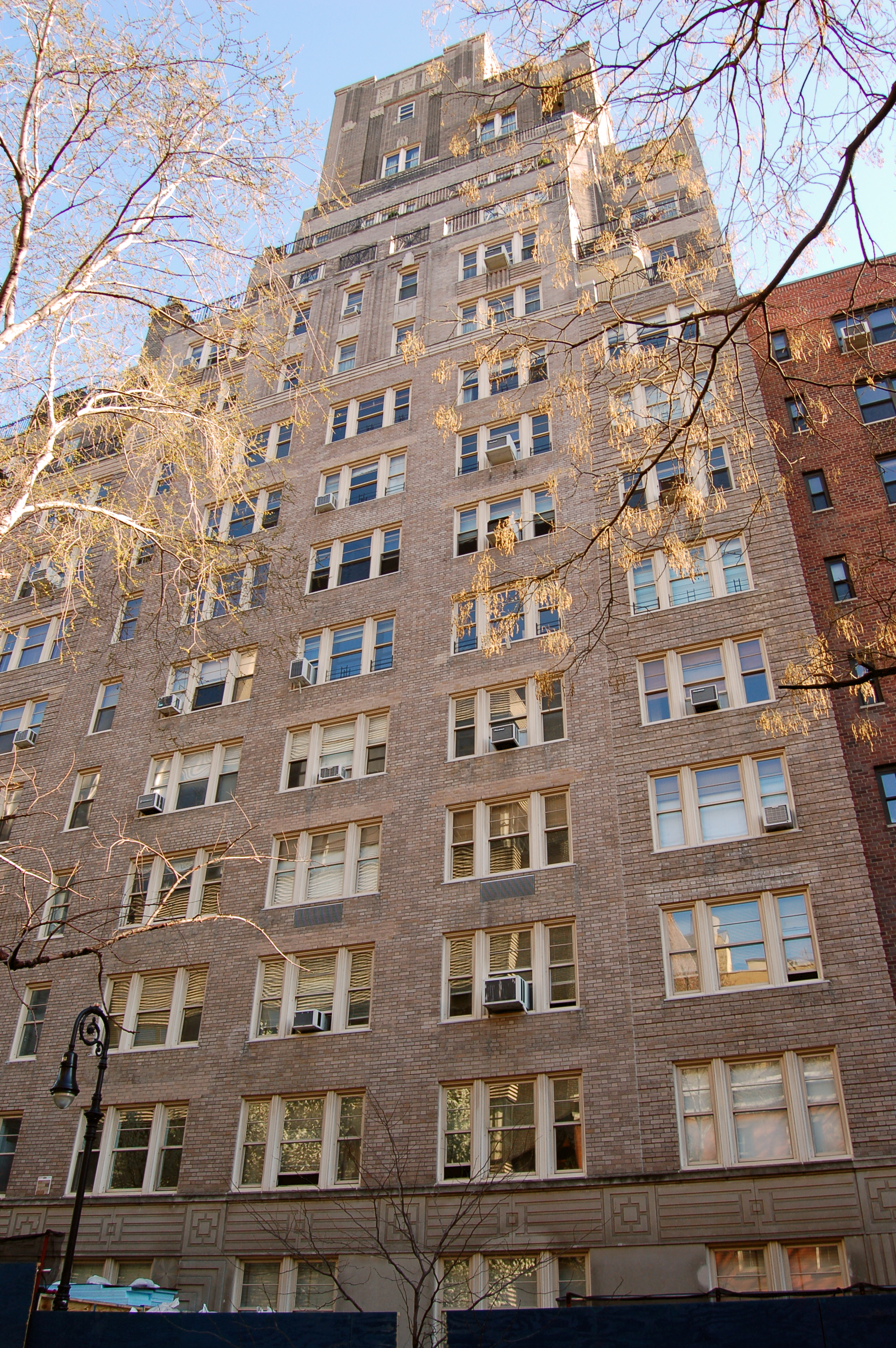
- Between 5th and 6th Avenues
- Interactive map of the 59 West 12th Street area

General information
- Type: Condominium apartment
- Architectural style: Art Deco
- Location: Greenwich Village, 59 West 12th Street, New York, New York 10011, United States
- Coordinates: 40°44′8.66″N 73°59′49.42″W
- Current tenants: 101 apartments
- Construction started: 1929
- Inaugurated: August 7, 1931

Technical details
- Floor count: 18 including two penthouse floors

Design and construction
- Architect: Emery Roth
- Developer: Bing & Bing

59 West 12th Street is a residential building located in the Greenwich Village Historic District in Lower Manhattan, New York City, United States.

It was built by the developer brothers Bing & Bing with noted architect Emery Roth whose other work includes The Beresford and The El Dorado.

It was granted a certificate of occupancy on August 7, 1931 and houses 101 condominium apartments.

== Development ==
It was part of a simultaneous development of five buildings in the area.

Bing and Bing also used Roth to design 299 West 12th Street.

They worked with the architectural firm of Boak and Paris on both 302 West 12th Street and 45 Christopher Street.

And they chose to work with architect Robert T. Lyons on 2 Horatio Street.

== Rivaling Central Park West ==
Leo Bing announced on April 1, 1929 that his firm had quietly acquired 75 small lots and old buildings largely around Abingdon Square, Sheridan Square and Jackson Square Park. And the lots would be combined to allow for a set of larger-scale, 17-story apartment buildings.

He said his goal was to "recreate the entire district as a modern counterpart of the high-class residential section it once was" saying it would "rival Central Park West and the fashionable east side within a few years." He cited the goal of neighborhood reinvention as the reason for the simultaneous building, saying his hope was that "complete transformation of the section may be achieved as quickly as possible."

Despite the start of the Great Depression just months after Leo Bing's announcement, by September 1931, Bing & Bing reported that the "five new buildings on Christopher, Horatio and West Twelfth Streets are proving among the most popular of all the Bing & Bing apartment properties. Callers have been numerous … and a high percentage of the space has been leased."

== Notable residents ==
Once the home of:

- Cameron Diaz (born 1972), actress
- Lena Dunham (born 1986), actress
- Larry Dvoskin, songwriter/musician
- Carol Greitzer (born 1925), politician who served in the New York City Council from 1969 to 1991 and was the first president of NARAL Pro-Choice America
- Jimi Hendrix (1942–1970), singer, songwriter, guitarist
- John Lardner (1912–1960), sports writer
- Bryan Lourd (born 1960), talent agent
- Isaac Mizrahi (born 1961), designer
- Bebe Neuwirth (born 1958), actress/dancer
- Jonathan Pryce (born 1947), actor
- Marisa Tomei (born 1964), actress
- John Waters (born 1946), director
- Joseph Cataldo (1908 - 1980), a former restaurateur, club owner, casino operator in Havana, Cuba and a "made man" in the Greenwich Village crew of the Genovese crime family under the nickname "Joe the Wop"
