= 2 Horatio Street =

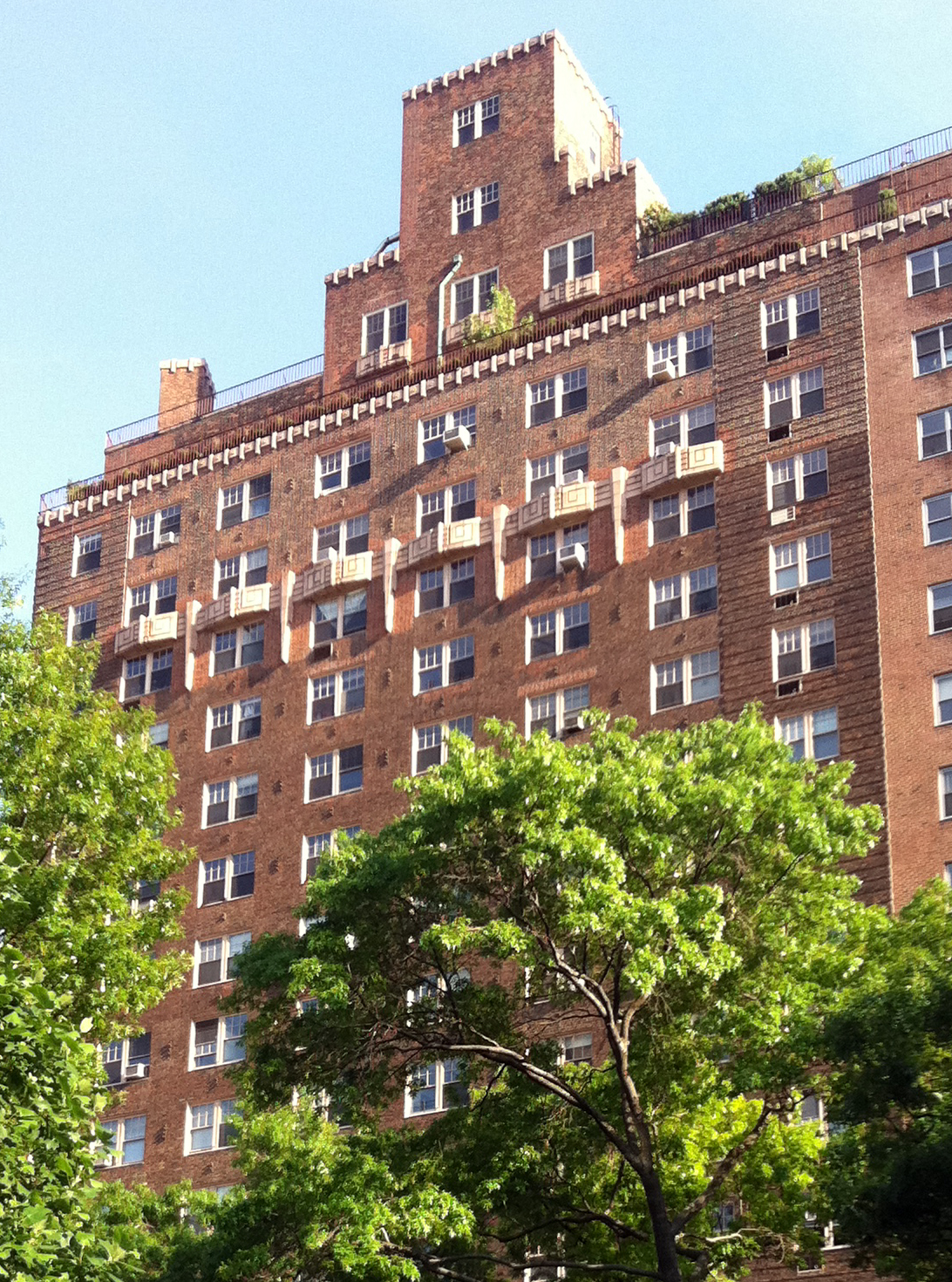

- Location within New York City

General information
- Status: Completed
- Type: Co-op apartment
- Architectural style: Art Deco
- Location: at Jackson Square Park, 2–8 Horatio Street, New York, New York 10014, U.S.
- Coordinates: 40°44′19.3″N 74°00′9.5″W
- Current tenants: 242 apartments
- Construction started: 1929
- Inaugurated: August 7, 1931
- Renovated: 1959–63 west wing addition

Height
- Tip: 61.88 m
- Roof: 49.68 m

Technical details
- Floor count: 17 including penthouse

Design and construction
- Architect: Robert T. Lyons
- Developer: Bing & Bing

2-10 Horatio Street is a 17-story co-operative apartment building located between Greenwich and Eighth Avenues, on the corner of Greenwich Avenue, across from Jackson Square Park in the Greenwich Village neighborhood of Manhattan, New York City, United States. Built in 1929–31 and designed by Robert T. Lyons, the building is located within the Greenwich Village Historic District, but is not an individual landmark. The building also has the address 123-129 Greenwich Avenue.

Between 1959 and 1963, an addition to the western end of the building, fronting on Horatio Street, added four apartments per floor, as well as air conditioning and new windows. This section of the building occupies what was the site of the Caledonian Club, at #8-10 from 1880 to 1897 after which it was occupied by a number of church-related organizations. Altogether, the building, along with the 17-story apartment building at 54 Eighth Avenue – also known as #14-18 Horatio Street – at the other end of the block, replaced six older low-level buildings. The building is known for having a number of celebrity residents.

== Development ==
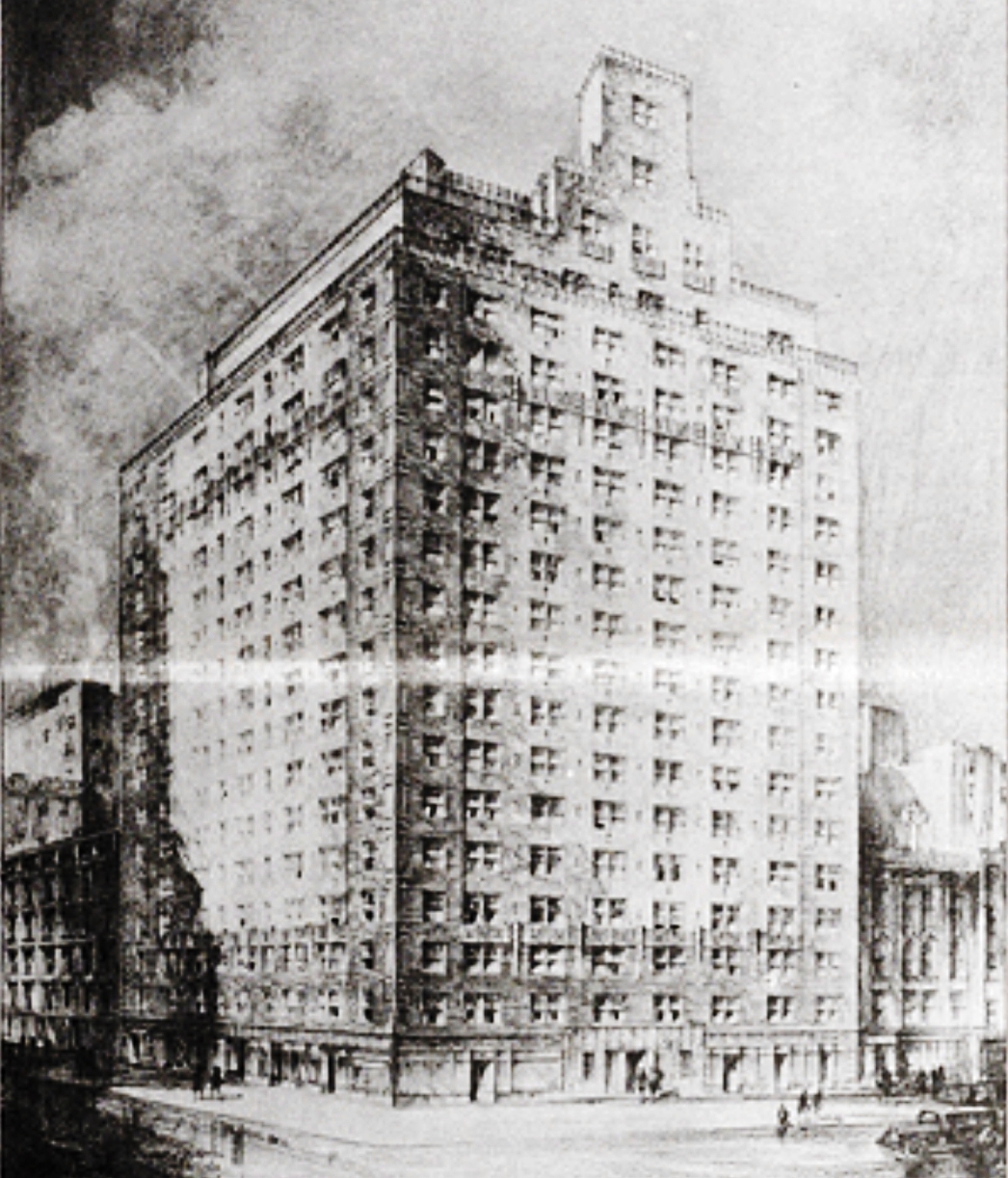
2 Horatio Street in 1931

On April 1, 1929, the real estate development firm Bing & Bing – founded in 1906 by brothers Leo S. Bing and Alexander Bing – announced that they had quietly acquired 75 small lots and old buildings largely around Abingdon Square, Sheridan Square and Jackson Square Park, on Horatio, West Twelfth and Christopher Streets, sufficient to build five high-end residential buildings in a concerted effort to "recreate" the Greenwich Village neighborhood. In addition to 2 Horatio Street, the project would result in 299 West 12th Street, 59 West 12th Street, 302 West 12th Street, and 45 Christopher Street.

Although Bing & Bing had built many residences on the Upper West and Upper East Sides, this project was their first major venture this far downtown. According to a 1985 article in The New York Times, the firm's structures were "regarded as among the city's finest prewar properties ... [Bing & Bing] built hotels and apartments at a time when luxurious in New York was still synonymous with spacious."

The firm hoped to take advantage of some of the amenities which would make the western part of Greenwich Village a more desirable place to live, including the coming Eighth Avenue Subway, the recent completion of the West Side Elevated Highway, and easy access to the Holland Tunnel.

Leo Bing said in the firm's announcement that the goal of the project was to "recreate the entire district as a modern counterpart of the high-class residential section it once was", saying that it would "rival Central Park West and the fashionable east side within a few years." He cited the goal of neighborhood reinvention as the reason for the simultaneous building, saying his hope was that "complete transformation of the section may be achieved as quickly as possible".

Seven months after the announcement that the land had been bought and that clearing and construction would commence, the Wall Street crash of 1929 occurred on October 29.

== Architect ==
For 2 Horatio Street, Bing & Bing chose architect Robert T. Lyons, who they had just worked with on the Gramercy Park Hotel, which had opened in 1925. The Bing brothers and Lyons also partnered on what was then a major technological breakthrough – creating the world's tallest apartment building – 17 stories – at 903 Park Avenue, which was completed in 1916.

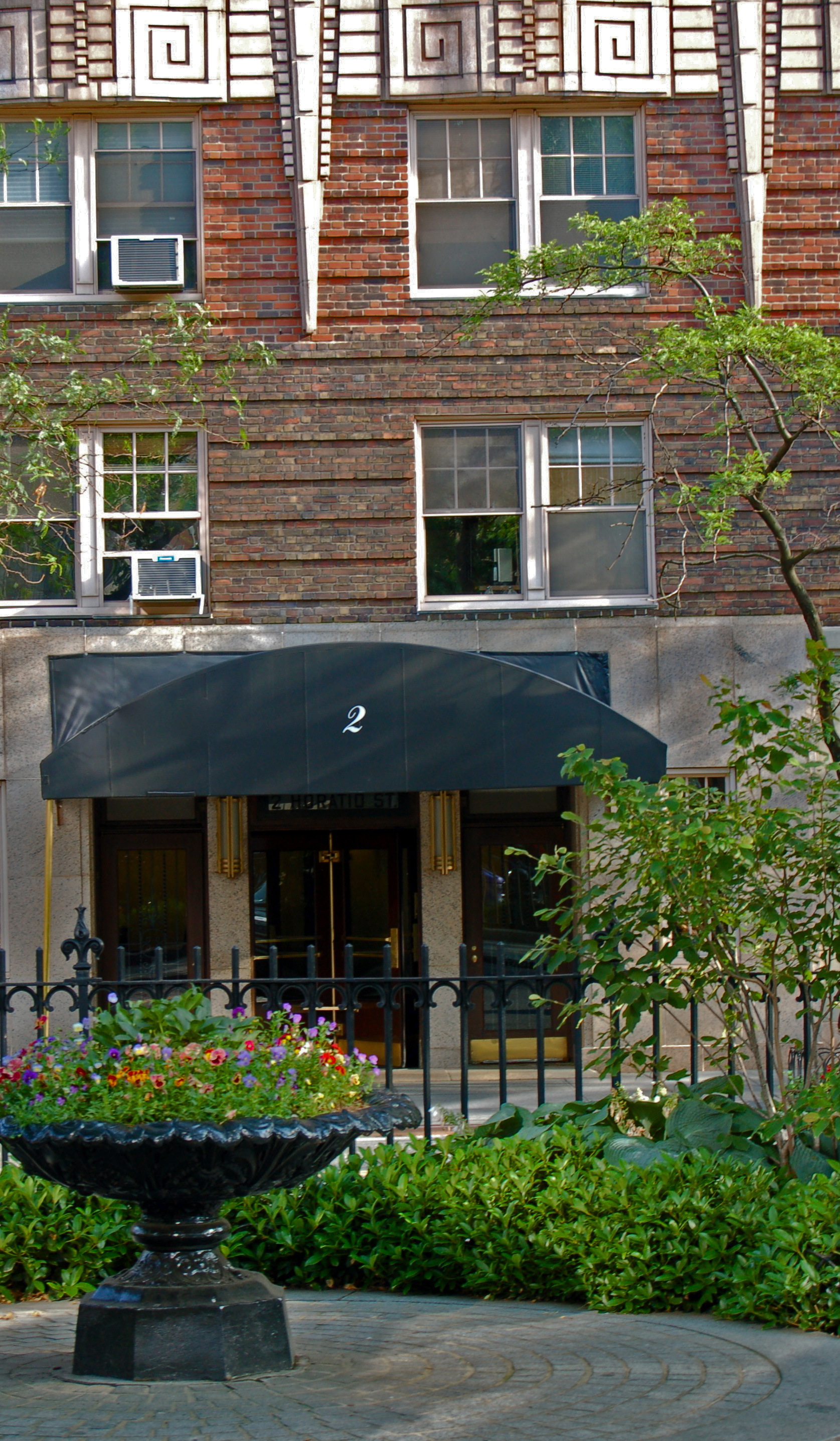
Entrance as seen from Jackson Square Park

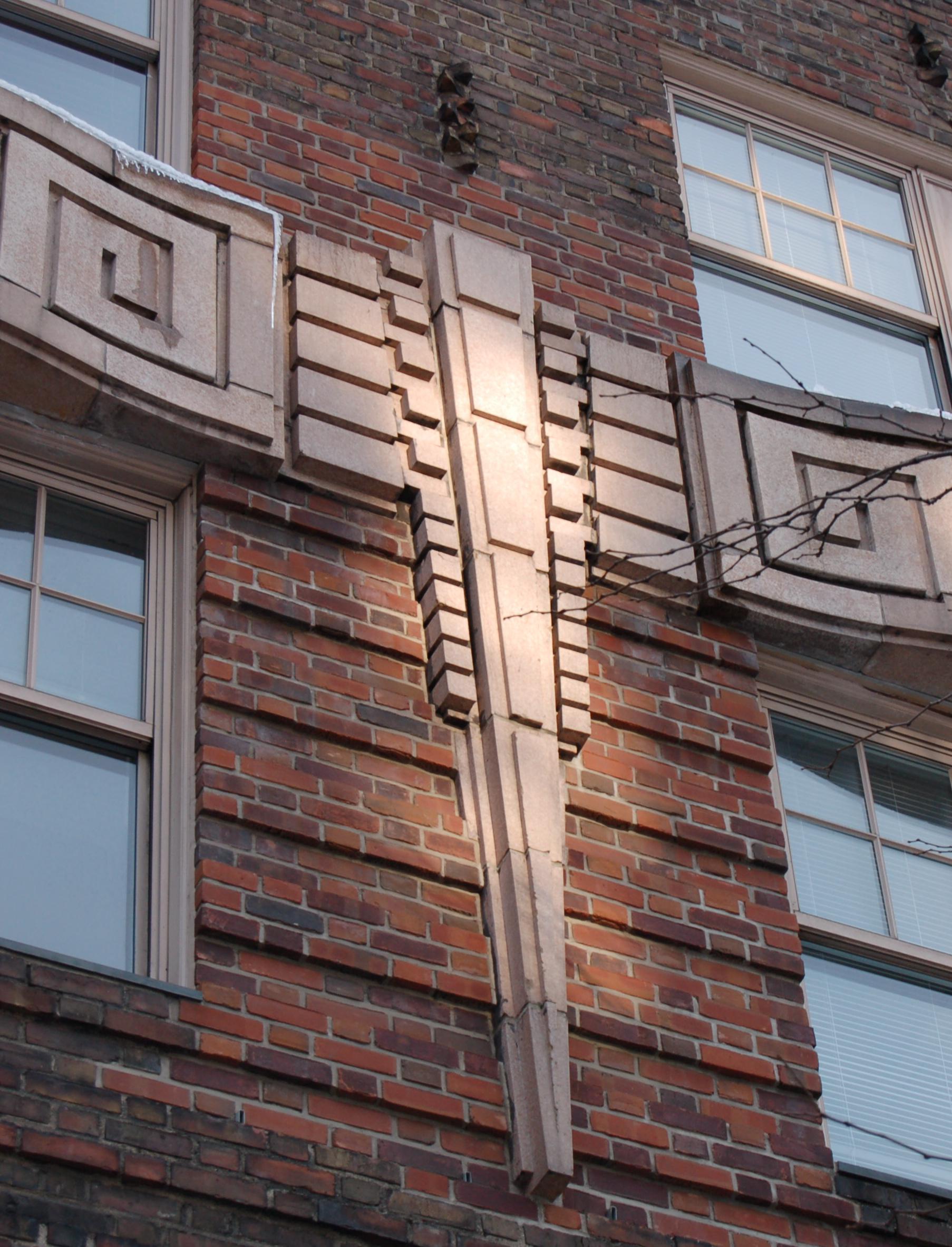
Exterior motif

Lyons worked in New York between 1891 and 1931, mostly hotels or residential buildings but with a few commercial buildings as well. Many of them are located on Park Avenue, but other areas include the Upper West Side and Midtown. A notable project designed by Lyons was the "St. Urban" apartment building on Central Park West at 89th Street, which opened in 1906.

== Architecture and interior ==
2 Horatio Street is rendered in red and brown brick. It has Art Deco references that include four horizontal, terra cotta decorations using greek key motifs at the fourth and sixteenth floors and circle-in-square motifs at the cornice. Overall, the building is not interestingly ornamented, the primary features being rusticated bricks at the corners and balconies under the 15th floor windows. In addition, the penthouse has a tower with terra cotta ornamentation.

1931 promotional material for 2 Horatio Street declared, "In every case the living room is large and beautifully proportioned and has a wood-burning fireplace. The wide expanse of unbroken wall space permits the expression of your individuality in furnishing." Special features cited were "oversize rooms, immense closets, dining foyers, dressing rooms, ornamental railings and RCA radio outlets ..."

== Rentals ==
As the opening of 2 Horatio Street and other four buildings of the Bing & Bing project approached, there were reports that the developers were having difficulty finding tenants. The headline of a New York Times article about the five buildings said: "Tall Apartments in Village Center / Opening This Fall / Presents Rental Problem / Situation Unprecedented." Quoted in the same article, Bing & Bing reported that the "five new buildings on Christopher, Horatio and West Twelfth Streets are proving among the most popular of all the Bing & Bing apartment properties. Callers have been numerous...and a high percentage of the space has been leased."

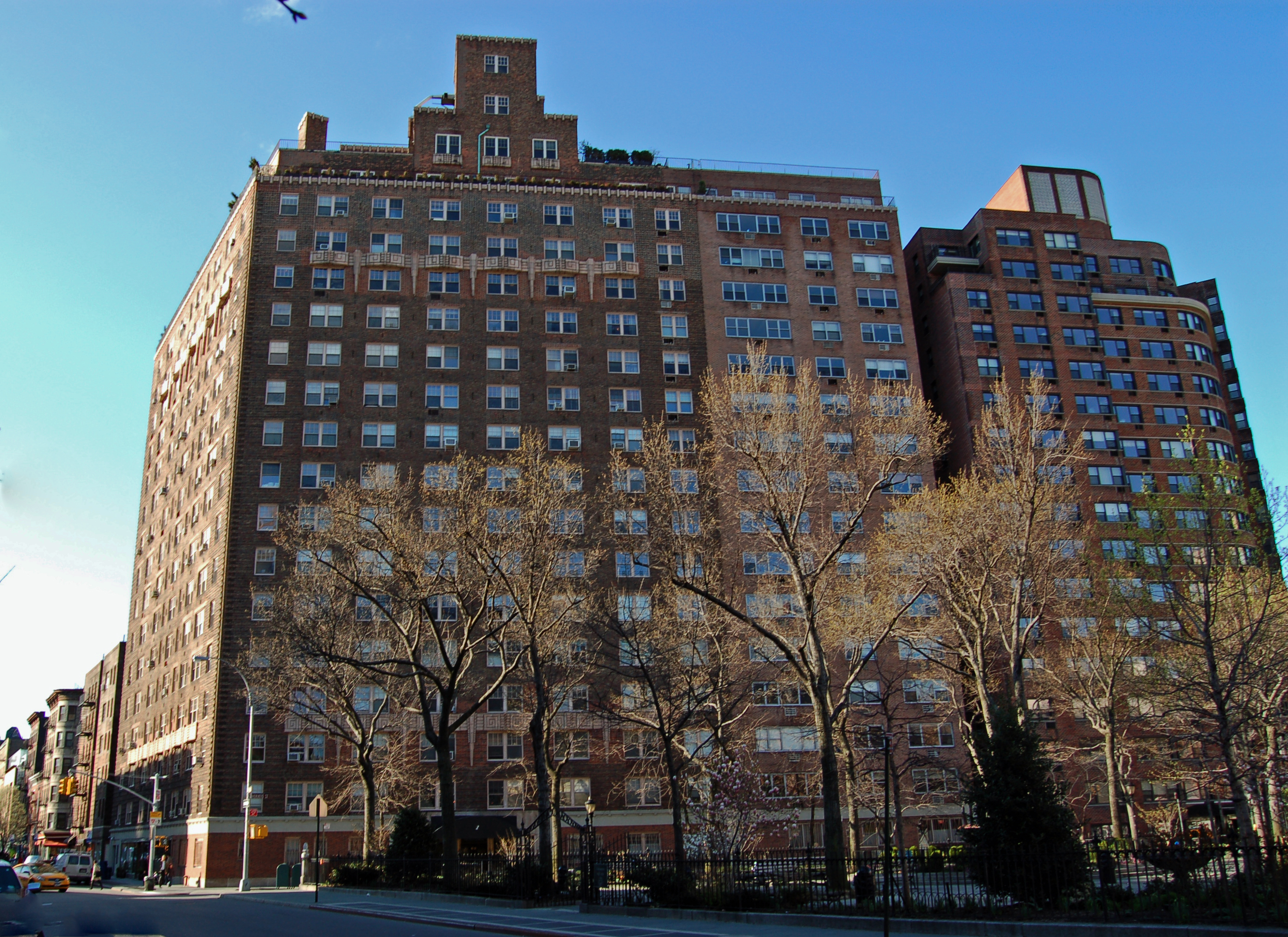
2 Horatio Street (left) and 54 Eighth Avenue (right)

The building was sold by Bing & Bing in 1985, and became cooperative apartments in 1987.

== Criticism ==
Concerning the two massive apartment buildings which sit next to each other, at 2 Horatio Street and 54 Eighth Avenue (also known as 14 Horatio Street), the latter built in 1959, the New York City Landmarks Preservation Commission commented that "[I]t is not at once evident that they defy their neighbors ... Conspicuous from the park, they might well have been designed in better character with the houses in the surrounding blocks, had some regulatory body been in existence to give expert guidance."
