= Metro Theater (New York City) =

Former movie theater in Manhattan, New York

- Midtown Theater
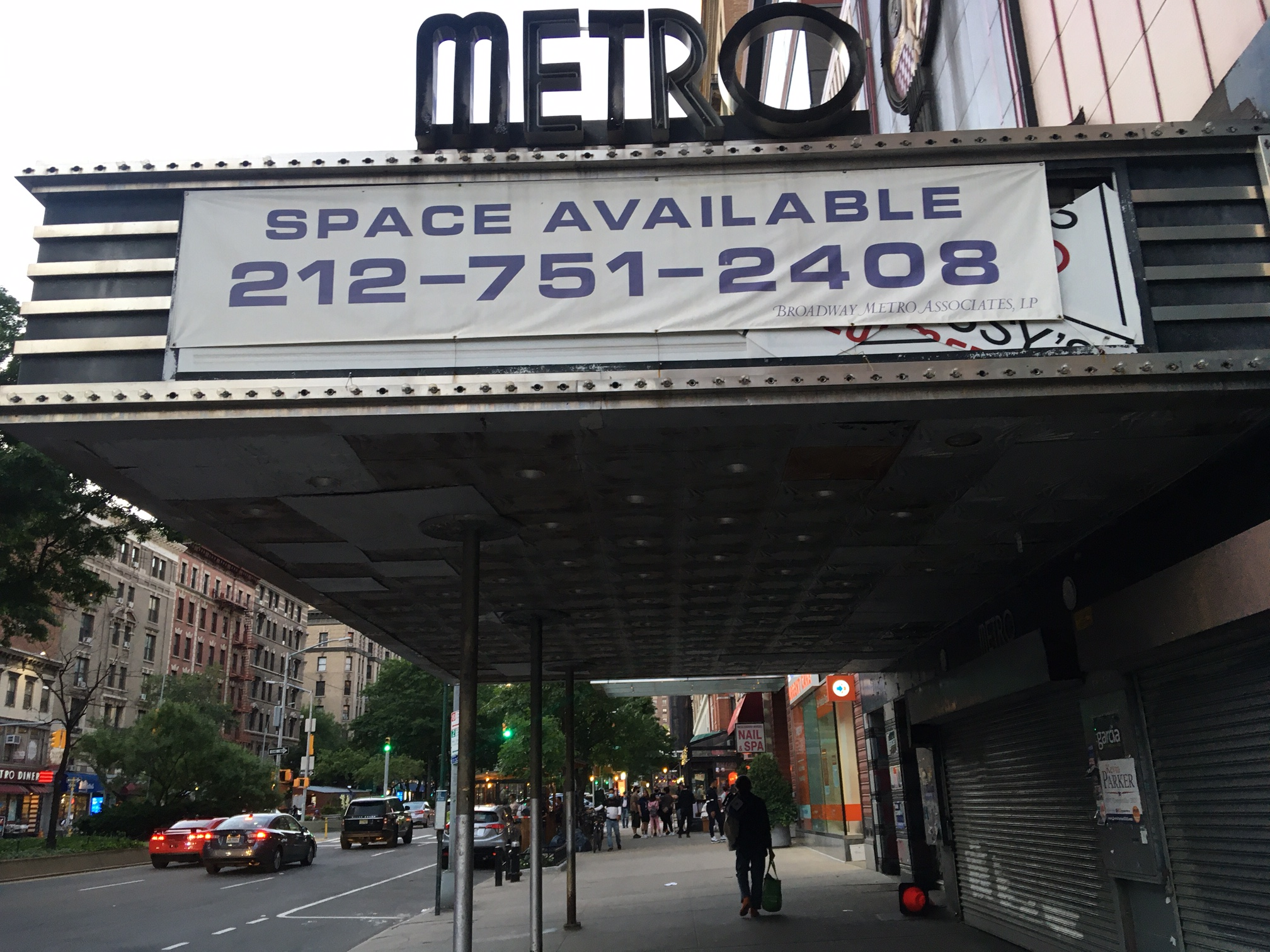
- The Metro has been vacant and gutted since 2006.
- Interactive map of Metro Theater
- Address: 2626 Broadway; Manhattan, New York; United States
- Coordinates: 40°47′48.3″N 73°58′11.5″W
- Owner: Upper West Side Cinema Center
- Capacity: 550 (originally); 292 upper auditorium, 188 lower auditorium (before closure)
- Type: Former movie theater
- Current use: Vacant

Construction
- Opened: June 2, 1933
- Closed: November 2005
- Rebuilt: 1986 (as duplex)
- Years active: 1933–2005
- Architect: Boak & Paris

Site notes
- Architectural style: Art Deco

New York City Landmark
- Designated: July 11, 1989
- Reference no.: 1710
- Designated entity: Facade

The Metro Theater (formerly the Midtown Theater and Embassy's New Metro Twin) is a defunct movie theater at 2626 Broadway on the Upper West Side of Manhattan in New York City. It was designed by architecture firm Boak and Paris and built between 1932 and 1933. The theater is designed in the Art Deco style and originally contained 550 seats. Although the theater's interior was demolished after it was closed in 2005, the original facade remains intact and is a New York City designated landmark.

The Metro Theater's facade on Broadway is about three and a half stories tall. The ground story contains an entrance, storefront windows, and ticket windows. Above the theater's main entrance is a marquee, which spans most of the theater's frontage and extends almost to the curb. The upper portion of the facade is made of terracotta and is divided vertically into three sections; the central section includes a decorative polychromed medallion. The main auditorium originally contained a proscenium arch with niches containing statues. Originally a single auditorium, the interior had been split into two auditoriums by the early 2000s before it was demolished.

A.C. and H.M. Hall acquired an apartment building at 2626 Broadway in 1931 and replaced it with the Midtown Theater, which opened on June 2, 1933. The theater presented first-run films until the 1950s, when it began to show art-house films. The Midtown operated as a porn theater in the 1970s and early 1980s. Dan Talbot acquired the lease to the theater in 1982 and began screening films in repertory, splitting the theater into two auditoriums in 1986. Cineplex assumed the theater's lease in 1987 and sold it to Cablevision, parent company of Clearview Cinemas, in 1998. After a 2004 renovation by Peter H. Elson, who operated it for a year, the Metro closed permanently in November 2005 and was gutted the next year. Its owner, Albert Bialek, unsuccessfully attempted to lease out the theater in the late 2000s and the 2010s to Urban Outfitters, Wingspan Arts, Alamo Drafthouse Cinema (twice), Planet Fitness, and Blink Fitness. After Bialek died, the Upper West Side Cinema Center bought the theater in 2025.

== Site ==
The Metro Theater, originally the Midtown Theater, is located at 2624–2626 Broadway, on the eastern sidewalk between 99th and 100th Streets, in the Manhattan Valley and Upper West Side neighborhoods of Manhattan in New York City. The land lot covers 5,000 square feet (465 m^{2}) and is rectangular, with a frontage of 50 feet (15 m) on Broadway and a depth of 100 feet (30 m). The Metro Theater abuts St. Michael's Episcopal Church and the New York Public Library's Bloomingdale Library to the east, as well as the Ariel East residential tower to the north. The Columbus Square development is one block to the east of the Metro Theater.

The section of Broadway between 59th and 110th Streets once contained 18 movie theaters, including the Metro. By 1989, only four such theaters remained on Broadway, as these cinemas were generally smaller neighborhood theaters, which struggled to compete with larger multiplex theaters. The Metro was the only remaining movie theater on the Upper West Side stretch of Broadway by the beginning of the 21st century.

== Architecture ==
The Metro Theater was designed in the Art Deco style by Boak & Paris, composed of Russell M. Boak and Hyman F. Paris, who studied under architect Emery Roth. The developer was A.C. and H.M. Hall. Although the theater's facade largely contains vertically oriented decorations, there are some horizontal design elements on the theater's marquee and outermost doorways, which may be an allusion to the Streamline Moderne style.

=== Facade ===
The only visible facade of the Metro Theater is the primary facade on Broadway, which is about three and a half stories tall. It is divided into the ground floor entrance and the glazed-terracotta upper section. The theater's facade uses rose-colored and black terracotta, an inexpensive decorative element at the time of the Metro's construction, when funding was scarce. The ground story contains a black terracotta frame, which surrounded three glass double doors. The original ticket window was outside the theater. When the theater opened, there were two glass doors left of this entrance, which were replaced when the ticket window was moved inside in 1954. There was an aluminum-and-glass storefront, with a display window and doorway, right of the entrance. The outermost portion of the ground story contains aluminum doors with vertical grooves, flanked by horizontal gray and black bands.

Above the theater's main entrance is the marquee, which spans most of the theater's frontage and extends almost to the curb. The marquee is made of metal and is suspended from the upper facade via eyebars. A series of four horizontal chrome bands wrap around the north, west, and south faces of the marquee. Similar to the Variety Theater, Boak & Paris used lights on the underside of the marquee. When the theater was built, there were 200 lights on the marquee's underside, but this was reduced to 22 lights by the late 1980s. Above the north and south faces of the marquee are red neon letters spelling "Metro" in Art Deco-style letters, which were installed when the theater was renamed in 1982. There are black terracotta blocks on the facade on either side of the marquee.

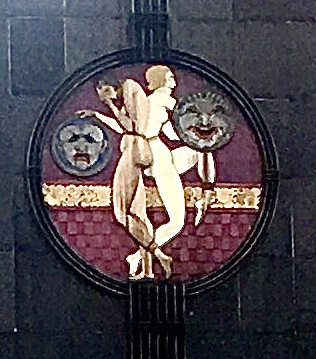
The comedy and tragedy medallion signals the use of the building.

The upper portion of the facade is made of terracotta and is divided vertically into three sections. The outer sections are variously described as being pink or "rosy beige" in color. Maroon bands divide the outer sections of the facade into L-shaped segments. The central part of the upper facade is demarcated by black pilasters with maroon borders on either side, which protrude from the wall and curve above the roofline. The middle of the central section contains vertical aluminum bars, which taper in a triangular pattern above the roofline. These bars are interrupted by a polychromed medallion with masks symbolizing comedy and tragedy. The medallion has a lavender background and a horizontal yellow band with two off-white or beige figures, which appear to be holding blue and gray masks. This medallion is similar in design to Hildreth Meière's plaques on the facade of Radio City Music Hall, but Meière most likely did not create the theater's medallion. There is a maroon coping at the top of the facade; the coping above the outer sections of the facade is flat, while the coping above the center section is wavy.

=== Interior ===
When the Metro Theater was in operation, its lobby was decorated with red glass-block columns. The theater originally contained 550 seats, split across two levels in a stadium seating layout. seating arrangement was changed multiple times over the years and was split into two screens in 1986: a 200-seat upper auditorium and a 325-seat lower auditorium. Toward the end of its original run in 2004, the upper auditorium contained 292 seats, while the lower auditorium contained 188 seats. The proscenium arch, at the front of the theater, was flanked by niches containing statues of nude women holding glowing dishes. These niches also contained grilles. A band of floral ornament ran across the ceiling and side walls. The aisles were illuminated by lights in a fan pattern.

The entire interior was completely demolished in 2006. The modern-day theater building contains 10,270 square feet (954 m^{2}) of usable space on two above-ground stories. The basement covers 5,000 square feet (460 m^{2}) and has 13-foot (4.0 m) ceilings.

== History ==
=== Development ===
Large movie palaces became common in the 1920s between the end of World War I and the beginning of the Great Depression. In the New York City area, these movie palaces often had between 2,000 and 6,000 seats. The onset of the Depression forced many theatrical operators in New York City to build smaller theaters with between 500 and 1,000 seats. As such, most of New York City's Art Deco-style theaters, built during this time period, were small-scale cinemas serving local neighborhoods.

Just prior to the construction of what became the Midtown Theater, the site at 2624–2626 Broadway was occupied by a seven-story apartment building, which the Welton estate sold to Irving I. Lewine in November 1930. Lewine initially intended to build another structure on the site. The A. C. and H. M. Hall Realty Company bought the vacant apartment building in June 1931, with plans to replace it with a two-story commercial structure. By that November, the site had been cleared. Boak and Paris had finalized plans for a small theater in December 1932, and Hall Realty received a building permit for the theater the next month. Brohall Realty, led by Arlington C. Hall, leased the theater to Lee A. Ochs of Midway Theatre Inc. for 21 years beginning in March 1933, with annual rent that would gradually increase from $17,500 to $22,500. J. J. Secoles was the theater's general contractor.

=== Operation ===
==== Early years ====
The Midtown Theater opened on June 2, 1933, and received its certificate of occupancy five days later. Despite its name, the theater was on the Upper West Side and was not near Midtown Manhattan. From its opening through the 1940s, the theater presented first-run films, namely films that had just been released by movie studios. Among the films screened at the Midtown were Goose Step, The Seventh Veil, and Moonlight Sonata, as well as revivals of films such as The Scoundrel and Catherine the Great. The theater's developer, Hall Realty, owned the theater until the 1940s, after which it was sold several times. Crain's New York magazine wrote that the Midtown "showed Marx Brothers comedies and romances starring Cary Grant and Katharine Hepburn" at the peak of its popularity. The Midtown Theater switched to showing foreign films in December 1948, starting with the French film Secrets of a Ballerina.

During the 1950s, the Midtown hosted foreign films such as The Blue Angel, Jofroi, and A Day In The Country. The theater also presented art-house films by directors such as Jean-Luc Godard, Louis Buñuel and Roman Polanski during the 1950s and 1960s. By the early 1970s, the Midtown had begun to show pornographic films, a use that continued well into the next decade. A New York Times reporter said that the theater's conversion into a porn theater of one of many "signs for the optimist and for the pessimist" in the immediate surrounding area. At the time, the stretch of Broadway between 96th and 110th Streets had experienced significant social decline and contained numerous single room occupancy buildings.

==== Late 20th century ====
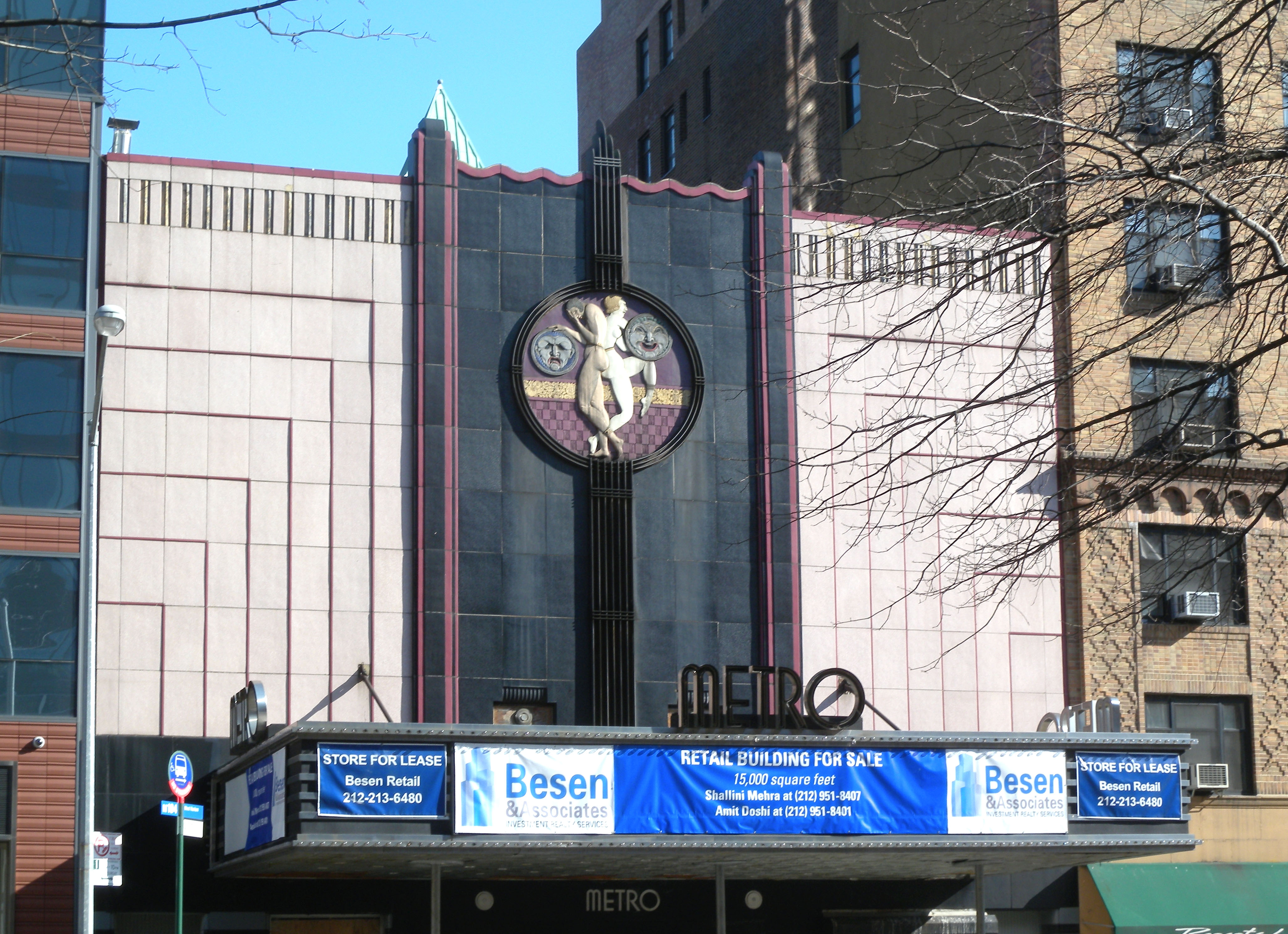
The Metro Theater as seen from across Broadway

Dan Talbot, an operator of multiple cinemas on the Upper West Side, acquired the Midtown Theater in August 1982 and stopped showing porn movies there. The Midtown was instead renovated for $300,000 and began to host foreign films in a repertory format. The Midtown reopened as the Metro on October 1, 1982; its first foreign films were a double bill of the films Aguirre, the Wrath of God and Ali: Fear Eats the Soul. The renovated Metro Theater had 535 seats, making it the largest repertory theater in Manhattan, as well as one of the largest theaters in the borough that exclusively showed revivals of old films. After the renovation, Vincent Canby of The New York Times wrote: "The seats are comfortable and the long, comparatively narrow auditorium is such that I don't think it will ever be possible for anyone to 'twin it'" (i.e. convert the Metro into a two-screen theater). The theater began to host events such as Perspectives on French Cinema, an annual showcase of ten French films. The Metro's repertory programming was popular, and a Times article in 1984 said the Metro's audiences were "perhaps, the most serious and best behaved in the city".

Talbot began to show first-run films at the Metro in June 1985. The change in format was variously attributed to the closure of the nearby New Yorker Theater, the growing popularity of newer movies, and the fact that the theater re-ran old films too frequently. To attract patrons, Talbot added a screen and speakers to the Metro's storefront so passersby could watch. Talbot received hundreds of letters criticizing the first-run format and, after six months, changed the Metro back to a repertory theater. Despite the increasing prevalence of videocassette recorders in the 1980s, Talbot was optimistic that "something like video ultimately isn't going to deter people from going to places like the Metro". Talbot had closed the Metro by mid-1986 to replace the theater's bathrooms and heating, ventilation, and air conditioning systems. The Metro's lease was not set to expire for 75 years, amid concerns that movie theaters along Broadway could be replaced with new development. By that year, the New York City Landmarks Preservation Commission (LPC) was considering designating the Metro Theater as a city landmark. The interior was split into two screens around the same time.

Cineplex Odeon assumed the theater's lease in 1987, and it acquired several other theaters nearby. Cineplex Odeon failed to apply for an operating license for the Metro, leading city officials to close it temporarily in May 1989. The LPC designated the Metro Theater as an individual landmark that July. Albert Bialek bought the theater the same year, although Cineplex Odeon continued to operate it. The Metro was known as the Cineplex Odeon Metro Twin by the early 1990s. Under Cineplex Odeon's operation, the Metro Twin sold cheaper tickets than comparable New York City cinemas that also screened first-run films. After Cineplex Odeon merged with Loews Theaters in 1998 to form Loews Cineplex Entertainment, the combined firm announced that April that it would sell 14 movie theaters in Manhattan, including the Metro Theater, to comply with antitrust law. Cablevision, parent company of Clearview Cinemas, bought the Metro in August 1998.

==== Final years ====
By the beginning of the 21st century, the theater building was owned by Broadway Metro Associates, which was headed by Albert Bialek. The Metro was managed by Clearview Cinemas until it closed on January 26, 2003, amid a dispute between Clearview and Bialek. The theater was known for its seats with sharp springs, as well as its extremely dirty screens. There were rumors that the theater would be converted into a Gristedes supermarket, prompting over 100 local residents to express concerns. During late 2004, local residents protested the closure so vehemently that Gristedes CEO John Catsimatidis printed leaflets denying his company's involvement in the theater. Two additional theaters on Broadway in Upper Manhattan had also closed in recent months; according to The New York Times, this "left a 10-mile swath of Broadway from 84th Street to Yonkers without a first-run movie theater for the first time in decades". Bialek said in September 2004 that he had leased the Metro to cinema operator Peter H. Elson.

Elson renovated the theater for $240,000 and reopened it in November 2004 as the Embassy's New Metro Twin, showing indie and foreign films there. The modifications included new seats, lighting, carpets, projectors, and sound equipment, as well as larger screens. The change in format failed to attract patrons, even though the theater had lower ticket and concession prices than comparable cinemas showing mainstream films. By September 2005, Elson said of the local community: "They want to have a theater, but they don't want to support it." The New Metro Twin closed again in November 2005. Various reasons were cited for its closure, among which (according to The Real Deal magazine) observers had cited construction noise from two neighboring apartment buildings, as well as the Metro's tendency to screen limited releases of foreign films. The theater's closure was so little noticed that construction workers at the neighboring buildings were unaware that the theater had closed until a New York Times reporter told them two months afterward. The Times wrote that the theater had "experienced more cliffhangers than the legendary silent The Perils of Pauline".

=== Post-closure ===
==== 2000s ====
In 2006, the interior of the theater was gutted, as only the exterior was protected as a landmark. David Dunlap, writing for The New York Times in 2007, said the theater's auditorium had been demolished, saying: "Gone are seats and plaster and curtains and screen. Gone is a golden ceiling molding with a chain of floral bouquets. Gone are the sylph-filled niches. Gone is grille work that sprouted like corn stalks." The Metro's owners Albert and Sheila Bialek had leased the theater for 49 years to John R. Souto, who was supposed to have renovated the theater for retail purposes. The terms of Souto's lease also included an option to buy the theater outright at a later date. The LPC issued a "certificate of no effect" in October 2007, allowing interior demolition. By 2008, Souto had hired Winick Realty Group to lease the theater's interior, and he also hired Eastern Consolidated to sell the theater. To avoid confusing potential tenants, Winick Realty took down its own signs when the building was placed for sale in March 2008, even though Eastern Consolidated wanted a tenant, as it would increase the probability that the theater would be sold.

The structure's small floor area made it very difficult to lease out for theatrical use. The owners could not construct any more above-ground space because they had sold the theater's air rights, which would have permitted the construction of additional floor area, to a neighboring landowner. Additionally, the facade could not be modified because of landmark regulations, and the structure's protruding marquee created a large shadow that deterred potential tenants. Eastern Consolidated attempted to auction off the theater building in March 2008, expecting to receive between $20 million and $25 million, but it did not receive any bids within that range. Winick Realty Group tentatively agreed to lease the theater to Urban Outfitters by January 2009. Winick Realty's president Benjamin Fox said Urban Outfitters " fell in love with this place because of its uniqueness", but Ted Marlowe, the CEO of Urban Outfitters, said the gutted Metro was "not the easiest space to work with". Urban Outfitters ultimately leased a store across the street because the company did not want to spend money renovating the Metro.

==== 2010s ====
Souto filed for Chapter 11 bankruptcy protection in September 2010 after defaulting on his lease. A local political strategist, Michael Oliva, established the Metro Theater Project in late 2010 in an effort to convert the theater building to a community center. Oliva estimated that it would cost $10 million to buy the theater and $2 million to $4 million to renovate it; by December 2010, he had raised $2,000. After Albert Bialek took over the theater building in January 2011, he wished to lease the Metro to a single tenant to "maintain [its] integrity". Bialek also commissioned feasibility studies on the possibility of converting the building into a cinema or performing-arts complex with three or four screens. In March 2011, Bialek began negotiating to lease the theater to nonprofit organization Wingspan Arts. The proposal would have included expanding the floor area into 30,000 square feet (2,800 m^{2}) by excavating 30 to 35 feet (9.1 to 10.7 m) below ground. This would have created space for 12 rehearsal rooms, four auditoriums, a cafe, and about 3,000 square feet (280 m^{2}) of office space. Wingspan ultimately decided against moving to the Metro.

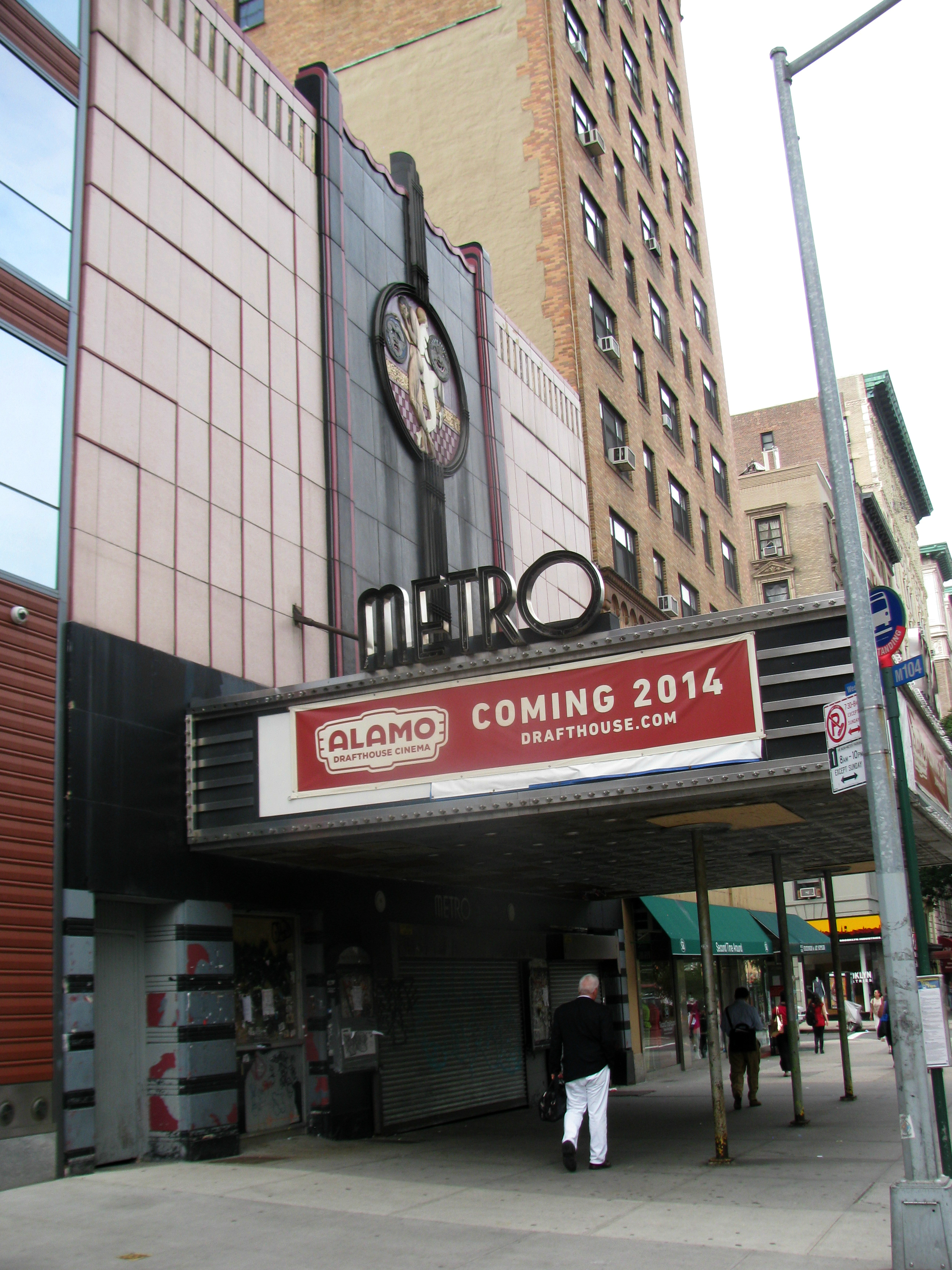
The Metro Theater in 2012, when Alamo Drafthouse first considered renovating the theater

Bialek filed plans with the New York City Department of Buildings (DOB) in late 2011 to renovate the theater building into a store at a cost of $900,000. Movie theater chain Alamo Drafthouse announced in April 2012 that it would open its first New York City cinema within the Metro Theater. This announcement followed the passage of a law allowing some cinemas in the state of New York to serve alcohol. Alamo Drafthouse planned to renovate the facade and convert the interior into a five-screen multiplex with a kitchen to serve dinners to patrons. The five screens would have contained a combined 378 seats. Manhattan Community Board 7 supported the plan; its chairman said, "This could very well be a destination kind of attraction both for this neighborhood and elsewhere". Some construction work had taken place by early 2013, and local blog West Side Rag had interviewed Alamo Drafthouse's CEO in advance of the planned conversion. Alamo Drafthouse canceled its plans to renovate the Metro Theater in October 2013, citing high costs and the effects of Hurricane Sandy in New York; they instead opened a location in Downtown Brooklyn.

After the failure of the Alamo Drafthouse plan, Bialek spent more than a year negotiating to lease the theater to Planet Fitness. The chain had indicated its intention to lease the space in early 2015, but the lease negotiations fell through just before Planet Fitness was supposed to lease the space. Planet Fitness then announced in October 2015 that it had leased the building for 15 years. Renovation architects Stelco Restoration and Technology filed renovation plans for the Metro Theater in March 2016. By that November, Planet Fitness had withdrawn from the project, and Blink Fitness had indicated that it would lease the building instead. The Blink Fitness plan also did not proceed. In 2018, a local resident raised $4,000 through GoFundMe to study a possible restoration of the theater. The resident returned the donors' money the next year, as there was not enough funding to pay for an engineer's appraisal. By then, Bialek said he was prepared to lease the building to a nonprofit. Residents, who were upset that multiple plans for the Metro had fallen through, claimed that Bialek was "greedy and unreliable".

==== 2020s ====
Bialek filed revised plans with the DOB in June 2020, which called for the renovation of the Metro Theater into a retail space. The DOB rejected the plans, which would have added 10,000 square feet (930 m^{2}) at a cost of $1.2 million. In 2021, local residents formed a group known as the Friends of Metro Theater to advocate for the restoration of the Metro. The group launched a petition on Change.org to advocate for the theater's restoration; by November 2021, the petition had received 3,000 signatures. At the time, Bialek indicated that he was in the process of leasing the theater building to another tenant. Bialek announced in March 2022 that he had leased the theater to an unspecified theatrical chain. Media sources indicated that the Metro had been sold to a California-based company and would become a dine-in theater.

In September 2022, Alamo Drafthouse announced that it would reopen the Metro as a dinner theater. According to Alamo Drafthouse founder Tim League, the renovation would be "largely funded by Alamo, we're trying to establish a little bit higher-end brand. Alamo is pizza and salads, Metro will have some of those, but will also have more full entrees, a really nice wine list, and a small bar." The same month, Alamo Drafthouse applied for a liquor license for the theater. Officials approved renovations to the building in August 2023, and the theater received a liquor license shortly afterward. Bialek died in late 2023, and plans for the Alamo Drafthouse location at the Metro Theater were canceled in April 2024. Manhattan Borough President Mark Levine cited Alamo Drafthouse's financial troubles, a claim that an Alamo Drafthouse spokesperson denied.

Ira Deutchman and Adeline Monzier established the Upper West Side Cinema Center in July 2024 in an attempt to buy the Metro Theater. The Cinema Center's proposal included a three-story theater with five screens, an education/community center, and a cafe. Celebrities such as Ethan Hawke, Martin Scorsese, and John Turturro endorsed the Cinema Center's plan. In September 2024, the Cinema Center offered to buy the theater from the Bialek family for $6.9 million; the purchase was contingent on the group's ability to raise the funds in a timely manner. The Cinema Center finalized its purchase in April 2025 after raising $6.9 million, which included $3.5 million from New York governor Kathy Hochul's office and $500,000 from the New York State Senate. That October, Deutchman announced that the theater would be rebranded the Uptown Film Center and that he would raise $29 million, seeking to begin construction by 2027. The plans included splitting the Metro into five auditoriums and restoring its original appearance.

== Impact ==
When the Metro Theater was being considered for landmark designation in 1986, David W. Dunlap of The New York Times wrote that the theater "makes a startling impression with its streamlined facade in beige, black, red and lavender and its circular medallion containing allegorical figures of comedy and tragedy". The same year, Newsday wrote that the theater was "the architectural king" of art-house movie theaters, characterizing it as "Art Deco restored with a vengeance". Robert A. M. Stern wrote in his 1987 book New York 1930 that the theater was "stylishly Modernist", while Andrew Dolkart wrote in 2012 that "the Art Deco Midtown has one of the finest theater facades in New York". The Real Deal magazine wrote in 2021 that "the theater's tri-colored, terra cotta facade is 'one of the finest facades of its type', according to city historians."

The Metro appeared in the Woody Allen film Hannah and Her Sisters in 1986, and it has also appeared in a video for Janet Jackson's 1987 release, "Let's Wait Awhile".

== See also ==
- Art Deco architecture of New York City
- List of buildings and structures on Broadway in Manhattan
- List of New York City Designated Landmarks in Manhattan from 59th to 110th Streets
