= Boak & Paris =

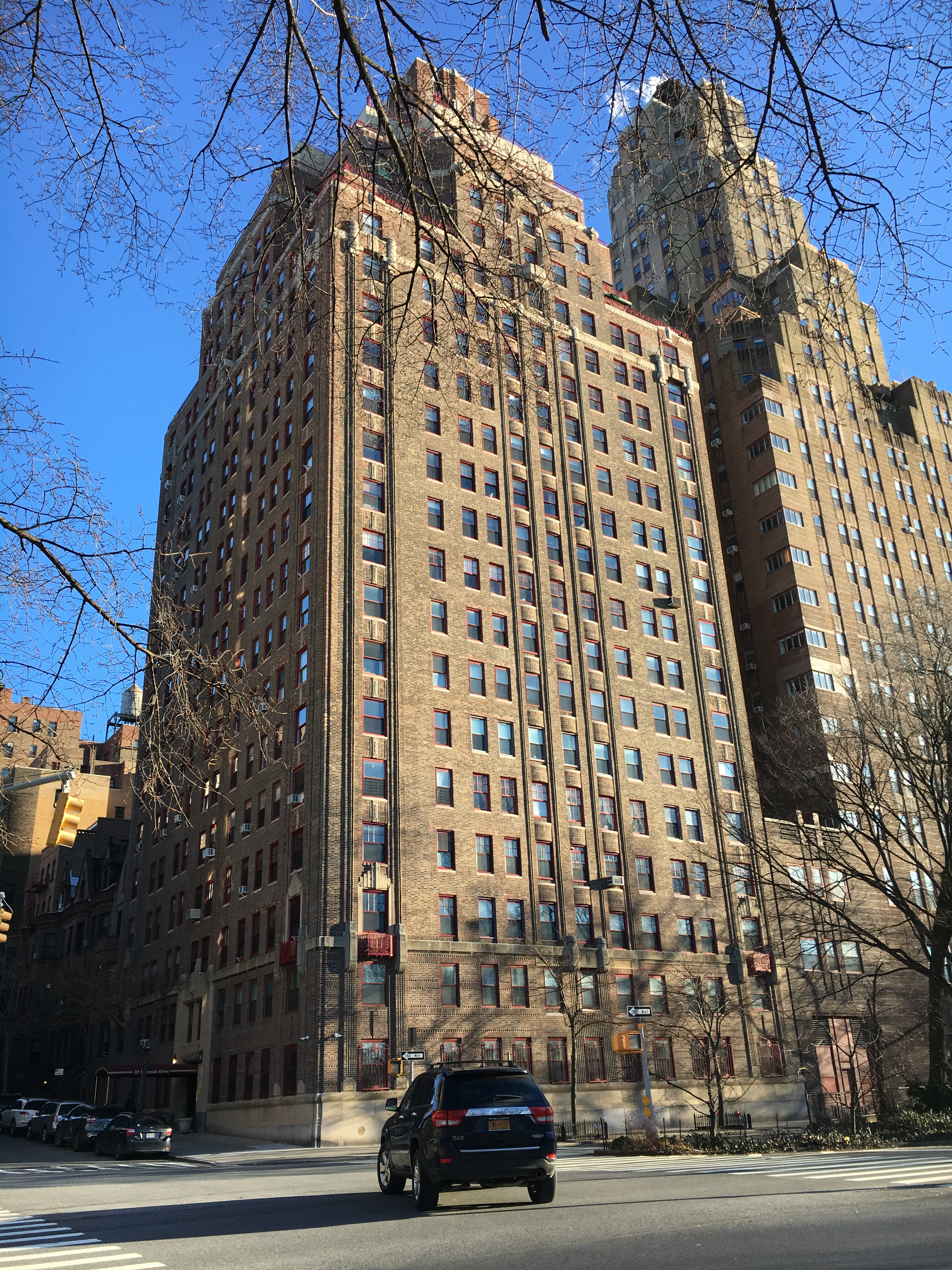
- 315 Riverside Drive, designed by Boak & Paris

Practice information
- Key architects: Russell M. Boak; Hyman F. Paris
- Location: New York City

Boak & Paris was an American architectural firm best known for designing multiple pre-war buildings in Manhattan before and during the Great Depression. It was founded by Russell M. Boak and Hyman F. Paris.

== History ==
Russell M. Boak and Hyman F. Paris were alumni of architect Emery Roth, who had designed pre-war luxury residential buildings such as The San Remo and The El Dorado. Boak and Paris established their own architectural practice in 1927.

== Founders ==
=== Russell M. Boak ===
Russell M. Boak was born on September 25, 1896, in the Bronx, New York. He attended public school and after eighth grade, he started as a draftsman in the office of Emery Roth.

=== Hyman F. Paris ===
Little is known about the early years of Hyman Paris. He was born in Austria. Records indicates that he was not registered as an architect until 1922, and had been employed by George F. Pelham in 1917 and by Emery Roth from 1912 to 1923.

== Buildings ==
Boak & Paris have designed numerous residential buildings that are now landmark or part of a landmark historic district of the City of New York.

- 139 East 94th Street (1928)
- 152 East 94th Street (1937)
- 315 Riverside Drive (1930)
- 450 West End Avenue (1931)
- 45 Christopher Street (1931)
- 302 West 12th Street (1931)
- 336 West End Avenue (1932)
- 2624-2626 Broadway (1933)
- 143 West 72nd Street (1935)
- 5 Riverside Drive (1936)
- 3-11 West 86th Street (1937)
- 100 Riverside Drive (1938)
- 20 Fifth Avenue (1940)
- 333 West 57th Street (1940)

== Bibliography ==
- Alt, Annice M. (2014). Boak & Paris / Boak & Raad: New York Architects. Xlibris. ISBN 978-1499054101.
- Betts, Mary Beth (June 23, 2015). Riverside-West End Historic District Extension II Designation Report (PDF). NYC Landmarks Preservation Commission.
