= Bing & Bing =

Real estate developer in New York City

- Type: Private Limited
- Industry: Real estate
- Founders: Leo S. Bing; Alexander M. Bing
- Headquarters: New York City

Bing & Bing was one of the most important apartment real estate developers in New York City in the early 20th century.

The firm was founded by Leo S. Bing (1874–1956) and his brother, Alexander M. Bing (1878–1959). The brothers often worked with the architect Emery Roth on buildings like The Alden, at 82nd Street and Central Park West, and the Southgate complex of apartment houses on the south side of 52nd Street between First Avenue and the East River. In 1985, the heirs of the Bings sold most of their buildings to a partnership led by Martin J. Raynes.

The firm had a reputation for building "stately, spacious apartments in elegantly detailed buildings that often had Art Deco touches." Bing & Bing buildings, all built for the luxury market, often feature multiple setbacks with private terraces. According to The New York Times, "The Bing & Bing buildings are regarded as among the city's finest prewar properties."

== Selected list of buildings ==
=== Upper East Side ===
- 45 East 66th Street – Owned by Bing & Bing from 1928 to 1973, and from 1977 to 1987.
- 903 Park Avenue – When built, the 17-story luxury building at the northeast corner of East 79th Street was said to be the tallest residential building in New York. It was designed by Robert T. Lyons and Warren & Wetmore.
- 565 Park Avenue
- 1000 Park Avenue – The carved figures in medieval clothes are said to represent the Bing brothers.

=== Downtown and Greenwich Village ===
- 59 West 12th Street – Once the home of Jimi Hendrix.

=== Brooklyn ===
- St. George Tower at the Hotel St. George
