= Robert T. Lyons =

American architect (1873–1956)

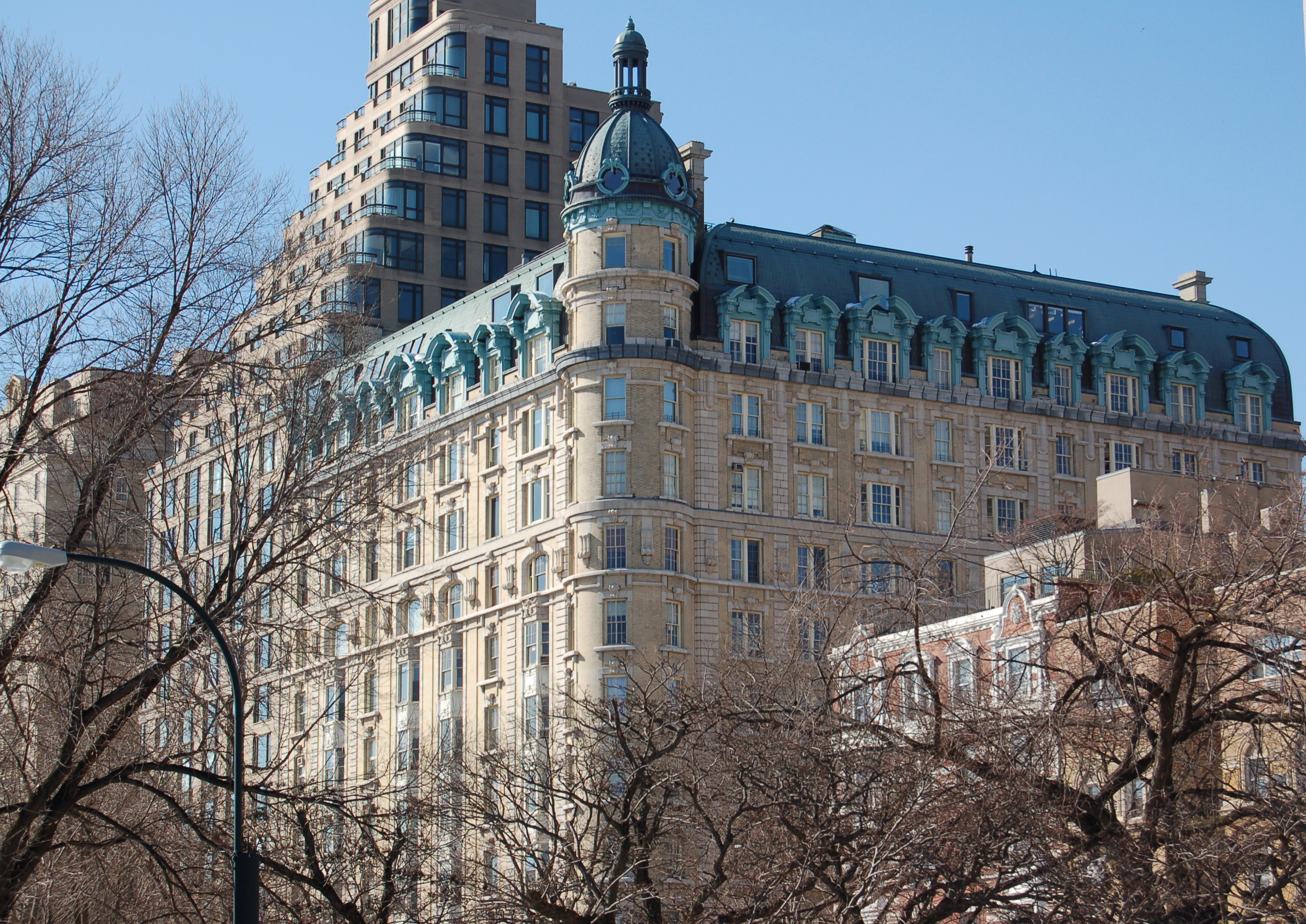
St. Urban Apartments on Central Park West

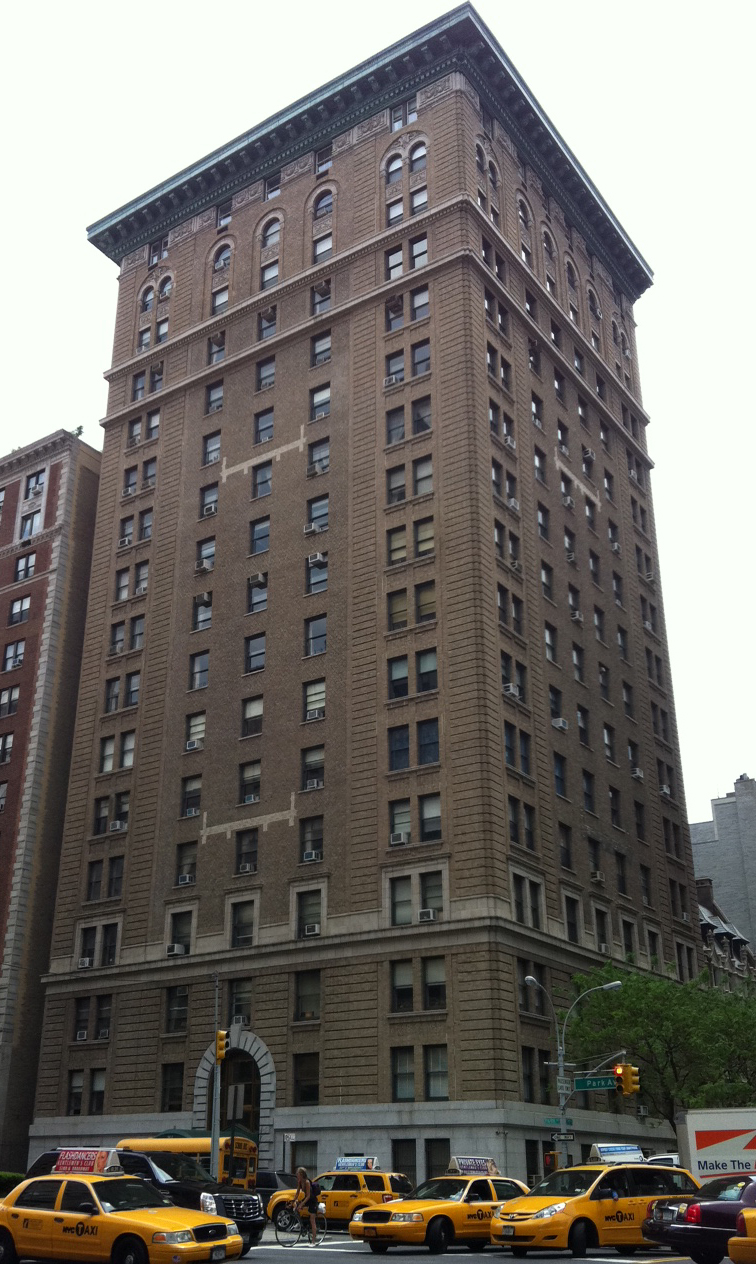
At 17 stories, 903 Park Avenue was the tallest apartment building in the world in 1916

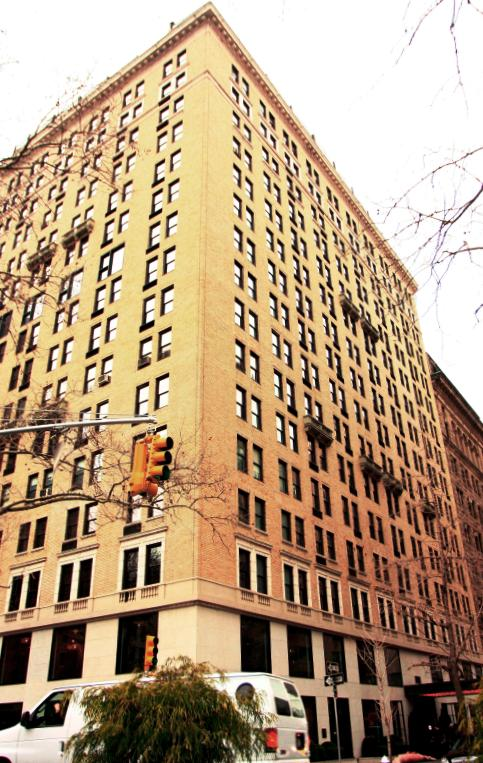
Gramercy Park Hotel, 1925

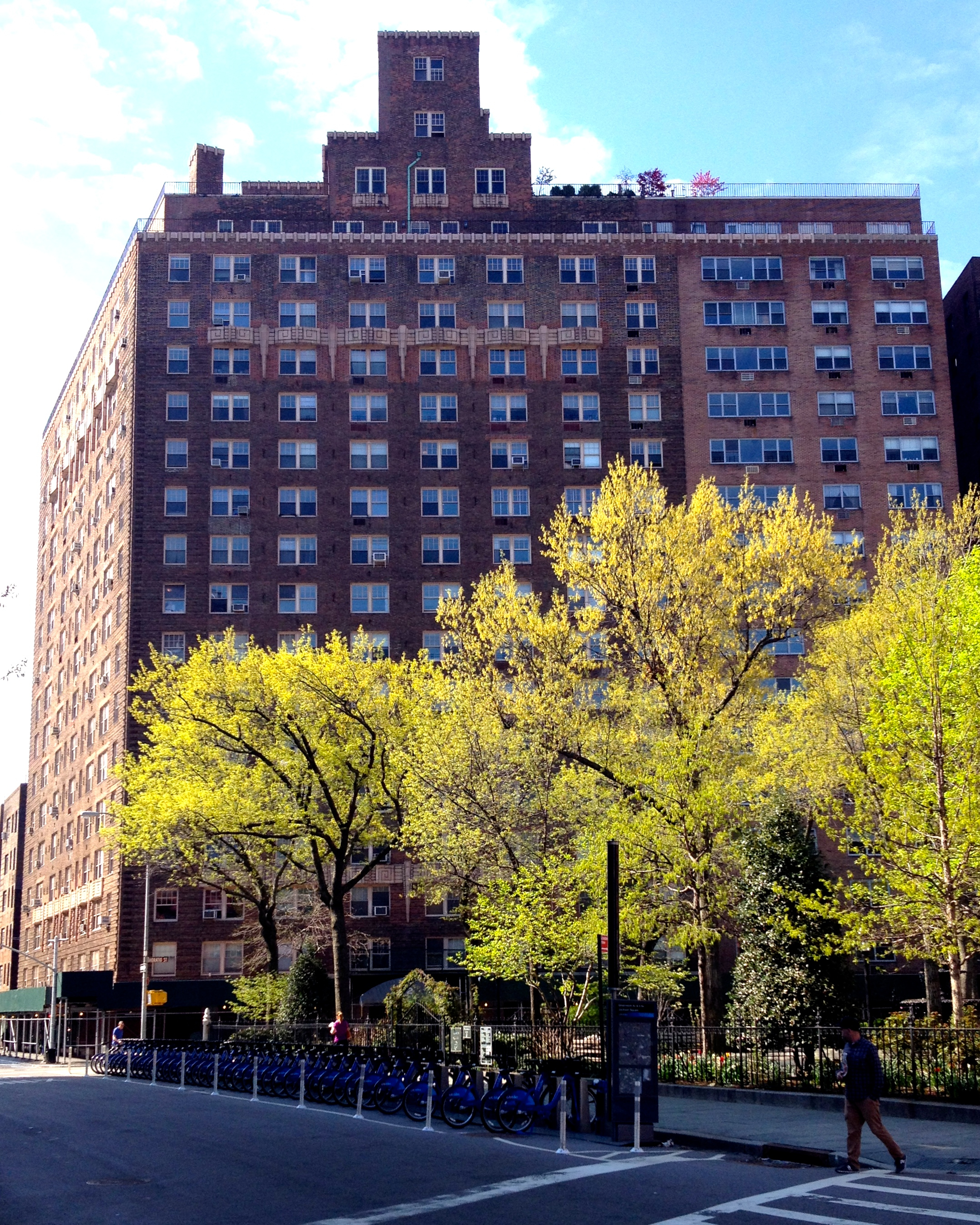
2 Horatio Street, 1931

Robert Timothy Lyons (February 23, 1873 – May 15, 1956) was an architect responsible for many residential and commercial buildings in New York City in the early 20th century. He typically built in a Renaissance Revival or Neo-Federal style.

== Early life ==
Lyons was born in New York on February 23, 1873 and died May 15, 1956 in Trucksville, Pennsylvania.

== Career ==
Emporis, the global real estate data and photo publishing firm, identifies 29 of Lyons's buildings in New York City in some detail—built largely between 1891 and 1931 (listed below). They are virtually all hotels or residential buildings. There are some commercial buildings.

Lyons's notable work from the earlier part of his career includes the “St. Urban” on Central Park West at 89th Street, which opened in 1906, built in partnership with developer Peter Banner.

There is at least one example of Lyons's work in Brooklyn Heights: 11 Schermerhorn Street. Robert T. Lyons was an associate architect to William Van Alen in the preliminary design of the Reynolds Building, which was later revised to create the Chrysler Building, and he was the supervising architect in the building of what became the Chrysler Building.

Lyons partnered with Bing & Bing on a number of prominent projects over a period of several decades. Among the earliest projects in that partnership was “the tallest apartment building in the world” at 903 Park Avenue at 79th Street—breaking the record of 12 stories with 17 stories when it opened in 1916. Another prominent Bing & Bing project was the Gramercy Park Hotel, completed in 1925. It is located at the commencement of Lexington Avenue on Gramercy Park and was built on the site of architect Stanford White’s home. He partnered with Bing & Bing on 2 Horatio Street apartment building which opened in 1931.

== Government work ==
The New York Times refers to him as an architect of the New York State Mortgage Commission in 1935. The New York Times mentions that after working as an architect with the Federal Housing Authority from 1942 to 1944, Lyons would be returning to private practice in October 1944.

== Notable buildings ==
From Emporis:

- Kaufman Arcade, West 35th Street and West 36th Street
- St Urban Apartments, 285 Central Park West (1905)
- Lorington Apartments, Central Park West (1908)
- 903 Park Avenue with Bing & Bing (1912)
- 902 Broadway (1913)
- 135 West 79th Street (1914)
- 955 Park Avenue with Bing & Bing (1914)
- 565 Park Avenue with Bing & Bing (1914)
- 432 Park Avenue South (1914)
- 11 Schermerhorn Street, Brooklyn with Bing and Bing (1914)
- 993 Park Avenue with Bing & Bing (1915)
- 1155 Park Avenue with Bing & Bing (1916)
- 152 West 58th Street (1916)
- 157 West 57th Street (1917) demolished
- Bromley Apartments (1918)
- 6 West 48th Street (1919)
- Blackstone Hotel, 50 East 58th Street (1922)
- Parc Lincoln Hotel, 166 West 75th Street (1922)
- 310 West 72nd Street (1924)
- Cathedral Parkway Apartments (1925)
- Carnegie Plaza (1925)
- Colorado Apartments, 235 West 76th Street (1925)
- Gramercy Park Hotel with Bing & Bing (1925)
- 304 West 75th Street (1927)
- 40 East 49th Street (1927)
- 509 Madison Avenue (1929)
- Wellington Hotel, 871 7th Avenue (1929)
- Gramercy Court, 245 East 21st Street (1930)
- 7 Park Avenue, (1930)
- 400 East 50th Street (1930)
- 35 West 90th Street (1931)
- 2 Horatio Street (1931)
