= Jackson Square Park =

Public park in Manhattan, New York

Coordinates: 40.738900°N 74.002886°W

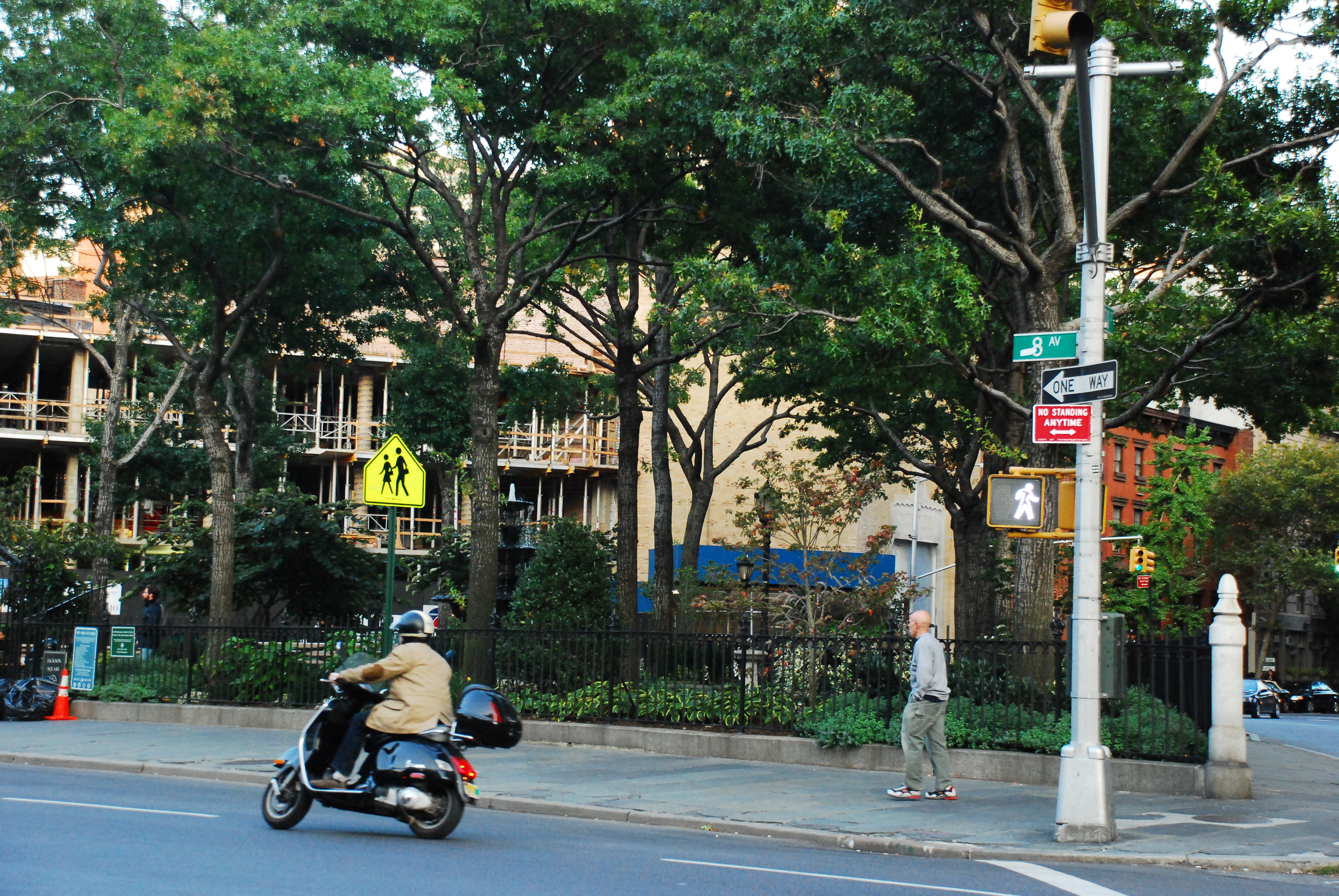
The park as seen from Eighth Avenue

Location of Jackson Square Park in Manhattan

Jackson Square Park is an urban park in the Greenwich Village Historic District in Manhattan, New York City, United States. The 0.227 acres (920 m^{2}) park is bordered by 8th Avenue on the west, Horatio Street on the south, and Greenwich Avenue on the east. The park interrupts West 13th Street.

Its triangular shape arose from the intersection of two Native American footpaths that grew into Greenwich Village streets. Later, the Commissioners' Plan of 1811 created a new street grid for Manhattan, which ultimately resulted in 8th Avenue being built through the intersection.

The triangular area developed from an unimproved public rallying place, to a classic Victorian viewing garden, to a children's playground, and finally a contemporary mixed-use space.

== Pre-Colonial: Intersection of footpaths ==
Two footpaths would emerge as foundational streets in what is today's Meatpacking district and West Village of Manhattan. One footpath led up from the riverbank trading station called Sapohanikan and was both largely perpendicular to the shore and aligned closely to the solar equinox of spring and fall. It would become what we today call Gansevoort Street. Its parallel offspring, Horatio Street, forms the southern border of the park. The other footpath came up from the south and would become what we today call Greenwich Avenue, which forms the east side of the park.

Basis of triangular shape set by Native Americans

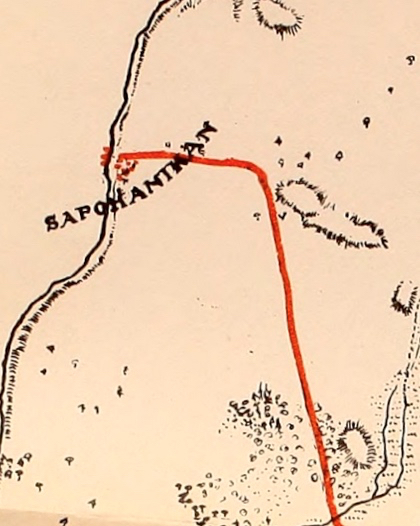
The convergence of Native American footpaths upon which rest today Gansevoort St. and Greenwich Ave. in a 1922 rendering (R P Bolton)

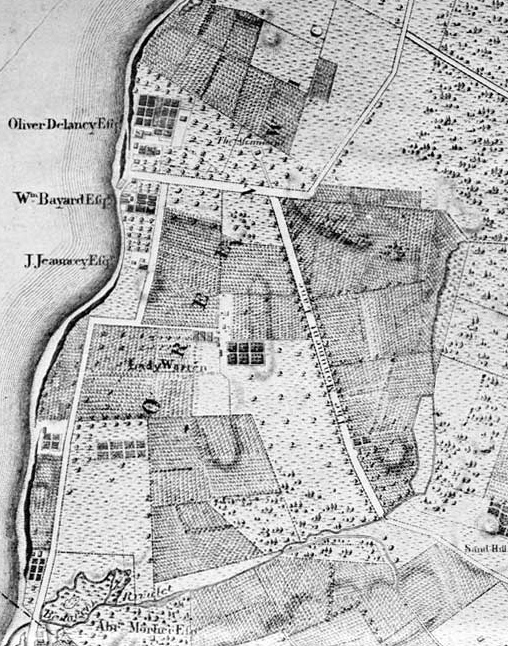
Showing connecting roads to the north and a reference to the Wolfe Monument. The footpaths had evolved into Colonial roads by 1767.

== Colonial: Evolution of roads ==
By the late 18th century the footpaths had evolved into roads, with connecting roads emerging to the north. The city's first war memorial was erected in 1762 among farmland at the northern terminus of Greenwich Avenue (known then as Monument Lane) a few hundred feet north of what is now Jackson Square Park. It was an obelisk honoring British Major General James Wolfe who died in the Battle of Quebec. By 1773, the monument no longer appeared on local survey maps, though why it was dismantled is unknown.

== 1811–72: Rallying point ==
On March 22, 1811, the New York State Legislature adopted the Commissioners' Plan of 1811, the visionary but rigid grid system of streets to the north. But the decision to have 8th Avenue continue south below 14th Street appears to have not been implemented until the 1830s. This 8th Avenue extension would become the western side of the park. At the same time, Gansevoort Street was truncated by half a block, therefore no longer intersecting with what is Greenwich Avenue, in an effort to simplify the multitude of intersecting roads.

It is not certain when the triangular area was formally named “Jackson Square” but it is referred to as such in local newspapers by the early 1850s. It was presumably named for Andrew Jackson, US president from 1829 to 1837, who died in 1845. It is not to be confused with the contemporaneously owned private park of the same name at the foot of Jackson Street at the East River.

Until 1872 the area was simply an open intersection of streets, acting occasionally as a gathering place for political and civic rallies of up to 1,000 and even 2,000 people in attendance, often featuring temporarily constructed platforms for speakers. Nighttime illumination came from burning tar barrels, later gas lighting and then eventually electric lighting. Certainly by the early 1850s Jackson Square had become a regular location for fireworks and music each 4 July, a tradition which would last for decades.

During the second half of the 19th century, the Jackson Square area was referred to as the “Scotch quarter." It was also known for its Irish-born residents from the three northeast counties that are closest to Scotland.

Two great halls, Jackson Hall and Caledonian Hall (housed at the Caledonian Club), were sited on separate lots on what is now 2 Horatio Street, adding to the reputation of the area as a place of assembly. The Jackson Square Branch of The New York Public Library opened in 1888 at adjacent West 13th Street. George W. Vanderbilt provided funds while renowned architect Richard Morris Hunt was retained for design and construction. The branch closed in 1967.

== 1872–88: Becoming a park ==
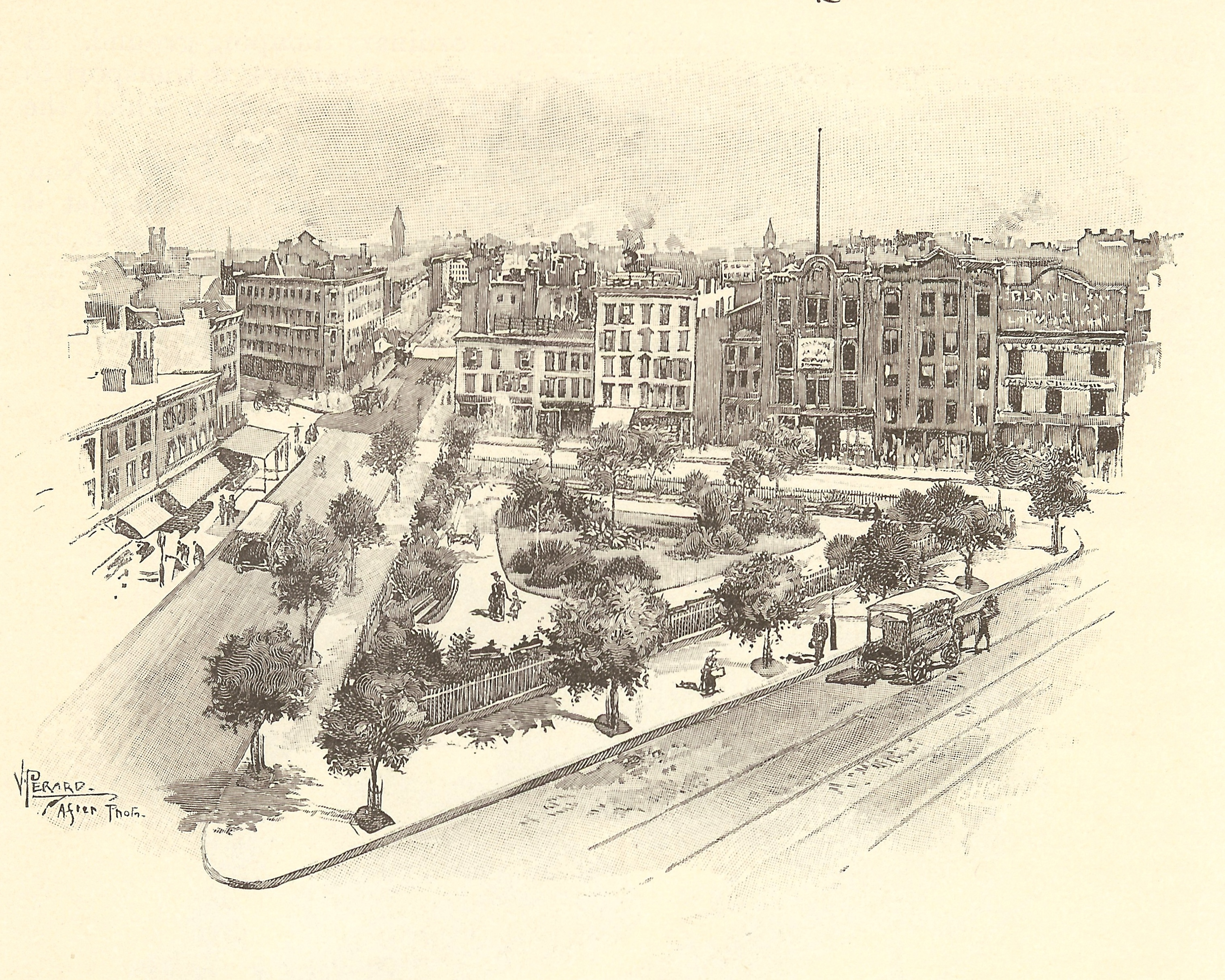
Rendering (1892)

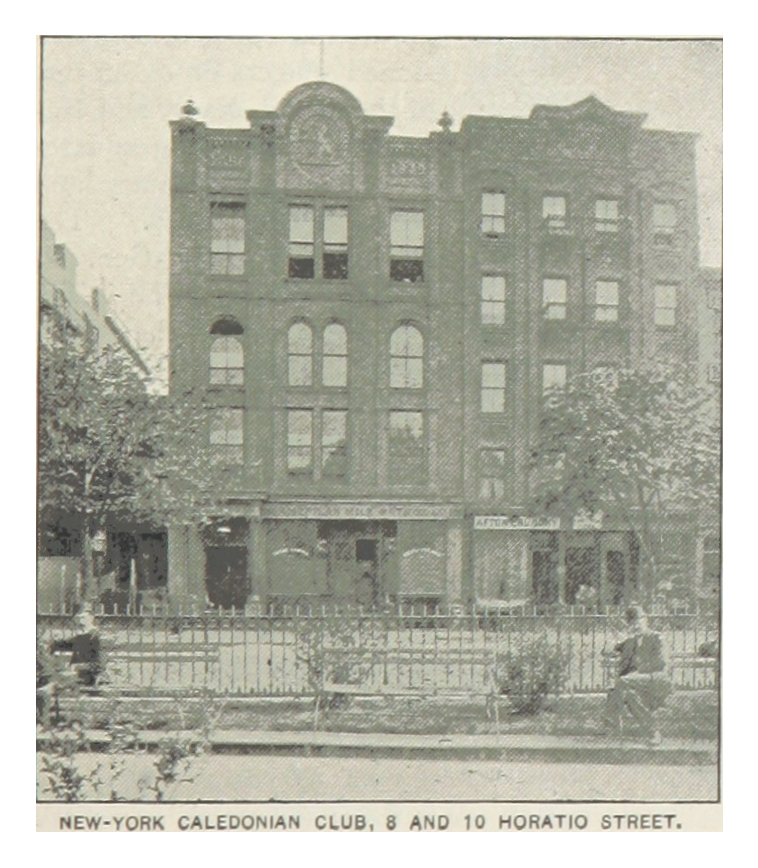
View from the park south to the Caledonian Club on Horatio Street showing walkway, benches and rail of original Vaux design, 1893

Parks Commission records show that the following improvements were made by June 1872 at Jackson Square: “5,900 square feet walks graded; 103 cubic yards masonry in foundations; 460 lineal feet railing; 462 lineal feet coping; 6 lamp-posts furnished and set.” The triangular area was enclosed with a high iron railing, sodded and planted with a half dozen small trees. In 1873 sidewalks of blue-stone were added around the perimeter of the fenced-in greenery. But the interior was not open to the public, so it could only be enjoyed by viewing it from outside. The New York Tribune reports, “The children reached through the railings and pulled blades of green seed grass, and on warm nights the neighbors with their babies found seats around the coping where they could catch whiffs of ‘county air.’” The prevailing view at the time was that small green spaces should be kept closed "for the fear of the ravages of the multitudes."

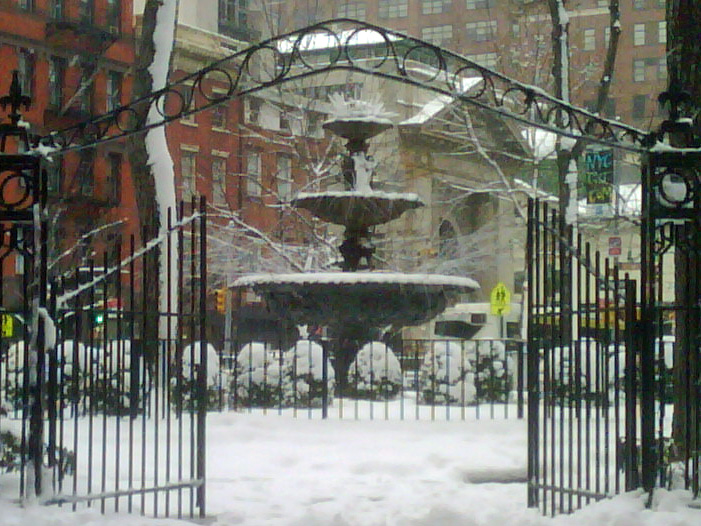
The fountain in winter

After several years of lobbying from the public, in 1887 Mayor Abram Hewitt promoted a citywide effort to improve public access to small parks and squares that were not open to the public. In that year Parks superintendent Samuel Parsons Jr. and consulting architect Calvert Vaux collaborated on a new design for Jackson Square.

By August 1888, the City Parks Commissioner officially opened “Jackson Park” after four months of construction. Improvements included a new gateway, an asphalt walk ten feet wide around the interior, 300 feet in length and the circuit of the park, along which seats were placed. A drinking fountain was added. Described in city documents and newspapers only in its initial year as "Jackson Park," the name "Jackson Square Park" took hold by 1889. Samuel Parsons later described the design for Jackson Square Park: “Walks…wound around the outskirts along the fence, leaving a border for planting of five or ten feet...[while] the central space was made a great bouquet of brilliant flowers and leaves...the central showy bedding, flanked and nested as it were among masses of trees and shrubs."

== 20th and 21st centuries ==
Attitudes toward the use of open space in cities changed in the early 20th century with progressive social reformists reshaping parks to more practically and actively address the needs of urban residents, especially children and mothers.

Between 1910 and 1911 the central idea of the park being a classic Victorian “viewing” park was eliminated when its central feature, the large raised "showy bedding" in the center, was leveled and covered with gravel for use as a playground. Swings and see-saws were erected. A pit was also dug and filled with sand for the children to play in. By 1913, Jackson Square Park was formally participating in what the City called “little farmers” program which allowed children to tend to their very own, dedicated small plot in which to grow flowers and vegetables. Started in 1902 in DeWitt Clinton Park by Frances Griscom Parsons, the idea quickly spread across New York City and to some degree nationally until the distraction of World War I.

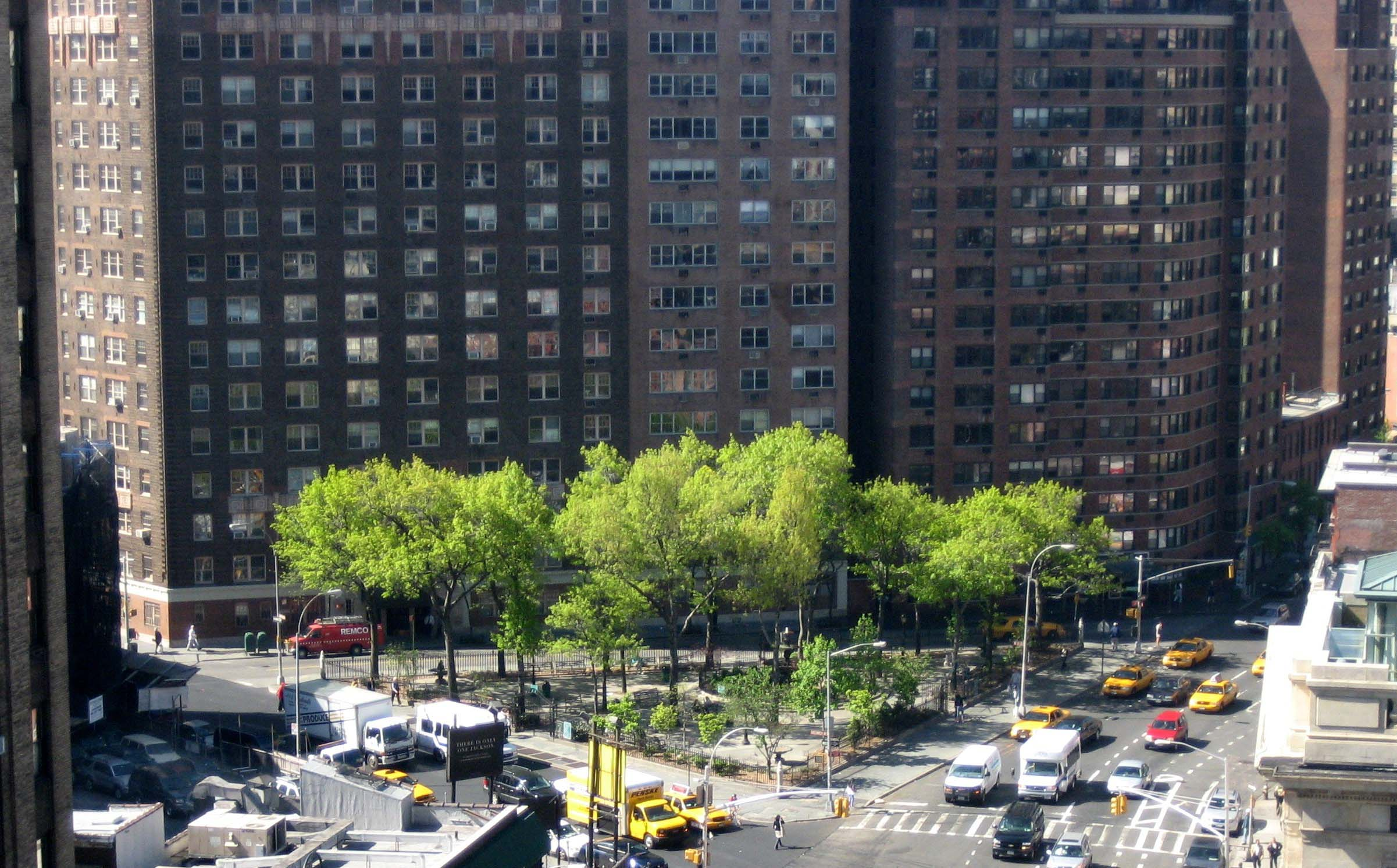
Jackson Square Park, view south toward Horatio Street

The park underwent renovations in the 1930s—17 pin oaks were planted on the perimeter, the shower basin was replaced by a new wading pool, and new benches were installed. The park had developed a reputation as park ideal for mothers and children. Installed in 1971, an eight-by-thirteen foot “combination fountain and jungle gym...a water spray for children that also serves as a decorative park fountain” replaced a three-foot high conventional shower.

Perhaps because of the opening of the larger Bleecker Street Playground in 1966 there was less of a need for Jackson Square Park to remain a children's playground. In 1990 a capital reconstruction project was completed that changed the park to reflect what is seen today. It included planting new greenery and restoring the historic iron fencing and benches. The centerpiece, a new cast-iron fountain with planters and a granite base, evokes the 19th-century origins of Jackson Square Park but is newly constructed.

Since 2008, the Jackson Square Alliance, a 510c3 non-profit organization, has helped support maintenance of the park and encouraged its use by the public.
