= Abingdon Square Park =

Public park in Manhattan, New York

Coordinates: 40.7370840°N 74.0057820°W

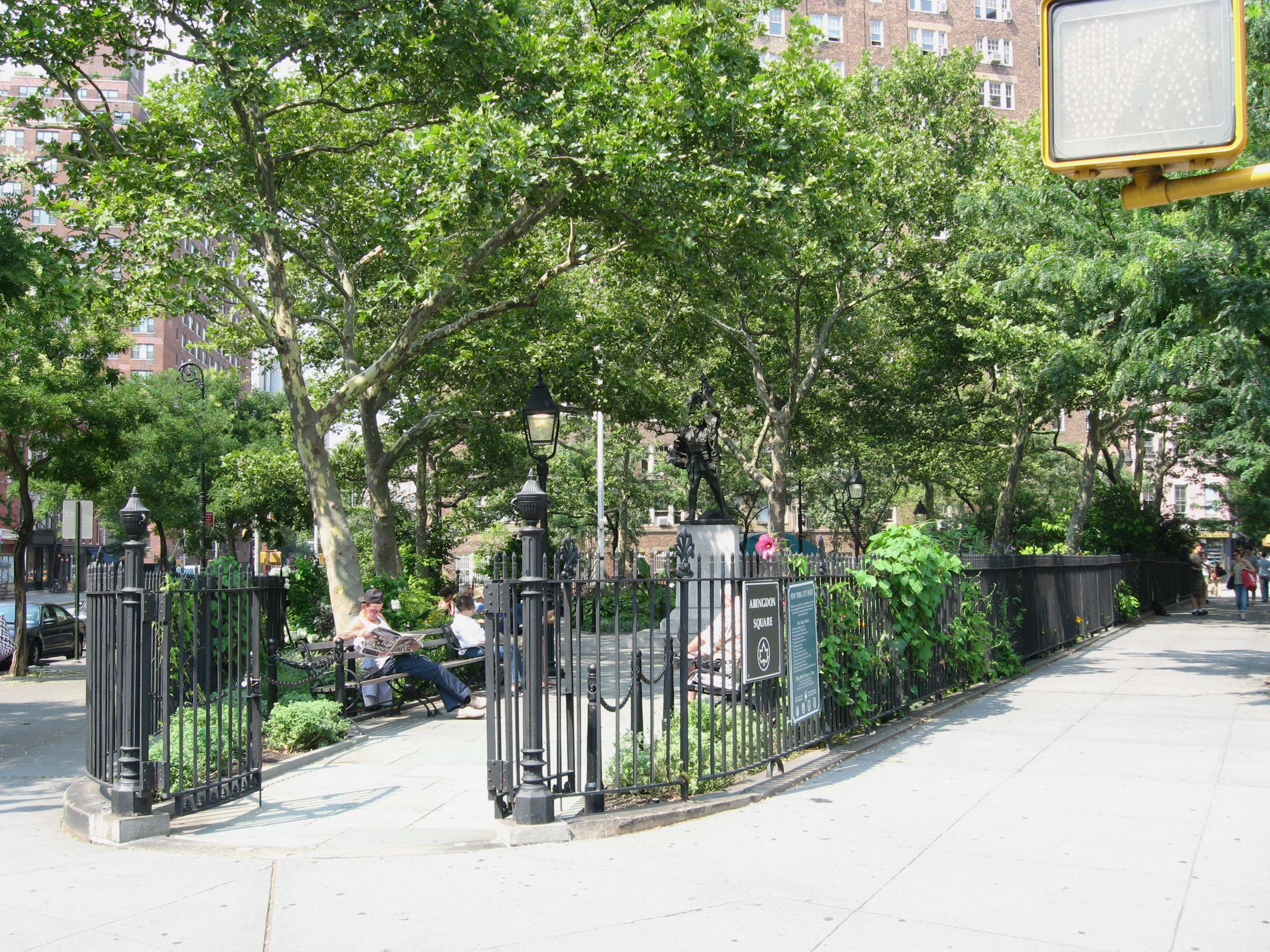
South entrance

Abingdon Square Park is located in the New York City borough of Manhattan in Greenwich Village. The park is bordered by Eighth Avenue, Bank Street, Hudson Street and West 12th Street.

Abingdon Square Park is one of New York City's oldest parks, and at 0.25 acres (1,000 m^{2}), one of it smallest. It is maintained by the Abingdon Square Conservancy, a community-based park association, in cooperation with the New York City Department of Parks and Recreation.

== History ==
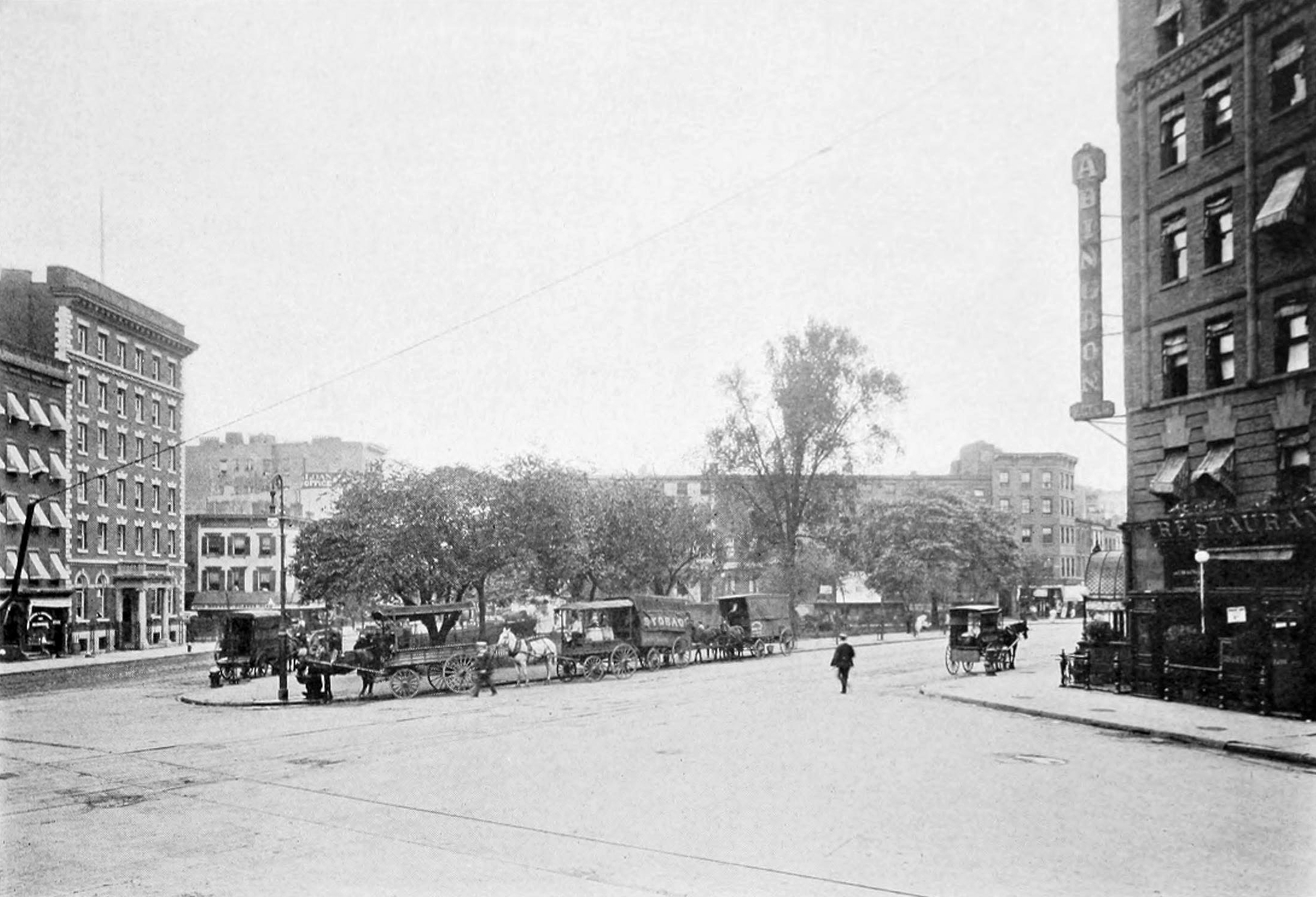
Abingdon Square, 1907

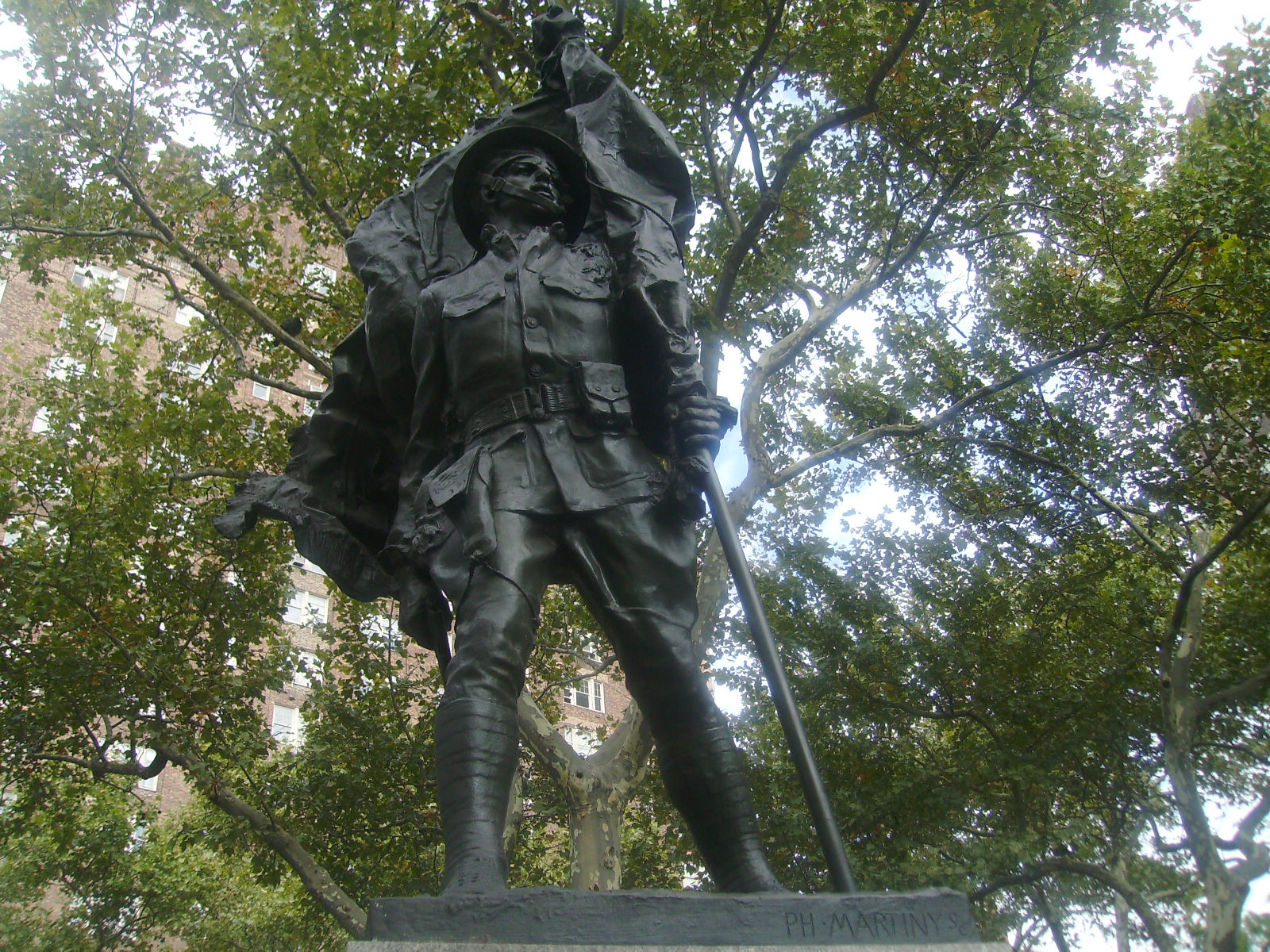
The Abingdon Square Memorial, created by sculptor Philip Martiny, was dedicated in 1921 before a crowd of twenty thousand.

New York City acquired the land on which the park resides on April 22, 1831, and it was enclosed with a cast-iron fence in 1836. In the 1880s, an effort was initiated by Mayor Abram Stevens Hewitt to expand public access to parks. Architect Calvert Vaux was part of a group that created a new design for Abingdon Square.

The square was part of a 300-acre (1.2 km^{2}) estate purchased by Sir Peter Warren in 1740. Abingdon Square was named for a prominent eighteenth-century area resident, Charlotte Warren, who married Englishman Willoughby Bertie, the 4th Earl of Abingdon and received the land as a wedding gift from her father. Although most explicitly British place names in Manhattan were altered after the Revolutionary War, Abingdon Square retained its name due to the well-known patriotic sympathies of Charlotte and the Earl.

In 2005, the Greenwich Village Society for Historic Preservation recognized the park's then-recent renovation with a Village Award. On August 3, 2009, a small garden was established inside the park as a memorial to Adrienne Shelly, an actress and film producer who was slain in her office located in 15 Abingdon Square.

== Conservancy ==
Abingdon Square Conservancy is a non-profit public charity exempt from federal income tax under Section 501(c)(3) of the Internal Revenue Code. The Conservancy's mission is to enhance and maintain the Square as a scenic and historic landmark. The Conservancy is solely dependent on private donations for its operations and receives no public funding.

The Conservancy employs a horticulturalist to design and maintain plantings, provide gardening services, liaise with the City, and supervise maintenance in the park. A groundskeeper is employed to keep the Square clean. The Square is maintained in cooperation with the New York City Parks and Recreation Department, which collects trash and locks and unlocks the gates.

Annual Conservancy events include a spring tulip display, Tulip Celebration (a member appreciation cocktail party), a carved Pumpkin Patch on Halloween night and a winter holiday decoration and light display.

== Transportation ==
The M11, M12 and M14A SBS bus lines terminate at Abingdon Square. The New York City Subway's 14th Street/Eighth Avenue station is also nearby.

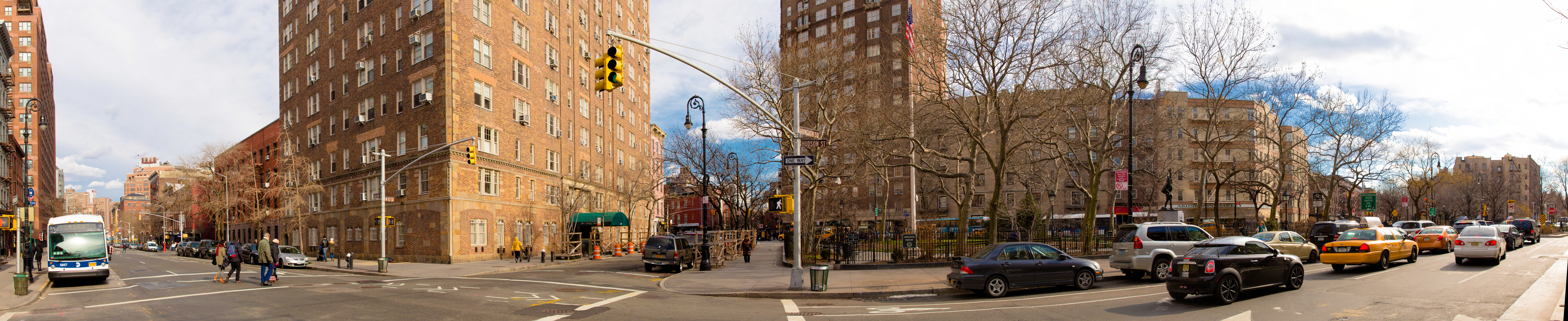
Panorama

== See also ==
- List of New York City parks
