= Park Avenue Historic District (Manhattan) =

Historic district in Manhattan, New York

- U.S. National Register of Historic Places
- U.S. Historic district
- New York State Register of Historic Places
- New York City Landmark
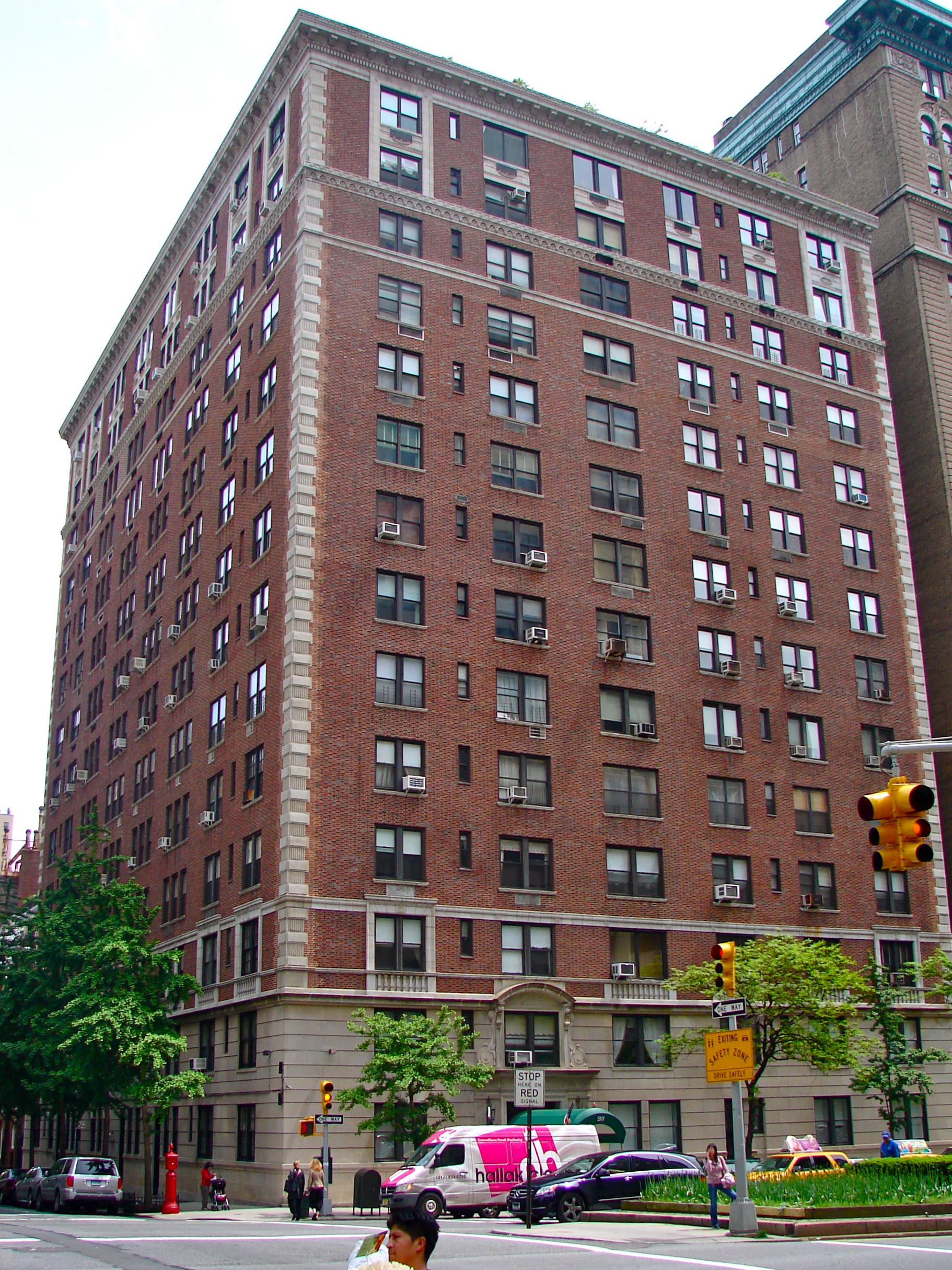
- 911 Park Avenue, a building in the district

- Location within Manhattan Location within New York City Location within New York Location within the United States
- Location: 900–1240 and 903–1235 Park Ave, Manhattan, New York, US
- Coordinates: 40.7814°N 73.9564°W
- Area: 41.3 acres (16.7 ha)
- Built: 1913
- Architect: Multiple
- Architectural style: Late 19th And 20th Century Revivals, Late Victorian
- NRHP reference No.: 10000588
- NYCL No.: 2547

Significant dates
- Added to NRHP: 2010-08-29
- Designated NYSRHP: 2010-07-13
- Designated NYCL: 2014-04-29

The Park Avenue Historic District is a historic district on the Upper East Side of Manhattan in New York City, New York, US. It consists of two overlapping designations, which preserve a series of apartment buildings on Park Avenue. The designations consist of a New York City historic district and a National Register of Historic Places district. Most of the district's buildings are apartment buildings, developed at a time when apartments, lower-density flats, and rowhouses were popular among the middle class. The district also has a number of standalone houses, as well as the Church of St. Ignatius Loyola complex and the Park Avenue Christian Church.

Park Avenue was originally known as Fourth Avenue and carried the tracks of the New York and Harlem Railroad, which developed its Park Avenue main line in the 1830s. The earliest buildings in the district had been built in 1856, but the railroad's presence made the lots on Fourth Avenue less desirable than other streets. The first apartments were built on Fourth Avenue in the late 19th century, and the road became Park Avenue in 1887. After the railroad was put in a tunnel in the 1900s, more upscale apartments followed. Development slowed after the Wall Street crash of 1929, but the neighborhood continued to be favored by the wealthy.

== Description ==
The Park Avenue Historic District consists of two overlapping designations along Park Avenue, on the Upper East Side of Manhattan in New York City, New York, US. The National Register of Historic Places (NRHP) designation was granted by the National Park Service in 2010. This designation covers the buildings at 900–1240 and 903–1235 Park Avenue, on both sides of the avenue between 79th Street to the south and 96th Street to the north. Sixty-four buildings in the district, from 79th to 91st streets, are also designated by the New York City Landmarks Preservation Commission (LPC) as a New York City historic district. The LPC district is located between existing city districts at its north and south ends (the Carnegie Hill Historic District and the Upper East Side Historic District, respectively), which were previously designated by the LPC.

The buildings in the NRHP district between 91st and 94th streets are covered by the LPC's Carnegie Hill Historic District. The buildings between 94th and 96th streets are excluded from any LPC district because of their dissimilarity from the district's other buildings. Several buildings in the district are themselves listed as individual New York City landmarks, some of which are also listed on the NRHP on their own right. These include the Church of St. Ignatius Loyola, Lewis G. Morris House, and Reginald DeKoven House in both districts, and the George F. Baker Houses within the NRHP district only.

=== Park Avenue ===
Park Avenue itself was previously called Fourth Avenue, which runs above the railroad tracks of the Park Avenue main line, which was covered over in the 1870s (see § Background). The section of Park Avenue within the district contains a series of planted medians called the Park Avenue Malls, after which the avenue is named. The malls extend north to 96th Street (where the line exits the tunnel) and south to Grand Central Terminal. Each mall runs the length of an entire block and is largely similar in appearance. The malls are surrounded by curbstones and contain grass, trees, and flowers. Since 1945, a Christmas tree lighting ceremony has taken place in the district's malls annually.

The malls were narrowed to 20 feet (6.1 m) when Park Avenue was widened in the 1920s. The landscape of the malls remains similar to its appearance in 1930, when much of the district's buildings were completed, though the plantings have been replaced several times over the years. In 1961, philanthropist Mary Lasker funded the planting of tulips, daffodils, and other plants in the malls between 75th and 96th streets, a continuation of an earlier planting program south of 75th Street. Clara Coffey redesigned the malls in 1970, and fences around the malls were subsequently removed. The malls between 86th and 96th streets were replanted by a neighborhood group in 1979, and a committee was formed in 1980 to coordinate plantings throughout all the malls.

=== Apartment buildings ===
Most of the district's buildings are apartment buildings, developed at a time when apartments, lower-density flats, and rowhouses were popular among the middle class. In its report for the neighboring Upper East Side Historic District, the LPC wrote that the apartment buildings on both sides of Park Avenue gave the road "its definition and character". While the structures largely date from the early 20th century, the boundaries also include structures built as late as the 1970s. The district's apartment buildings were generally designed by well-established residential architects, who included George and Edward Blum, Rosario Candela, J. E. R. Carpenter Jr.. George F. Pelham, Emery Roth, Schwartz & Gross, and D. Everett Waid. Simon and Arthur Gross, of Schwartz & Gross, was the most prolific designer in the district. Of the developers, Bing & Bing developed the most apartment buildings in the district, with seven; Abraham Bricken, a prolific builder in the Garment District of Manhattan, constructed five more. Candela worked with three major Italian American developers who built structures in the district: the Charles V. Paterno family, Anthony Campagna, and the D'Antona family.

The apartment buildings are generally made of masonry (specifically brick, with trim of stone or terracotta) and are 12 to 17 stories high. Many developers sought out corner sites where taller buildings were allowed under the city's zoning code. This was not always possible; unlike older neighborhoods where developers were responsible for entire blocks of development, the Park Avenue Historic District was developed in a more piecemeal fashion. The earliest apartment developments are generally in revivalist architectural styles such as the Colonial, Georgian, and Renaissance revival styles; later developments combined multiple architectural styles. Elements of medieval revival architecture were used in several 1920s buildings and were incorporated into the renovation of two existing tenements about that time. Art Deco design elements were used in other buildings during that decade.

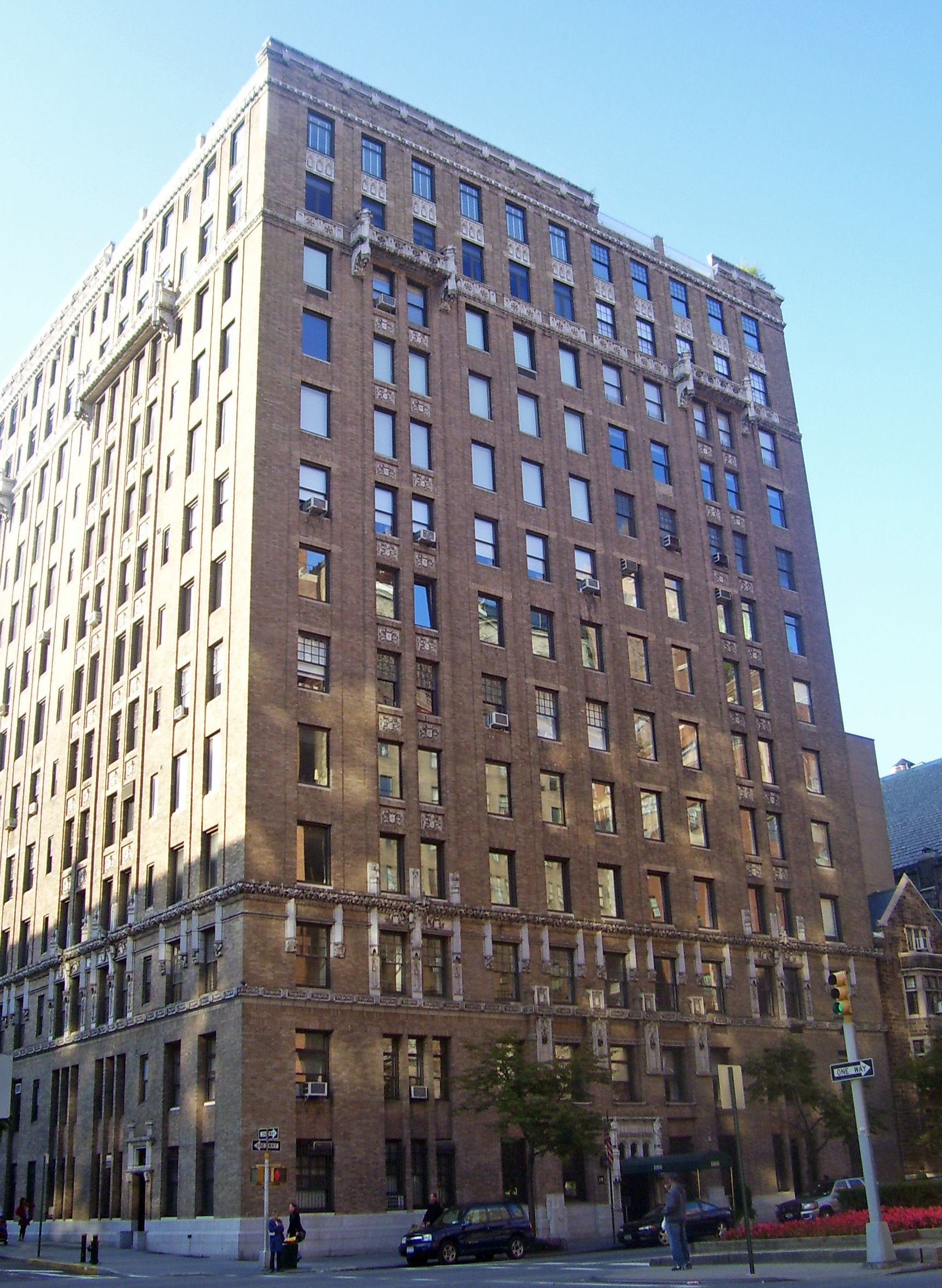
1000 Park Avenue, a brown-brick building variously cited as having a Jacobethan or Gothic Revival design

Brick was used consistently throughout these apartment buildings, as it was both inexpensive and could be readily manufactured with different hues. Many buildings had steel frames, and they operated similarly to apartment hotels, providing services such as furnished lobbies, elevator operators, ground-floor offices, and dumbwaiters between floors. The district's buildings improved on older residential plans as well, and many apartments spanned entire floors, with over a dozen rooms. For example, at 903 Park Avenue, apartments were arranged to evoke the arrangement of old townhouses. Post–World War I buildings tended to include penthouse apartments on their top stories, where the wealthiest could overlook the streets below, such as businessman Condé Nast's duplex at 1040 Park Avenue. After wooden water tanks were legally mandated in the district's high-rise buildings from the 1920s onward, these buildings also began to incorporate water tanks into the architectural designs.

==== Specific structures ====
One of the southernmost buildings in the district is 903 Park, a 17-story Renaissance Revival building designed by Robert T. Lyons and Warren & Wetmore; it was once dubbed the world's tallest apartment house. 925 Park Avenue, a 14-story Renaissance Revival building by Delano & Aldrich and Pollard & Steinam, has a brick and limestone facade and incorporated bachelor apartments as well as two- and three-story units. Other brick-and-limestone Renaissance Revival structures exist at 960–962, 970, and 993 Park. 1000 Park Avenue, variously cited as having a Jacobethan or Gothic Revival design, was designed by Emery Roth with a brown-brick facade matching the exterior of the neighboring Park Avenue Christian Church.

Notable post-World War I apartment buildings include 1049 Park Avenue, a 14-story Georgian Revival building designed by Mills & Bottomsley with a brown-brick facade. Slightly further north are the 15-story Renaissance Revival cooperative designed by Mott B. Schmidt at 1088 Park Avenue, along with Schwartz & Gross's neo-Gothic apartment building at 1185 Park Avenue (the latter of which is part of the NRHP designation and the LPC's Carnegie Hill district). Both 1088 and 1185 Park Avenue have large interior courtyards. 1085 Park Avenue, a 15-story Renaissance Revival building designed by Schwartz & Gross, incorporates a water tank behind a triumphal arch-shaped pavilion. 944 Park Avenue, a 16-story Art Deco design by George Pelham, contrasts with his earlier neoclassical work, with vertically oriented pilasters and brick piers. Other notable 1920s works include Candela's 15-story 1192 Park Avenue and Pelham's 16-story 1225 Park Avenue, both designed in the Renaissance Revival style.

A small number of structures in the district were built after World War II. These included 1036 Park Avenue, a 19-story building by Gustave W. Iser with a brick facade and ceramic-panel accents, and 1020 Park Avenue, a 21-story building by Wechsler & Schimenti with a tan brick and marble facade. At 1199 Park Avenue is an 18-story structure designed by Sylvan Bien with a central pavilion protruding from the rest of the facade. 1065 Park Avenue, built after the 1961 Zoning Resolution, was designed by Stephen C. Lyras with a white-brick facade rising from a small plaza, contrasting with earlier structures that extend all the way to the sidewalk lot line.

=== Other buildings ===
The Lewis G. Morris House within the district

The district also has a number of standalone houses. The NRHP district has 13 rowhouses, as well as mansions such as the Morris, DeKoven, and Baker houses. The Morris and DeKoven houses, on adjacent blocks, both date from the early 1910s, just as Park Avenue was being developed with apartment buildings. The Morris House (1913), designed by Ernest Flagg, is a red-brick Federal style mansion at the corner of 85th Street. The DeKoven House (1912), designed by John Russell Pope, has a brick and limestone facade in a Jacobean Revival style.

The district includes some institutional buildings as well. At 980 Park Avenue is the Church of St. Ignatius Loyola Complex, a complex of five buildings, of which three (the church, parish house, and Loyola School) are in the district. St. Ignatius Loyola Church (1900) and Loyola School (1901) are stone structures, both designed by J. William Schickel of Schickel & Ditmars; the parish house, designed in 1882 by James Stroud, adjoins these structures. The Park Avenue Christian Church slightly farther north, designed by Cram, Goodhue, & Ferguson, has a stone facade; the church building remains intact, but its parish house has been partly demolished.

== History ==
=== Background ===
The Upper East Side was mostly rural farmland when the Commissioners' Plan of 1811 created the Manhattan street grid. The widest avenue on Manhattan's East Side, originally Fourth Avenue, carried the tracks of the New York and Harlem Railroad, which were developed in the 1830s. A tunnel for the railroad was dug between 92nd and 95th streets. The Harlem Railroad was later incorporated into the New York Central Railroad, and a terminal for the New York Central at 42nd Street, the Grand Central Depot, opened in 1871. Following the depot's opening, the New York State Legislature mandated that the tracks on Fourth Avenue be lowered beneath the street and covered over. Various rock tunnels, brick tunnels, and steel-beam bridges were built above the line between 42nd and 96th streets.

After the Fourth Avenue Improvement project was completed in 1874, the railroads, approaching Grand Central Depot from the north, descended into the new Park Avenue Tunnel at 96th Street and continued underground into the new depot. As part of the project, Fourth Avenue was transformed into a boulevard with a median strip that covered ventilation grates from the tunnel. This created median strips similar to those above the older Park Avenue Tunnel in Murray Hill, Manhattan. Several stations were built on the new tunnel, including the 86th Street station, though they did not pose any serious competition to the elevated Third Avenue Line two blocks east.

=== Development ===
==== 19th century ====
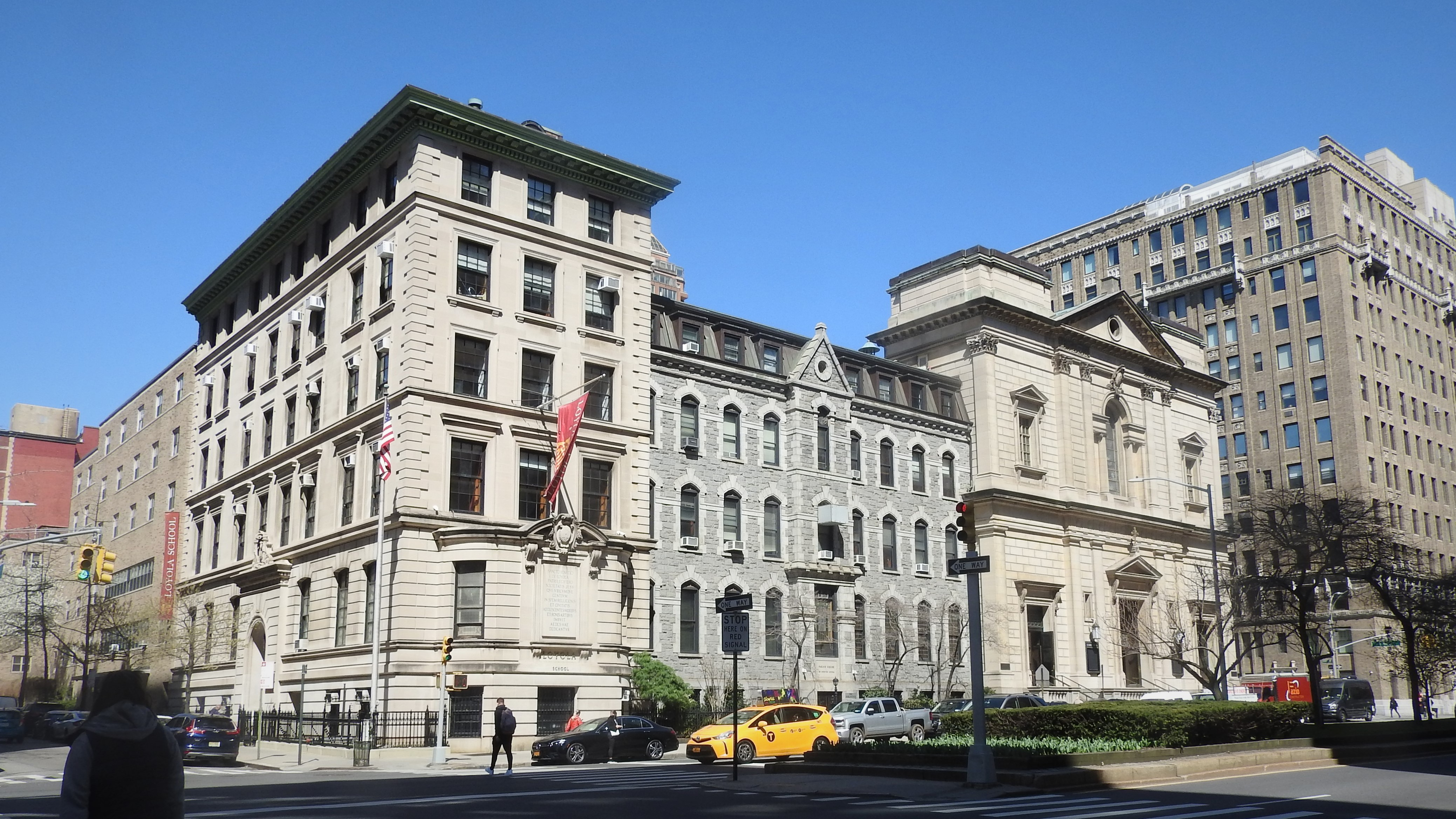
The Church of St. Ignatius Loyola complex was built in the district in the late 1890s.

Even before the railroad was covered over, the earliest buildings in the district had been built in 1856, when three- to four-story rowhouses were developed at 1108–1110 Park Avenue (between 89th and 90th streets). After the railroad opened, a hotel for rail travelers was established at 93rd Street, but the Panic of 1857 and then the American Civil War stunted further development of the area until 1865. With the completion of the Fourth Avenue Improvement, the tracks were no longer visible, and the Real Estate Record wrote that the avenue's landscaping and grading created "a particularly grand appearance". However, the lots closer to Fourth Avenue were less desirable because of noise and steam from the ventilation grates. As such, small apartments, rowhouses, and tenements were built closer to the avenue, and some buildings on Fourth Avenue were oriented to face the side streets, away from the ventilation grates. Rowhouses were concentrated near 93rd Street, where the railroad was already fully tunneled through; apartments and tenements lined the rest of Fourth Avenue. Seven remaining buildings from this era still exist.

Two congregations erected new buildings in the district (both no longer extant) during the mid-1880s: the Park Avenue Methodist Church at 86th Street and the Protestant Episcopal Church of the Redeemer at 82nd Street. In March 1887, Fourth Avenue north of 42nd Street was renamed Park Avenue in an attempt to improve the avenue's image. Following the renaming, additional early apartments were constructed, interspersed with three- to four-story rowhouses. Some of these apartments, such as the now-demolished Alvarado, Niagara, and Meteor, had ground-floor retail spaces. Several structures from the late 1880s and the 1890s remain extant, including eight residences, as well as the Church of St. Ignatius Loyola complex (built 1895–1900). In 1894, local residents formed the Park Avenue Association, which advocated for such quality-of-life changes as covering the railroad tunnel's vents and banning buses from the street to retain its residential character.

==== Early 20th century ====
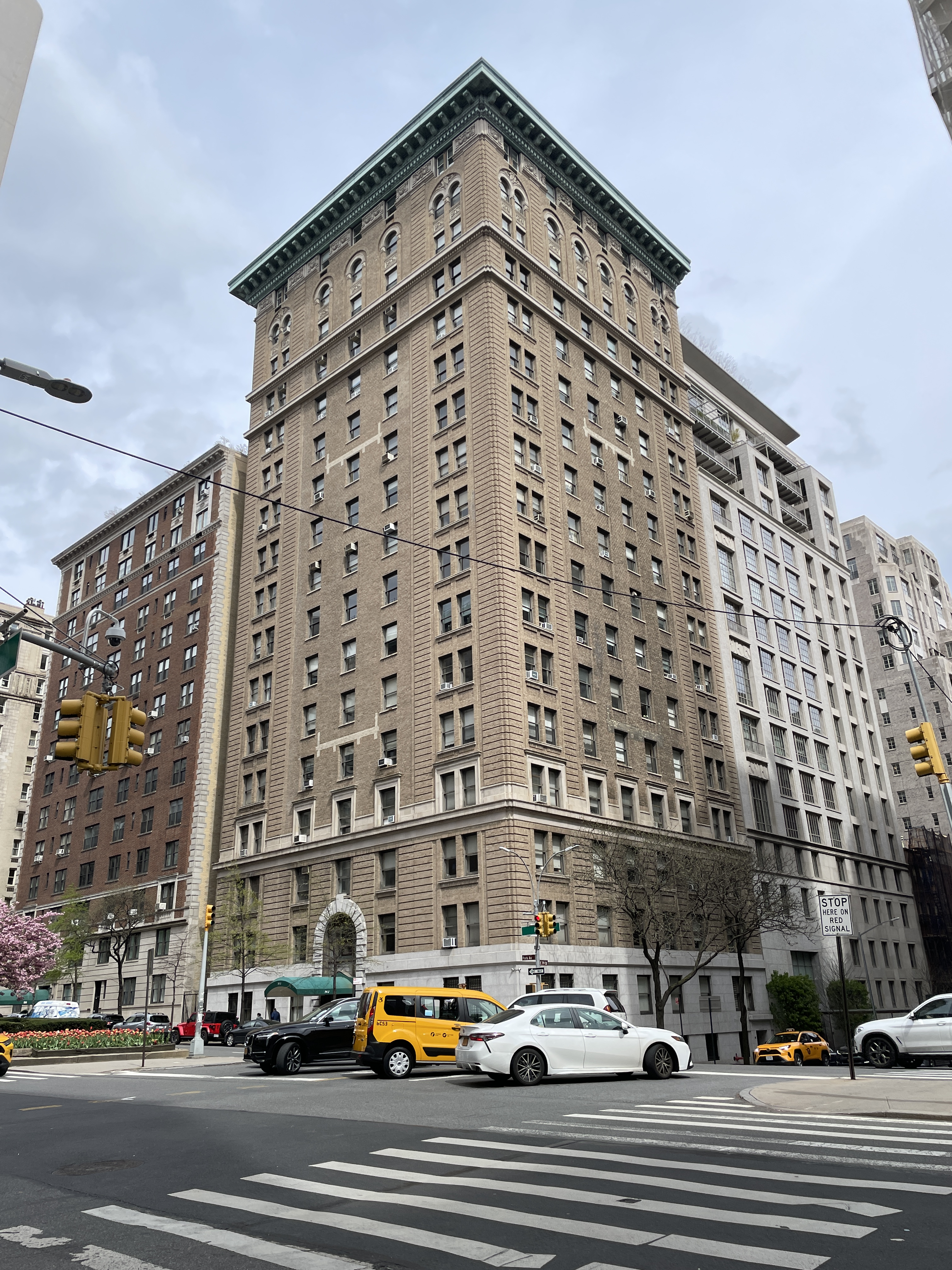
903 Park Avenue was an early building in the district.

On January 8, 1902, two trains heading toward Grand Central collided in the Park Avenue Tunnel after smoke from one train obscured the railway signals, killing 15 people and injuring more than 30 others. This prompted the New York Central to announce that all of the railroad's suburban lines to Grand Central would be electrified and put underground; the New York State Legislature subsequently banned all steam trains in Manhattan effective 1908. The relocation of the New York Central line underneath Park Avenue, and the subsequent relandscaping of the avenue, stimulated development there. Privately-owned mansions on Park Avenue were soon followed by high-class apartment development.

The earliest skyscraper apartment buildings in the district include 1240 Park Avenue (1904) and 925 Park Avenue (1908). Other early apartment developments on Park Avenue include 903, 955, 962, 969, 1000. and 1049 Park Avenue. During that time, town houses were still being developed on Park Avenue, in part because of the paucity of suitable sites on Fifth and Madison avenues to the west. Residents who developed townhouses on Park Avenue between 79th and 96th streets in the early 20th century included Amos Pinchot (1906) and Francis F. Palmer (1917, as part of the George F. Baker Houses). Not until the late 1910s did the rate of luxury apartment development increase on the avenue; buildings developed during this era included 1049 Park Avenue, completed in 1919.

A series of apartments at 1045, 1050, 1060 and 1105 Park Avenue, including the district's first cooperative, were built in 1922. Following the passage of the state's Multiple Dwelling Law in 1929, buildings in the district began to be developed with terraces. The Wall Street crash of 1929 resulted in a decrease in development. Some projects in the district were never built, including Fred F. French's proposal for a 52-story hotel and another design for a 21-story apartment building. During the interwar years, the district's apartments tended to be occupied only by the very wealthy; a 1927 survey found that Park Avenue's residents had a median income of $75,000 (equivalent to $1,390,000 in 2025). In the following years, Park Avenue became known around the world as an upscale residential boulevard. The NPS report wrote that the district was notable "as a repository of some of the finest 1910s and 1920s apartment buildings in New York City". The avenue was described as a "sanctuary of wealth" in the Brooklyn Eagle, and as the "World's Greatest Residence Street" in The New York Times. The avenue was itself widened to four lanes in each direction in the late 1920s and early 1930s, requiring both the medians and the sidewalks to be narrowed.

=== Later years ===
==== Mid- and late 20th century ====
1110 Park Avenue (pictured) was built on the site of rowhouses at 1108–1110 Park Avenue, the district's oldest buildings.

During the Great Depression, many of the district's apartment buildings struggled financially. With less rental income and a more difficult financial outlook for housing cooperative owners, these buildings either went into foreclosure or were sold to their mortgage holders to avoid foreclosure. The writer Christopher Gray wrote that, by 1945, foreclosure proceedings or buybacks had been instituted against half the apartment buildings on Park Avenue within the Upper East Side (stretching between 59th and 96th streets). Only three of the district's buildings constructed after 1930 were contributing properties to the National Register of Historic Places (NRHP) designation.

After World War II, more apartment developments on Park Avenue replaced existing tenements or houses. These included several buildings constructed between 1956 and 1973, many of which combined mid-century modern design details with the older buildings' tendencies to be built up to the lot line. The 1961 Zoning Resolution further changed development patterns by encouraged standalone towers with plazas, rather than shorter buildings extending to the street line. Only one building in the district, 1065 Park Avenue, was directly inspired by the resolution.

Racial and ethnic diversity on the avenue increased after World War II, though complaints of discrimination persisted, with many apartment buildings being operated by co-ops that could reject residents at will. For example, the city government found in 1962 that 1001 Park Avenue was excluding Jews from residency, and in another case in 1981, the board of 1120 Park Avenue fought against giving an apartment to the New York Public Library's president because of the possibility that the role could be filled by a racial minority. In his 1979 book The City Observed, Paul Goldberger wrote that, even though the buildings were large and formidable, "the ambience is dignified and classy".

==== 21st century ====
In the early 21st century, midblock apartment buildings replaced some of the district's older structures. Such new developments included 985 Park Avenue, constructed in 2007–2008, and 1055 Park Avenue, constructed in 2011. The district was added to the National Register of Historic Places in 2010. During the early 2010s, the Toll Brothers acquired 1108–1110 Park Avenue, which was replaced with an apartment building in 2015. The Park Avenue Christian Church sold its parish house near 85th Street in 2013, and the Extell Development Company replaced the parish house with a new building at 1010 Park Avenue. The New York City Landmarks Preservation Commission (LPC) designated the Park Avenue Historic District as a New York City historic district in 2014, amid opposition to 1010 Park. The LPC designation allowed 1010 Park to be developed, on the condition that fieldstone from the parish house be used in the new building, which was completed in 2018.

== See also ==
- List of New York City Designated Landmarks in Manhattan from 59th to 110th Streets
- National Register of Historic Places listings in Manhattan from 59th to 110th Streets

== Sources ==
- Fitch, James Marston; Waite, Diana S. (1974). Grand Central Terminal and Rockefeller Center: A Historic-critical Estimate of Their Significance. Albany, New York: The Division.
- [Landmarks Preservation Commission] (April 29, 2014). Park Avenue Historic District (PDF) (Report). New York City Landmarks Preservation Commission.
- [National Park Service] (August 29, 2010). National Register of Historic Places Inventory/Nomination: Park Avenue Historic District (PDF) (Report). National Park Service.
