= Chester Aldrich =

Chester Aldrich may refer to:

- Chester Hardy Aldrich, (1862–1924) 19th Governor of Nebraska
- Chester Holmes Aldrich, (1871–1940) American architect of the early 20th century
