= George F. Baker Jr. Houses =

Historic houses in Manhattan, New York

- George F. Baker Jr. and Sr. Houses
- U.S. National Register of Historic Places
- U.S. Historic district – Contributing property
- New York State Register of Historic Places
- New York City Landmark
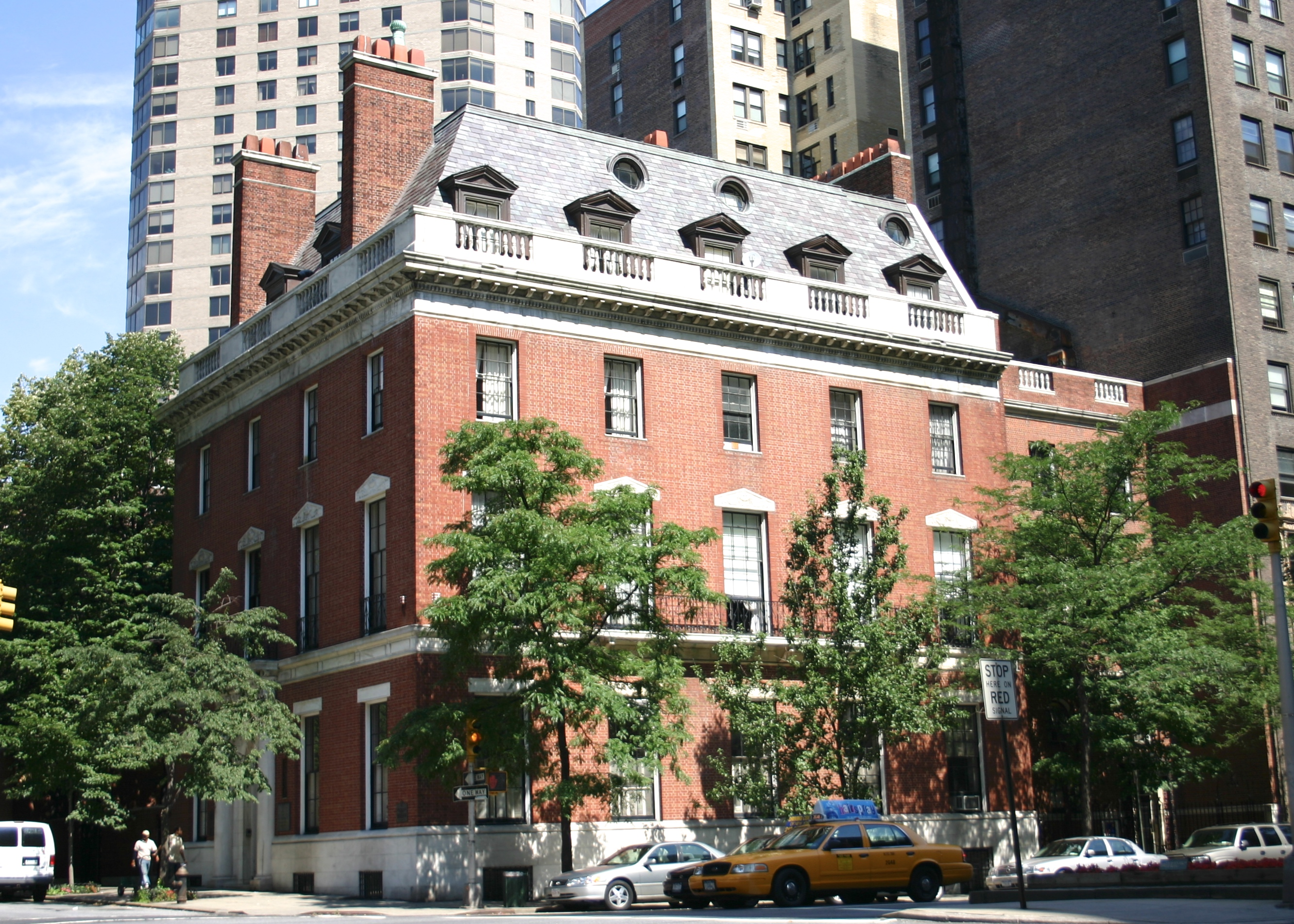

- Location within Manhattan Location within New York City Location within New York Location within the United States
- Location: 67, 69, and 75 E. 93rd St., Manhattan, New York, US
- Coordinates: 40°47′06″N 73°57′15″W
- Area: less than one acre
- Built: 75 East 93rd: Main House, 1918; North Annex, 1929; Ballroom Wing, 1929.; 69 East 93rd: Garage & Staff Residence, 1929.; 67 East 93rd: Townhouse, 1931.
- Architect: Delano & Aldrich
- Architectural style: Neo-Georgian
- Part of: Park Avenue Historic District (ID10000588)
- NRHP reference No.: 82003367
- NYSRHP No.: 06101.002466
- NYCL No.: 0867, 0439, 0437

Significant dates
- Added to NRHP: June 3, 1982
- Designated NYSRHP: April 9, 1982
- Designated NYCL: July 23, 1974 (67 East 93rd Street); January 14, 1969 (69, 75 East 93rd Street)

The George F. Baker Jr. Houses are a complex of three residential buildings at 67, 69, and 75 East 93rd Street on the Upper East Side of Manhattan in New York City. They were completed in 1918–1931 to the designs of the architecture firm Delano & Aldrich. The oldest of the group is the Francis F. Palmer House at 75 East 93rd Street. A later owner, George F. Baker Jr, expanded No. 75 and built Nos. 69 and 67. Each of the three buildings is a New York City designated landmark, and the entire ensemble was added as a group to the National Register of Historic Places in 1982.

== Early history (1918–1940) ==
=== Initial construction ===
In early 1916, stockbroker Francis Fletcher Palmer (1874–1923) bought a lot in Manhattan on the northwest corner of East 93rd Street and Park Avenue, which as recently as 1913 had been occupied by a Roman Catholic school for girls, run by nuns of the Ursuline order. To facilitate construction of a new house, Palmer (or the previous owner of the property) demolished the two school buildings on the site. Palmer engaged the architects Delano & Aldrich, who designed a neoclassical house with a handsome white-marble balustrade, separating a three-story brick facade from a two-story slate mansard roof. The house occupied the eastern fifty-five feet along 93rd Street, while the western forty-five feet was dedicated to an enclosed garden with a central, circular fountain. At the time of the 1920 US census, Palmer was living in the new house with his wife, seven children, and ten servants. He died of pneumonia in April 1923, and in May 1926, his heirs sold the house to financier George Fisher Baker Jr. (1878–1937).

=== Brevoort mansion ===
Earlier, in July 1919, Baker and his wife, Edith Kane Baker (1884–1977), bought the Henry Brevoort Mansion (Edith Baker was Brevoort's great-granddaughter), built in 1834 on lower Fifth Avenue to the designs of architects Ithiel Town and Alexander Jackson Davis. The couple intended to renovate the house for their own use but sold it in 1925. Before they did, they removed two mantels and an ornamental plaster frieze, all of which they installed in their new living room on 93rd Street.

=== First expansion ===
Palmer's house sat on a lot with sixty-four feet of frontage on Park Avenue and one hundred feet of frontage along 93rd Street. By purchasing the adjacent lots to the north (1190 Park Avenue) and west (69–71 East 93rd Street), George Baker increased his frontage on both the street and the avenue, allowing him to expand both the house and the garden. At 1190 Park Avenue, he demolished a thirty-seven-foot wide, five-story residential building and engaged Delano & Aldrich to design an annex on Park Avenue and a ballroom wing to the west of the annex, both completed in 1929. At 69–71 East 93rd Street, he demolished a thirty-nine-foot wide, five-story residential building, and had his architects build a twenty-five-foot wide garage building with staff quarters above, also completed in 1929. Baker used the remaining fourteen feet of frontage to expand the garden.

=== Garden fountain ===
In 1927, the Bakers contemplated replacing Palmer's garden fountain. In a memo dated September 1927, Percival Gallagher (1874–1934), a landscape architect with Olmsted Associates, advised Mrs. Baker, "The fountain is in rather bad condition. The central feature of it has broken off, and it would really be better to install a new and finer object. I think a figure in lead or bronze would be a more practical thing because it would not have to be protected and covered against the freezing and thawing of the winter, and thus would always be visible, which is not the case with figures of stone." In 1930, following completion of construction work adjacent to the garden, the Bakers bought a bronze triton fountain created by the Swedish sculptor Carl Milles.

=== Second expansion ===
In September 1930, George Baker bought the twenty-two-foot wide lot at 67 East 93rd Street, immediately west of his garage building. He demolished the existing four-story, brownstone-faced townhouse, and in January 1931, filed plans to construct a new four-story, steel-framed, brick-faced townhouse, again designed by Delano & Aldrich, to be used as a residence for Baker's father, George F. Baker Sr. The house was completed in October 1931, but the father died at his home on Madison Avenue before he could move into the new house.

=== No. 75 shuttered ===
George F. Baker Jr. died in 1937, and by the time of the 1940 US census, Edith Baker had vacated the main house, and was using the staff quarters over the garage at No. 69 as a pied-à-terre. At the time, her son, George F. Baker III, was living in the house at No. 67.

== 75 East 93rd Street (1941–present) ==
No. 75 East 93rd Street sat vacant during the war years and for thirteen postwar years, during which time the Baker family limited their occupancy of the property to Nos. 67 and 69. In 1958, Edith Baker sold the Main House, the north annex and the ballroom wing. (Before doing so, she donated two antique chandeliers from the ballroom, each with about eighty rock crystal prisms, for use in the White House.) The house's new owners, the Russian Orthodox Church Outside of Russia, converted the four-story main house to administrative offices of the church's Synod of Bishops, converted the three-story north annex to a school, and converted the two-story ballroom wing to the Synodal Cathedral, adding a processional staircase leading down to the garden, through a new gate out to 93rd Street.

After a public hearing on November 10, 1966, the Landmarks Preservation Commission voted on January 14, 1969, to designate 75 East 93rd Street a landmark, declaring it to be "an outstanding example of a modified Federal style...one of the finest works in New York City, by the architects, Delano and Aldrich."

In 1997, with the approval of the Landmarks Preservation Commission, the building's owner restored the building's windows and replaced the mansard's slate roof and copper dormers to match the original. The architect for the project was Michael Dwyer.

== 67 East 93rd Street (1941–2020) ==
George F. Baker Jr. and his architects completed the new house at 67 East 93rd Street by the end of 1931, and by the time of the 1940 US census, his son, George F. Baker III (1915–1977), occupied the house with his wife and son, and three servants.

After a public hearing on June 25, 1974, the Landmarks Preservation Commission voted on July 23, 1974, to designate No. 67 a landmark, declaring it to be "a handsome residence designed in a modified version of the neo-Federal style."

In 1977, the estate of Edith Baker sold the house to Edward Foote Ulmann (1942–2013), the son of Alec E. Ulmann, chairman of Allied International, an exporter of aerospace products. Eddie Ulmann was a graduate of Phillips Exeter and Columbia College; an eight-time amateur national racquets doubles champion; member of numerous gentlemen's clubs; and author of a gossip column for the magazine Quest, written under the pseudonymous by-line, "Corinthus."

In 1987, Ulmann sold the house to financier, preservationist, and author Richard H. Jenrette (1929–2018), and in 1989 Jenrette sold it to the art dealer Stephen Mazoh. During his tenure, Mazoh operated an art gallery in the house, acting as agent in 1993 for the sale of Vincent van Gogh's Wheatfield with Cypresses, sold to Walter H. Annenberg for $57 million—at the time the 6th most expensive painting ever sold.

In 1996, Jenrette bought the house back from Mazoh, and used it as his New York residence until his death in April 2018. In November 2018, the Classical American Homes Preservation Trust, a foundation created by Jenrette, acquired the house.

== 69 East 93rd Street (1941–2020) ==
After a public hearing on November 10, 1966, the Landmarks Preservation Commission voted on January 14, 1969, to designate 69 East 93rd Street a landmark, declaring it to be "an outstanding example of a modified Federal style...dignified in character...spacious in conception."

On June 28, 1989, Richard Jenrette bought No. 69 from George and Edith Baker's grandson, and lived there until 1996. According to Jenrette, "The carriage house...had been turned into a single family apartment in recent years by George F. Baker IV, who lived there with his wife and family."

During his time at No. 69, Jenrette contemplated a major alteration. He wrote,

"For the next seven years (1989–1996), I lived quite happily at No. 69 East 93rd Street...I liked the light and the height of the ceilings, but the house lacked a grand ceremonial entrance staircase as I had enjoyed next door at No. 67 East 93rd Street...I even went so far as to commission Michael Dwyer, my favorite young neo-classical architect in Manhattan, to design a new interior layout. His plan 'borrowed' half the six-car garage on the first floor and would have created an elegant entrance hall and elliptical staircase ascending to the piano nobile..."

In 1996, Jenrette moved back to No. 67 and abandoned his plan to renovate No. 69. In 1997, he sold the house to Classical American Homes Preservation Trust, which used it as its headquarters until 2020.

== 67–69 East 93rd Street combined (2021–present) ==
The Classical American Homes Preservation Trust offered both No. 67 and No. 69 for sale in May 2021 for $25 million. The industrialist and magazine publisher Peter M. Brant bought both in January 2022 for $20 million.

In April 2023, the new owner offered No. 67 for sale for $23 million, and in January 2024, it was offered for sale for $19.5 million. As of July 2025, No. 67 was for sale; the asking price was $17.95 million.

== Gallery ==
=== Historic drawings, maps, and photos (prior to 2001) ===
A 1911 map showing the northwest corner of Park Avenue and 93rd Street, when it was occupied by the two buildings of the Ursuline Academy, a school for Catholic girls.

A 1916 map showing the vacant northwest corner of Park Avenue and 93rd Street, after demolition of the Ursuline Academy's school buildings, but before construction of the Francis F. Palmer House.

Plan of the Francis F. Palmer House, late 1918. A door in the wall between the house and garden leads down to the service entrance at the basement level.

Francis F. Palmer House, newly constructed in late 1918, before the additions made by George F. Baker Jr.

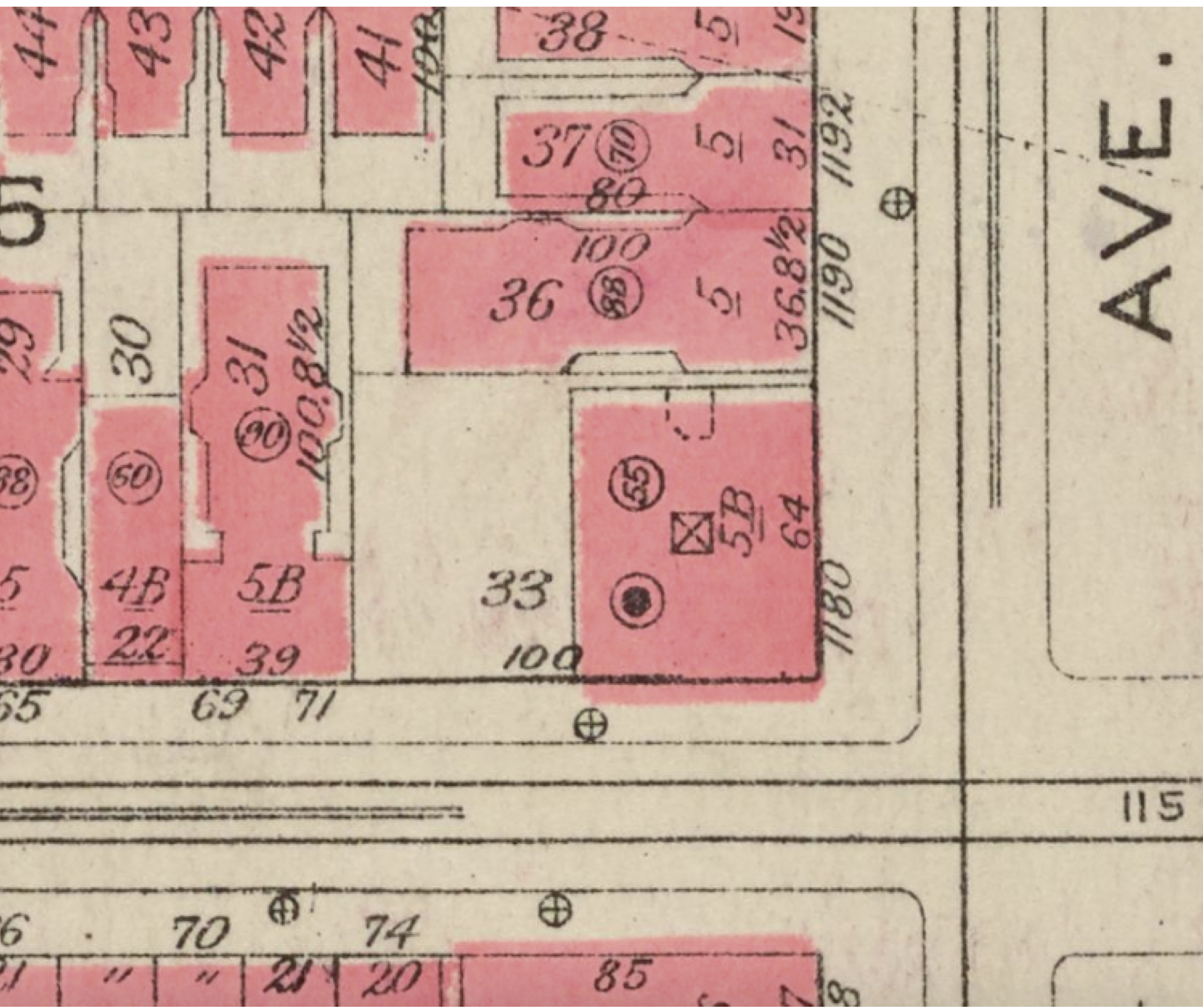
A 1923 map showing Francis F. Palmer's house on lot 33, block 1505, before George F. Baker Jr. acquired lots 30, 31, and 36, and before he built the additions of 1929–31.

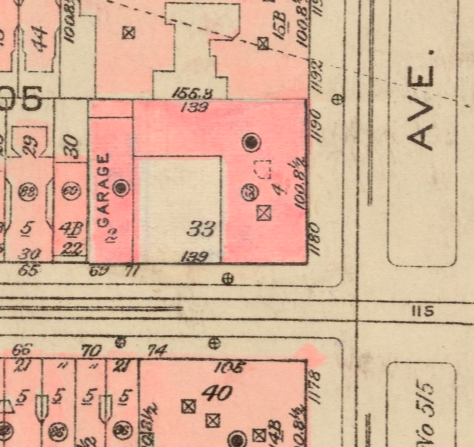
A 1927 map showing George F. Baker Jr.'s additions at 69 East 9rd St. and 1190 Park Avenue, under construction in 1927. They were completed in 1929. The number of stories shown (four) was inaccurate and corrected on later editions of the atlas.

=== Contemporary photos (2001 and after) ===
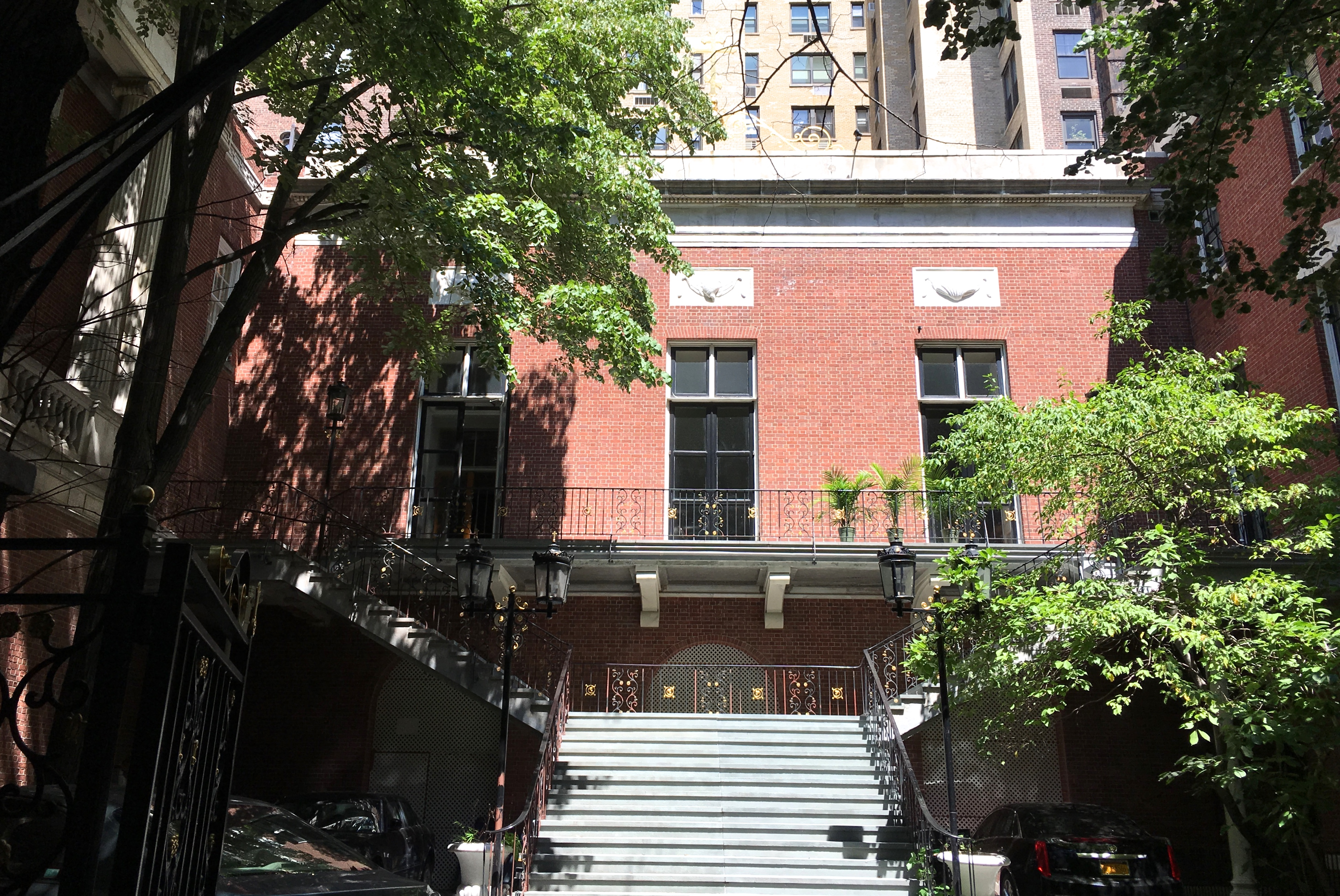
Ballroom wing at 75 East 93rd Street.

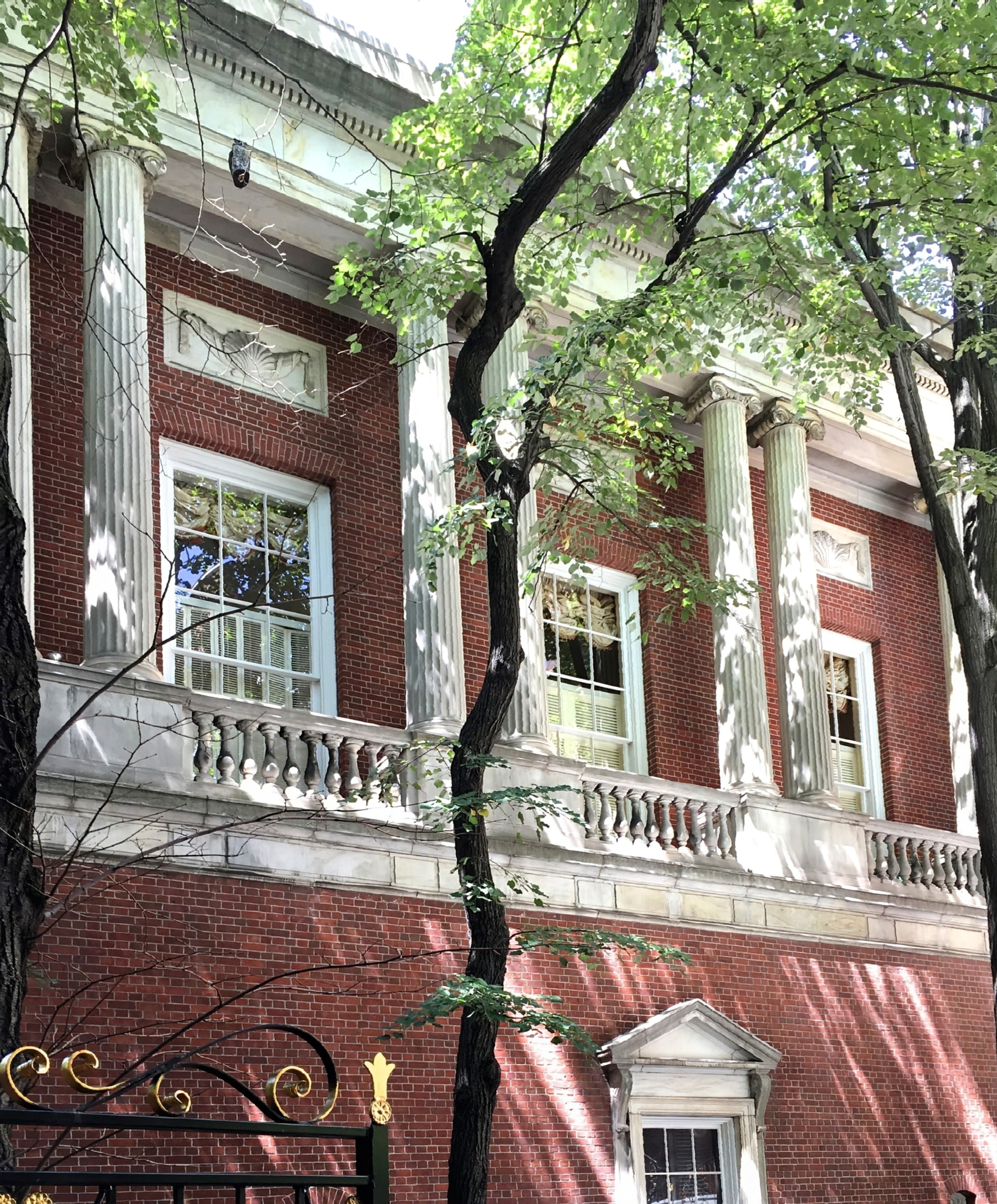
The colonnade at 69 East 93rd Street, overlooking the courtyard.

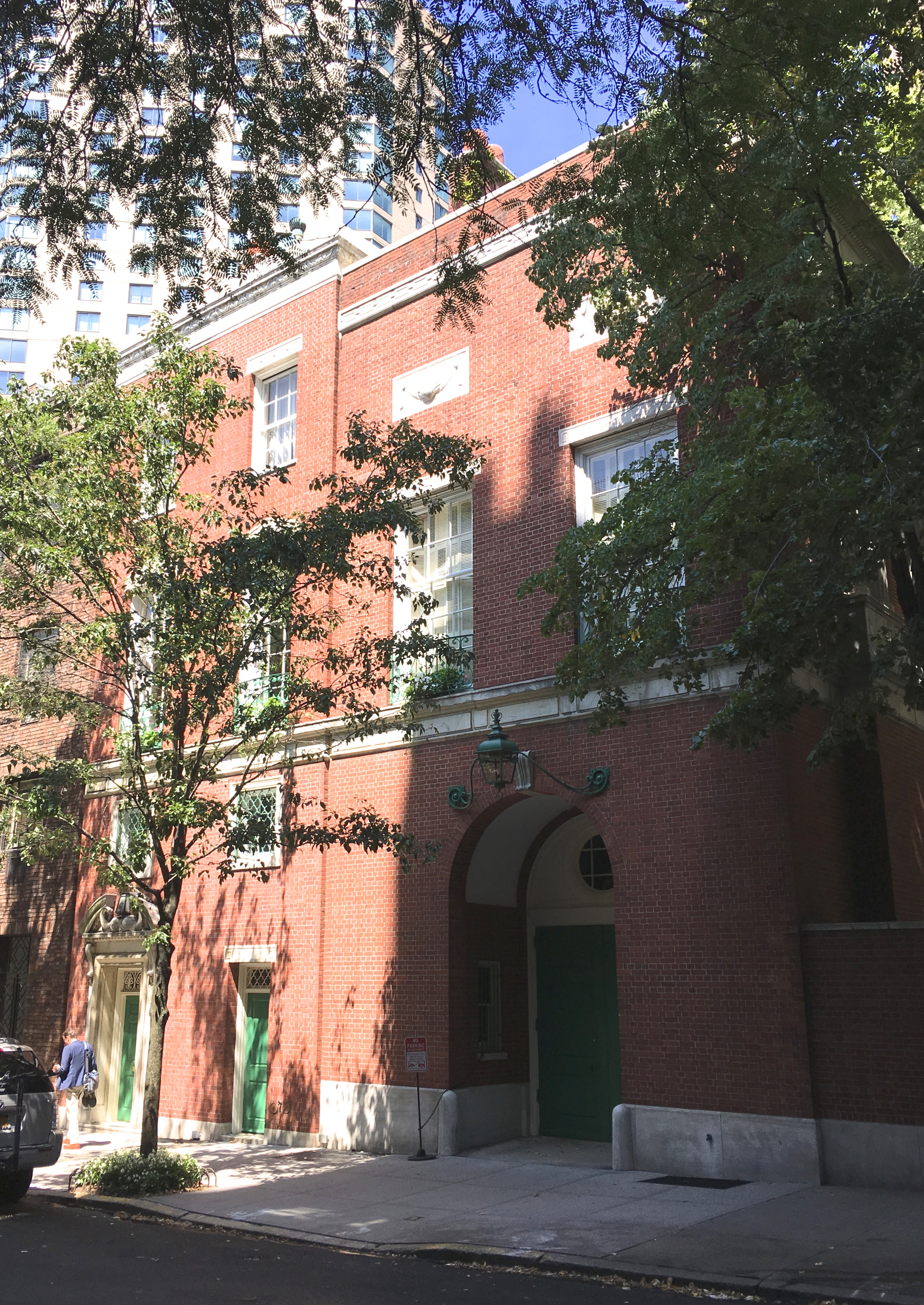
The facades of 67 & 69 East 93rd Street, New York City.

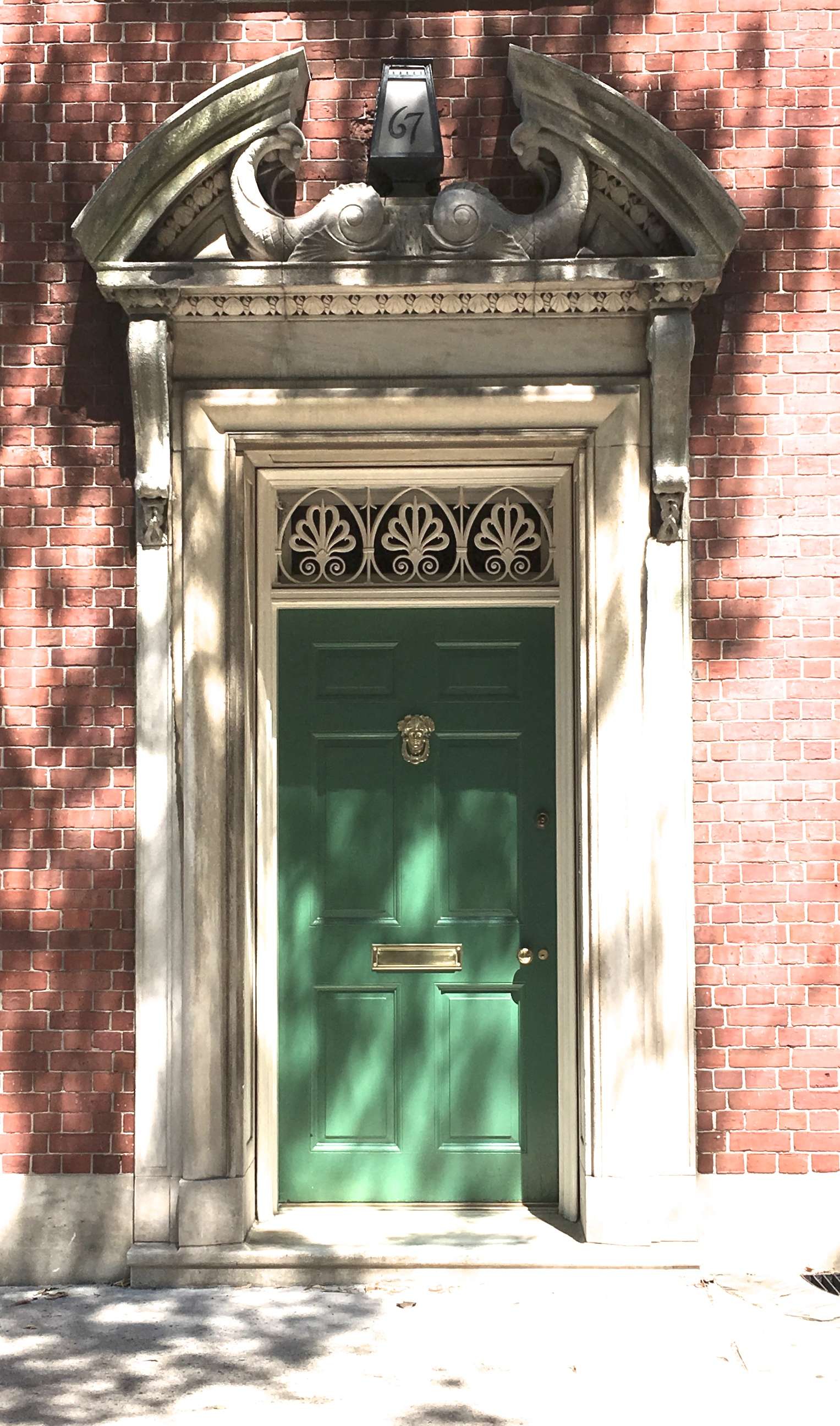
The entrance to 67 East 93rd Street.

== See also ==
- List of New York City Designated Landmarks in Manhattan from 59th to 110th Streets
- National Register of Historic Places listings in Manhattan from 59th to 110th Streets
