= Norman B. Ream =

American businessman

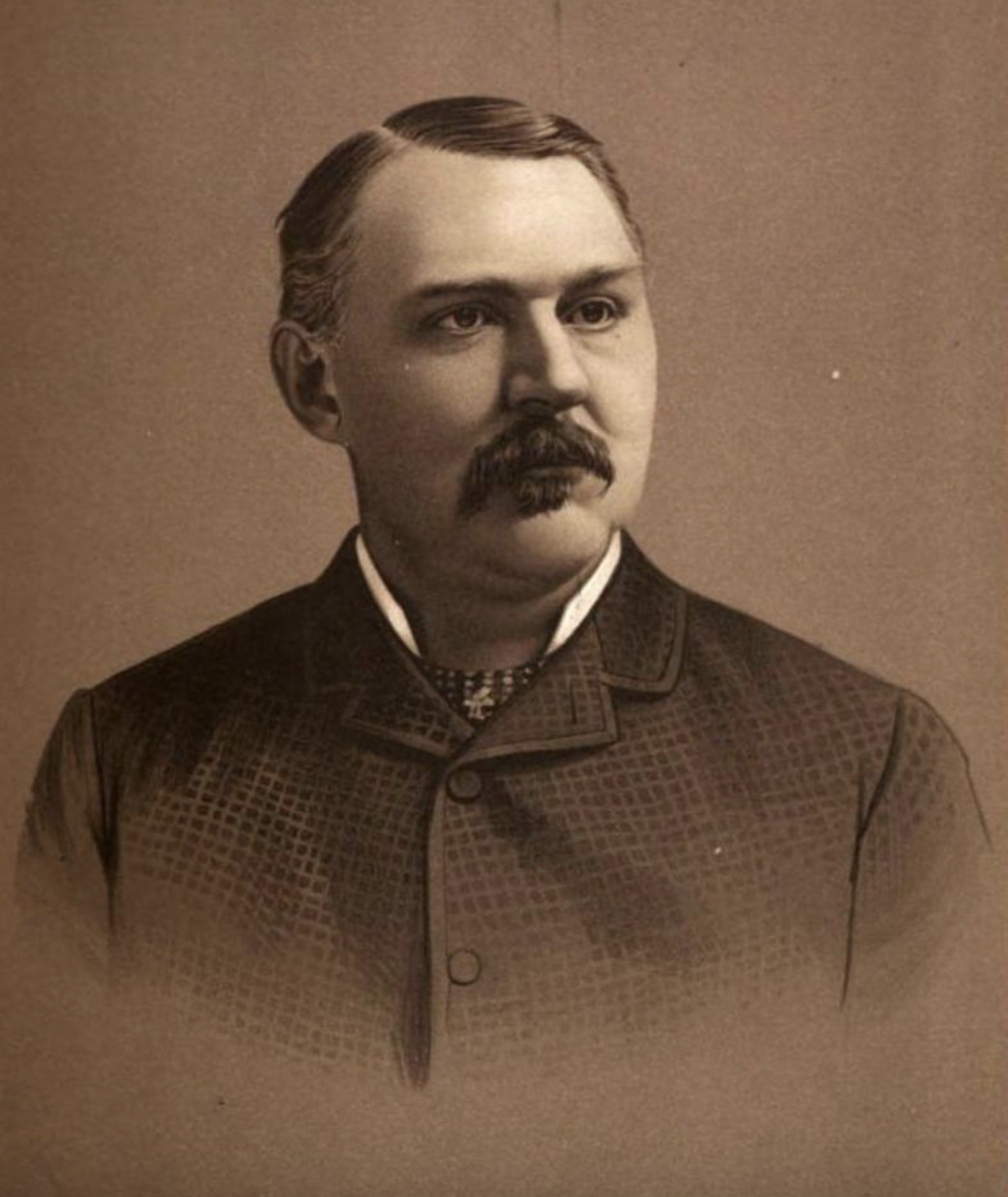
- Born: Norman Bruce Ream; November 5, 1844; Somerset County, Pennsylvania, U.S.
- Died: February 9, 1915 (aged 70); New York City, U.S.
- Resting place: Woodlawn Cemetery
- Occupation: Businessman
- Known for: Investing in steel, railroads, insurance, and banking
- Spouse: Caroline Thompson Putnam
- Children: 5 sons, 3 daughters
- Relatives: Anastasy Vonsyatsky (son-in-law)

Signature
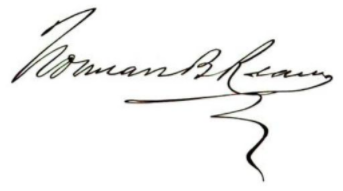

Norman Bruce Ream (1844–1915) was an American businessman. A Civil War veteran, Ream became a millionaire by investing in steel, railroads, insurance, and banking.

== Early life ==
Norman B. Ream was born on November 5, 1844, in Harnedsville, Somerset County, Pennsylvania. He was educated in public schools.

During the American Civil War of 1861–1865, he served in the 85th Pennsylvania Infantry of the Union Army. He became the youngest man to be promoted from private to First-Lieutenant in the Union Army. However, he was "incapacitated" by war wounds.

== Career ==
Shortly after the war, in 1866, Ream moved to Princeton, Illinois, where he opened a store. Later, Ream moved to Iowa, where he purchased cattle and grains on credit and sold them to farmers on credit. He ran up debt as a result of a crop failure, but managed to pay it off, and moved to Chicago in 1877. Shortly after, Ream joined the Chicago Board of Trade. Ream would rise early to talk to the people at the Union Stock Yards before the Board of Trade opened at 10AM. Over the year, Ream became an investment advisor to business magnates like J. P. Morgan, Marshall Field, George Pullman. Later, with Robert Todd Lincoln, Ream was the executor of Pullman's will.

Ream served on the board of directors of the U.S. Steel. Additionally, Ream was involved in the railroad business, serving on the board of directors of the Pullman Company, as well as the Boards of the Baltimore and Ohio Railroad, the Chicago and Erie Railroad, the Cincinnati, Hamilton and Dayton Railway, the Erie Railroad, the New York, Susquehanna and Western Railway, the Pere Marquette Railway, and the Seaboard Air Line Railroad.

Ream was also active in the insurance business, serving on the Boards of the Equitable Life Assurance Society of the United States and the Reliance Company, as well as banking, serving on the Boards of the First Financial Bank of Chicago and the New York Trust Company (later merged with Chemical Bank, now known as JPMorgan Chase).

Ream also served on the board of directors of the National Biscuit Company, later known as Nabisco, now a subsidiary of Mondelēz International. Additionally, Ream served on the Boards of the Central Safety Deposit Company, the Metropolitan Trust Company, the Fidelity-Phoenix Fire Assurance Company, the Securities Company, the Cumberland Corporation, the Sussex Realty Company, the Franco-American Financial Association, etc.

== Philanthropy ==
Ream helped Chicago recover from its fire in 1871. Additionally, he served on the board of trustees of the Field Columbian Museum in Chicago. Meanwhile, his wife attended fundraisers for Bryn Mawr College, a women's college in Bryn Mawr, Pennsylvania.

== Personal life ==
Ream married Caroline Thompson Putnam in 1876 in Madison, New York. They resided at 1901 Prairie Avenue in Chicago. They had several children.

One of his sons, Robert Ream, married Mabel Wrightson, the daughter of Reverend W. G. Wrightson and sister of Harry Wrightson, in Cuckfield, West Sussex, in 1907. Another son, Louis, who graduated from Princeton University and worked for the New York Trust Company, also eloped, marrying Eleanor Pendleton, a stage actress. When they divorced in 1918, she received an alimony of US$210,000. Meanwhile, Edwin King Ream, eloped and married Nellie Speed Armstrong, the granddaughter of James Speed, who served as the 27th United States Attorney General, in 1911. Yet another son, Norman P. Ream, married Mary Green, the daughter of Adolphus W. Green, the founder of the National Biscuit Company on whose board Ream had served, in 1916. Ream notably built an Estate in Thompson, CT in 1899. In 1931, the Ream Estate notably became part of Marianapolis Preparatory School. The Main House mostly burned down March 5, 1964, and was later rebuilt.

A daughter, Frances Matt, married John L. Kemmerer. Another daughter, Marion Buckingham Ream, first married Redmond B. Stevens, and later Anastasy Vonsyatsky, a Polish-born fascist leader.

== Death and legacy ==
Ream died on February 9, 1915, at the Presbyterian Hospital in New York City. His funeral took place at the St. George's Episcopal Church. His pallbearers included Adolphus W. Green and Elbert Henry Gary. He was buried at the Woodlawn Cemetery in The Bronx, New York City.

At the time of his death, he was worth between US$50 million and US$75 million. He was one of the twenty-five richest men in the United States. After his death, his widow resided at 903 Park Avenue on the Upper East Side of Manhattan.
