= 903 Park Avenue =

Residential building in Manhattan, New York

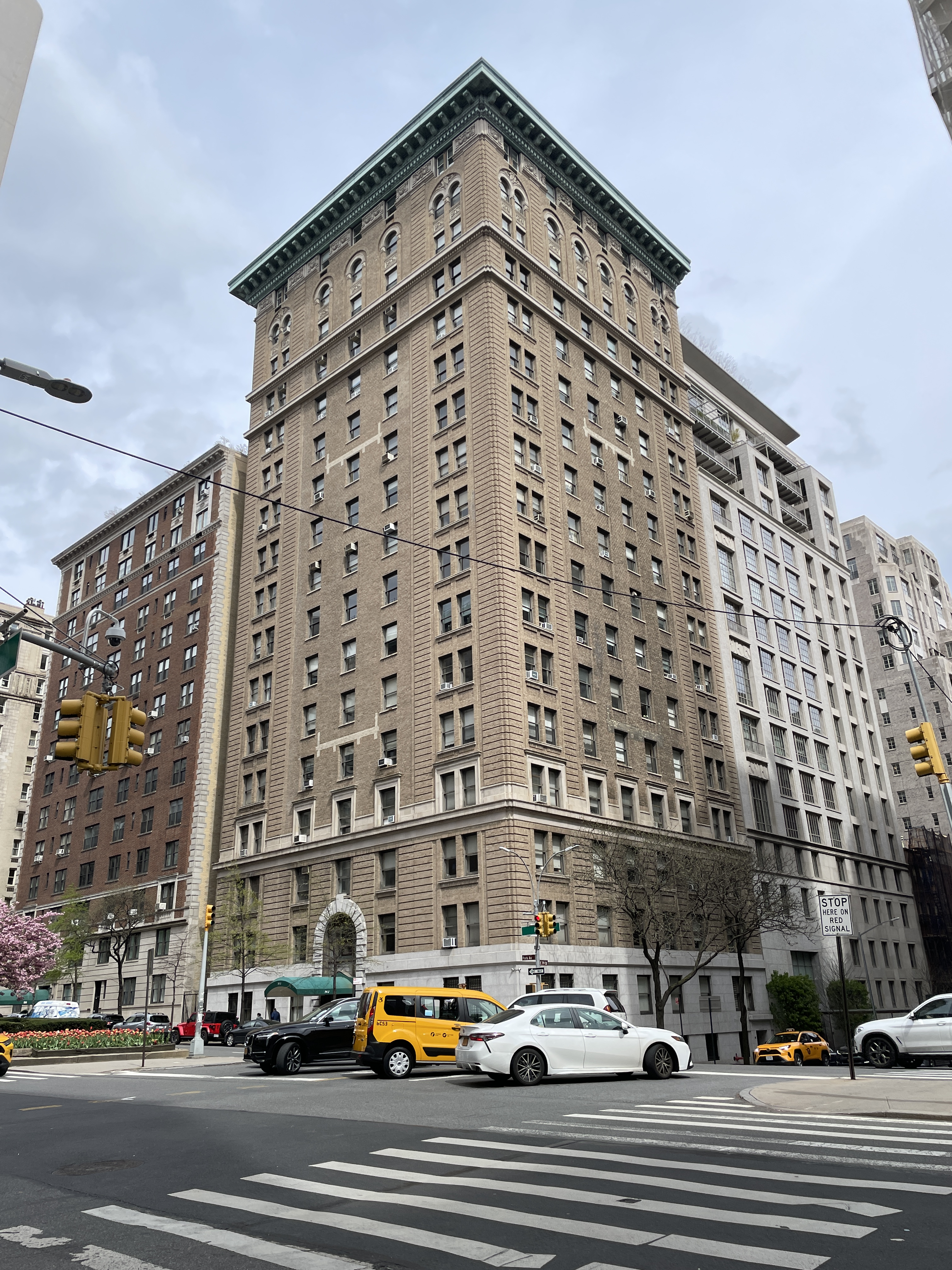
- 903 Park Avenue in 2024.

General information
- Type: Residential
- Location: 901-907 Park Avenue, Upper East Side, Manhattan, New York City, New York
- Construction started: 1912
- Completed: 1914

Height
- Height: 188.29 feet (57.39 m)

Technical details
- Floor count: 17

Design and construction
- Architects: Robert T. Lyons; Warren & Wetmore
- 903 Park Avenue
- U.S. Historic district – Contributing property
- Location within New York City Location within New York Location within the United States
- Location: New York City
- Coordinates: 40°46′32.6″N 73°57′36.3″W
- Part of: Park Avenue Historic District (ID10000588)
- Added to NRHP: August 29, 2010

903 Park Avenue is a 17-story residential building on Park Avenue on the Upper East Side of Manhattan, New York City.

== Location ==
The building is located on the corner of 903 Park Avenue (where the main entrance is) and East 79th Street.

== History ==
The building was erected from 1912 to 1914 by the construction firm Bing & Bing. It was designed by architect Robert T. Lyons. At the time of its construction, 903 Park Ave was said to be the tallest residential building in New York City.

It was acquired by Maria DeWitt Jesup, the widow of banker Morris Ketchum Jesup, in 1914. Physician and railroad investor William Seward Webb was an early tenant. In 1916, the widow and son of financial investor Norman B. Ream were also tenants.

In 1917, the building was acquired by Vincent Astor. By the 1930s, Walter Hoving was a tenant.

In 2002, the building was owned by Stahl Real Estate.

== Architectural significance ==
The building is 188 feet (57 m) high, with seventeen floors. As part of the Park Avenue Historic District, it has been listed on the National Register of Historic Places since August 29, 2010.
