= Thorne and Eddy Estates =

- U.S. National Register of Historic Places
- New Jersey Register of Historic Places
- Location within Morris County, New Jersey Location within New Jersey Location within the United States
- Location: Normandy Heights Road, Morris Township, New Jersey
- Nearest city: Morristown, New Jersey
- Coordinates: 40°47′42″N 74°26′40″W
- Area: 11 acres (4.5 ha)
- Architect: Delano & Aldrich
- Architectural style: Classical Revival, Shingle Style
- NRHP reference No.: 78001783
- NJRHP No.: 2178

Significant dates
- Added to NRHP: December 14, 1978
- Designated NJRHP: April 15, 1978

The Thorne and Eddy Estates are located along Normandy Heights Road, near Morristown, in Morris Township of Morris County, New Jersey, United States. The Thorne Mansion, located at 21 Normandy Heights Road, was built in 1912 and the Eddy Mansion, located at 45 Normandy Heights Road, was built in 1896. They were added to the National Register of Historic Places on December 14, 1978, for their significance in architecture, commerce, and social history. The listing also includes the carriage houses of the mansions.

== Thorne Estate ==
The Thorne Mansion, also known as Thorne Oaks, was built in 1912 for William V.S. Thorne, a wealthy financier in the railroad industry. The red brick house was designed by the architectural firm Delano & Aldrich and features neo-Georgian style. It is currently the headquarters for the Morristown Unitarian Universalist Fellowship. The Thorne Carriage House is also built with red brick and has an L shape.

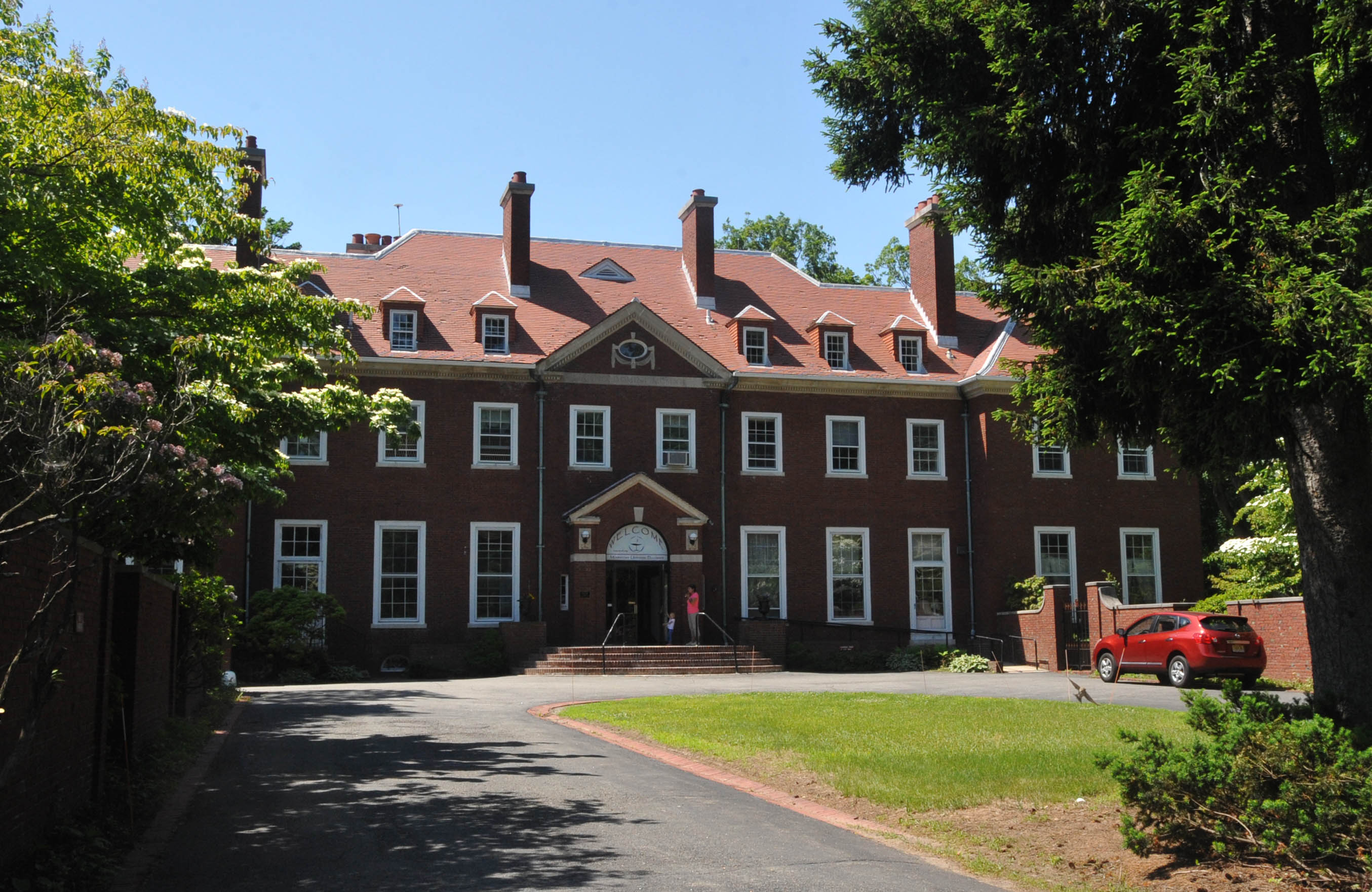
Thorne Mansion

== Eddy Estate ==
The Eddy Mansion, also known as Valley View, was built in 1896 for Jesse Leeds Eddy, a wealthy businessman in the anthracite coal industry. The summer cottage was designed by local architect, George Augustus Mills, with Shingle style. It was built using Vermont granite and natural shingle. The Eddy Carriage House shares many on the architectural features of the main house.

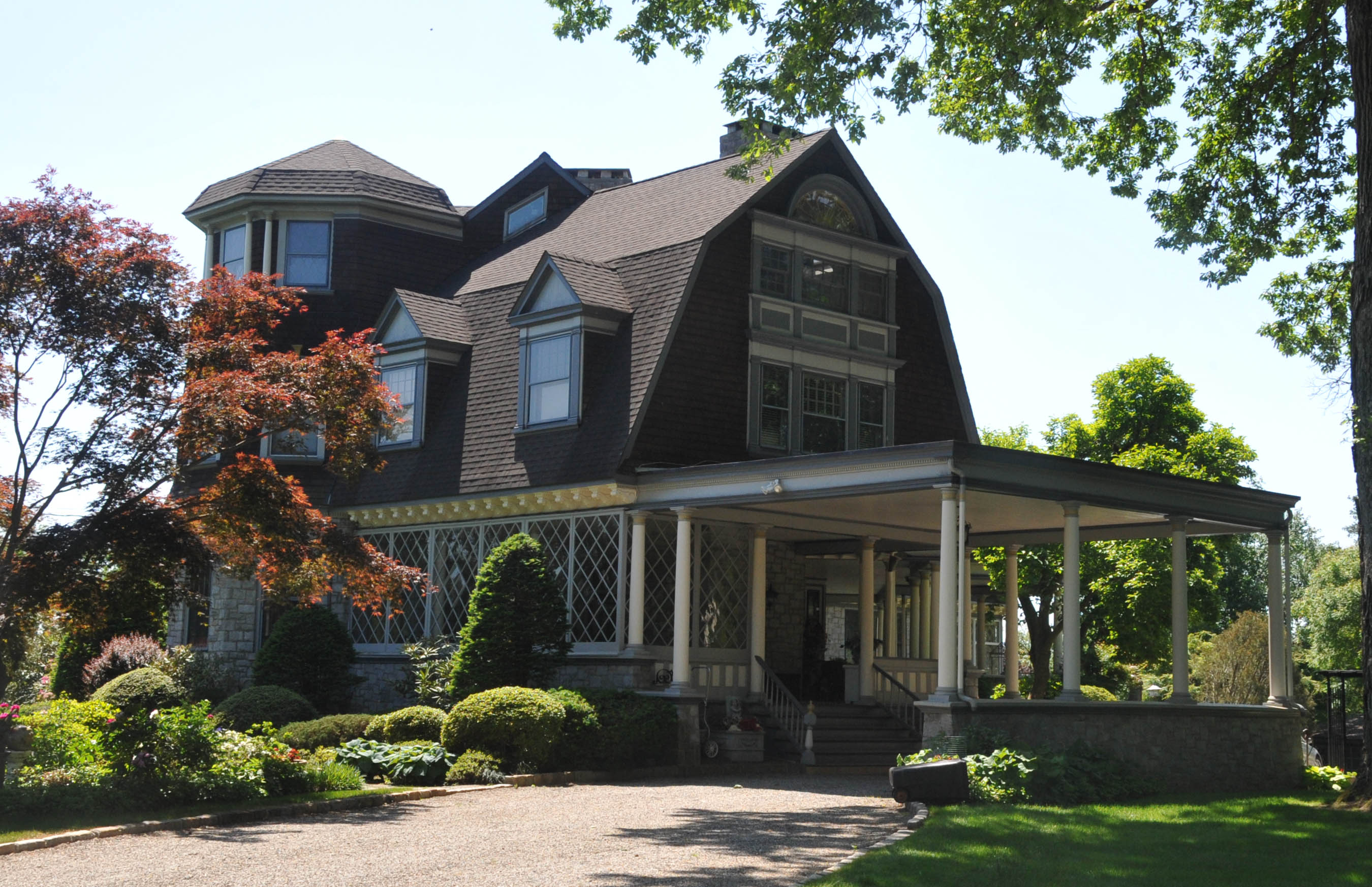
Eddy Mansion

== See also ==
- National Register of Historic Places listings in Morris County, New Jersey
