= Chester Holmes Aldrich =

American architect (1871–1940)

- Born: June 4, 1871; Providence, Rhode Island, U.S.
- Died: December 26, 1940 (aged 69); Rome, Italy
- Education: Columbia University; École des Beaux-Arts
- Occupation: Architect
- Relatives: Richard Aldrich (brother)
- Awards: Fellow of the American Institute of Architects; Order of the Crown of Italy; Order of Saints Maurice and Lazarus
- Practice: Delano & Aldrich
- Buildings: Kykuit; Colony Club; Walters Art Gallery

Chester Holmes Aldrich (4 June 1871 – 26 December 1940) was an American architect and director of the American Academy in Rome.

== Early life ==
Aldrich was born in Providence, Rhode Island. He was the third son of Anna Elizabeth (née Gladding) and Elisha Smith Aldrich, a dry-goods merchant. His maternal grandfather was a Providence ship captain. He was also a distant relative of Senator Nelson W. Aldrich.

As a child, he was a member of the Providence Art Club. He attended Columbia University, graduating in 1893 with a Bachelor of Philosophy degree in architecture. While at Columbia, he was a member of the literary Fraternity of Delta Psi (St. Anthony Hall).

After graduating from Columbia, he spent two years abroad studying and sketching. He then enrolled in the École des Beaux-Arts in Paris in 1895, receiving several medals by his second year.

In 1898, he came home to Rhode Island because his parents were both seriously ill. He worked for New York architects Carrère and Hastings for a year. While there, he produced watercolor drawings for the firm's successful entry into the New York Public Library design competition. He returned to Paris and received his degree from the École des Beaux-Arts in 1900.

== Career ==
After graduating from École des Beaux-Arts, Aldrich again worked for Carrère and Hastings. In 1903, he founded Delano & Aldrich with William Adams Delano, a former coworker from Carrère and Hastings. Delano had also attended the École des Beaux-Arts, graduating in 1902. At first, they worked out of their former employer's offices. When they located their practice on the third floor of a house in New York City, they used tables on loan from his former employer, Thomas Hastings. Eventually, their practice was located at 126 East 38th Street in a former stable and dairy that they converted into three-stories.

From this modest start, Delano & Aldrich became "one of the most productive and accomplished architectural practices in the first half of the twentieth century in America." By 1915, they were the main firm designing clubs in New York City. Examples included The Brook, the Colony Club, the Union Club, and the Knickerbocker Club. Together they are responsible for designing some of the most famous Beaux-Arts buildings in New York; including Kykuit mansion at the Rockefeller estate in Westchester County, and the U.S. Pavilion at the Venice Biennale for the Grand Central Art Galleries. However, only 33 buildings are credited as principal works of Aldrich. Some of these include the Charles Lindbergh home in Hopewell, New Jersey; the Kips Bay Boys Club in New York City; the Colony Club in New York City; the Chapin School in New York City; the Walters Art Gallery in Baltimore, Maryland; the Philadelphia Orphanage in Wallingford, Pennsylvania; Wright Memorial Dormitory and Day Missions Library at Yale University; and the Russell Sage Music Hall at Northfield, Massachusetts.

In 1935, he left Delano and Aldrich to head the American Academy in Rome. He worked in that capacity until he died in 1940. However, Delano did not change the name of the firm. Delano said, "In all the years I've worked with him [Aldrich], admiration had just kept on growing. I've never seen his enthusiasm flag, I've never seen his ideas grow stale, I've never seen his taste waiver, and chief of all, I've never seen him slacken in that thing which we're always told is the very essence of genius—the 'infinite capacity for taking pains.'"

== Professional affiliations ==
Aldrich was a fellow of the American Institute of Architects. He was elected to the National Academy of Design as an associate member in 1928 and made a full member in 1939. Other memberships included the National Institute of Arts and Letters, the Beaux Arts Society, and the Architectural League.

== Awards and honors ==
- Italy awarded Aldrich the Order of the Crown of Italy for his work with the American Red Cross Commission.
- He was a knight of the Order of Saints Maurice and Lazarus.
- He received an honorary doctorate from Columbia University in 1903.
- Aldrich's records from the American Academy in Rome are housed in the Smithsonian Institution.
- Aldrich's correspondence is held by the Avery Architectural and Fine Arts Library at Columbia University.

== Personal life ==
Aldrich never married but lived with his sister Amey, who shared his interest in social work. From 1917 to 1919, during World War I, he was the director general for civil affairs of the American Red Cross Commission to Italy.

For twenty years, Aldrich was the president of the Kips Bay Boys Club. He was a board member of the Greenwich Settlement House, the Third Street Music School Settlement, and the American Red Cross. He also founded his charity, Aldrich Farms, a Staten Island country retreat for boys requiring rehabilitation after being discharged from New York City hospitals.

He was a member of the Century Association, The Coffee House Club, the Digressionists, and the St. Anthony Club of New York. He was also president of the New York branch of Tribute to Italy and vice-president of the Italy-America Society.

The Rhode Island School of Design Museum and the Fogg Art Museum of Harvard University exhibited his paintings after his death.

In 1940, Aldrich died in Rome at the age of 69. His funeral was held at Campo Cestio. He was buried at Swan Point Cemetery in Providence, Rhode Island.
