= Delano & Aldrich =

American architectural firm

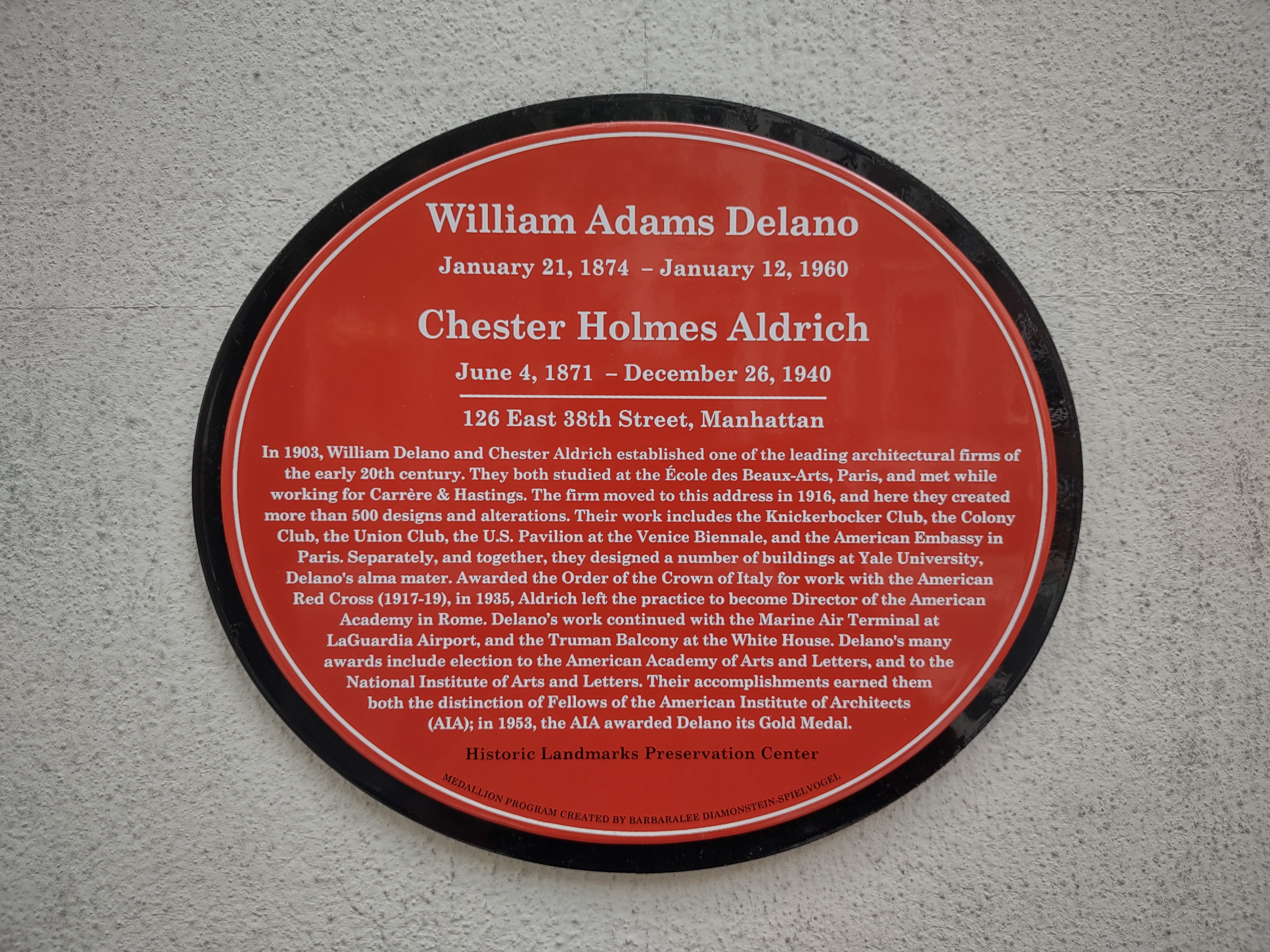
Plaque on former headquarters building

Delano & Aldrich was an American Beaux-Arts architectural firm based in New York City. Many of its clients were among the wealthiest and most powerful families in the state. Founded in 1903, the firm operated as a partnership until 1935, when Aldrich left for an appointment in Rome. Delano continued in his practice nearly until his death in 1960.

== History ==
The firm was founded in 1903 by William Adams Delano and Chester Holmes Aldrich, who met when they worked together at the office of Carrère and Hastings in the years before the turn of the 20th century.

Almost immediately after they formed their new firm, they won commissions from the Rockefeller family, among others. Delano & Aldrich tended to adapt conservative Georgian and Federal architectural styles for their townhouses, churches, schools, and a spate of social clubs for the Astors, Vanderbilts, and the Whitneys. Separately (Delano was the more prolific) and in tandem, they designed a number of buildings at Yale.

Their work was part of the architecture event in the art competition at the 1928 Summer Olympics.

Aldrich left the partnership in 1935 to become the resident director of the American Academy at Rome, where he died in 1940. Delano continued to practice almost until his death in 1960.

== Buildings ==
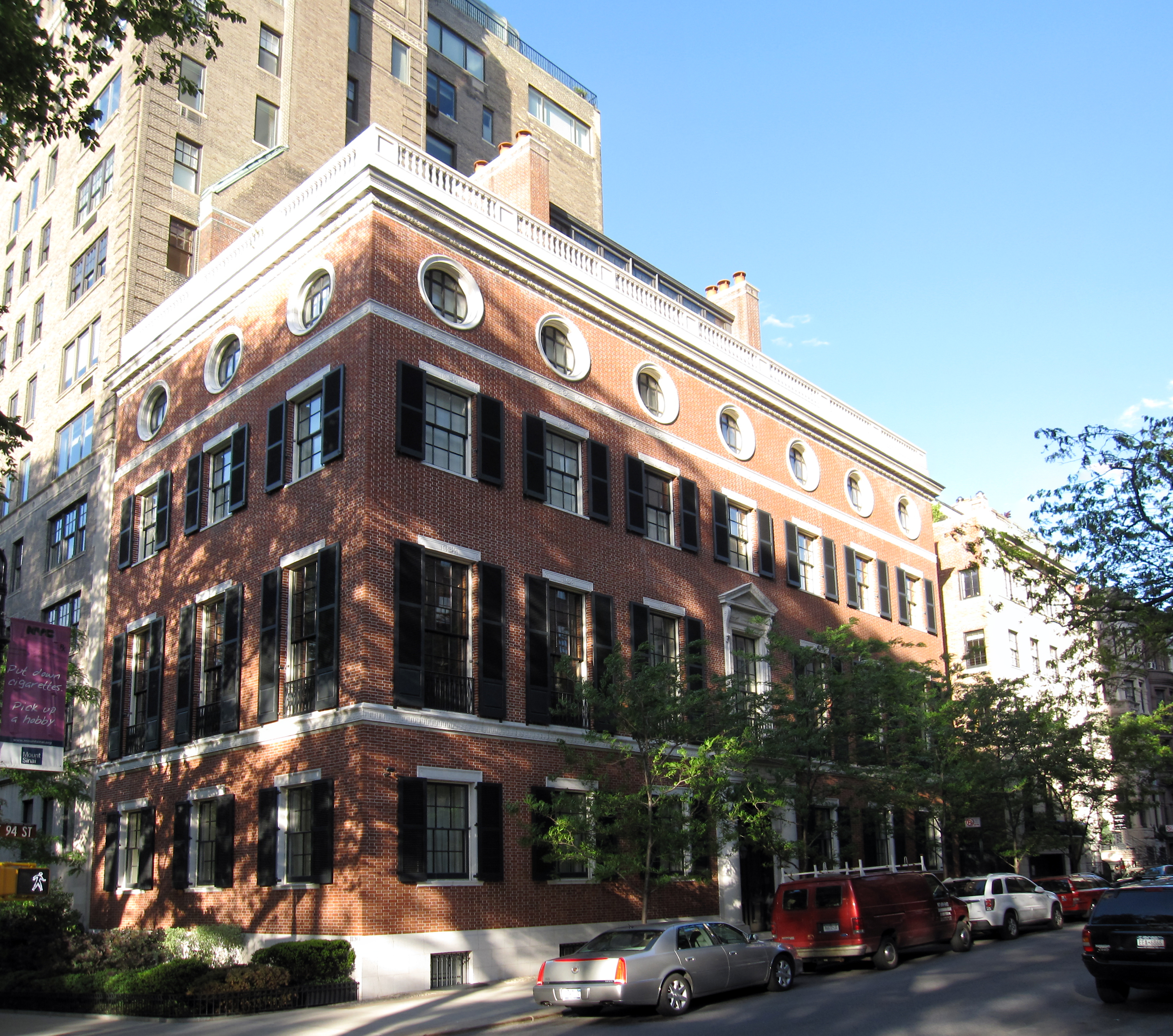
Willard D. Straight House

Surviving buildings (all in New York City unless noted):

- 63 Wall Street, 1929. Vertical bands of windows alternate with ashlar limestone cladding in setbacks to a penthouse with Art Deco gargoyles.
- 1040 Park Avenue, at 86th, apartment building, 1924. In low relief along a classical frieze, tortoises alternate with hares. Condé Nast took the penthouse.
- Alpha Chi Rho, now part of the Yale School of Drama, New Haven, CT, 1930.
- American Embassy, Paris, 1931
- Barbey Building, 15 West 38th Street, 1909.
- Belair Mansion, major renovation, in Bowie, Maryland, 1914.
- The Brook, 111 East 54th Street, 1925
- Brookville Reformed Church, Brookville, NY, 1924
- Boxwood Lodge, near Mocksville, North Carolina, 1933–1934
- (Center for Inter-American Relations), 1911. Neo-Federal townhouse, part of a harmonious row continuing a theme set by McKim, Mead, and White next door, in the first flush of buildings along Park Avenue, formed by covering over New York Central tracks in the area.
- Chapin School, at 84th and East End Avenue, 1928. Neo-Georgian
- Chelsea, the Benjamin Moore Estate, Muttontown, New York, 1923.
- Colony Club, 62nd and Park Avenue, 1916.
- Confederate Defenders of Charleston, Charleston, SC, 1932.
- Cushing Memorial Gallery, Newport, Rhode Island, 1919.
- Cutting Houses, 12 to 16 East 89th Street, 1919.
- Dawes House, Lawrenceville School, Lawrenceville NJ, opened November 1929
- Embassy of Japan in Washington, D.C., 1931
- Fathers Building, The Lawrenceville School, Lawrenceville, NJ, dedicated September 1925.
- Ferry Building, U.S. Immigration Station, Ellis Island, New York Harbor, 1935–1936
- William L. Harkness Hall, Yale University, New Haven, CT, 1927. Collegiate Gothic.
- Interiors of the Grand Central Art Galleries, New York, 1922.
- Greenwich House, 1917. The community later added two floors to this center, stretching the Georgian townhouse manner to the limit.
- Hathaway, Tannersville, New York, 1907.
- High Lawn, (Lenox, Massachusetts), a wedding gift for William B. Osgood Field and his wife, Lila Sloane Field, 1908; one of the "Berkshire Cottages", with bas-reliefs by the bride's cousin Gertrude Vanderbilt Whitney.
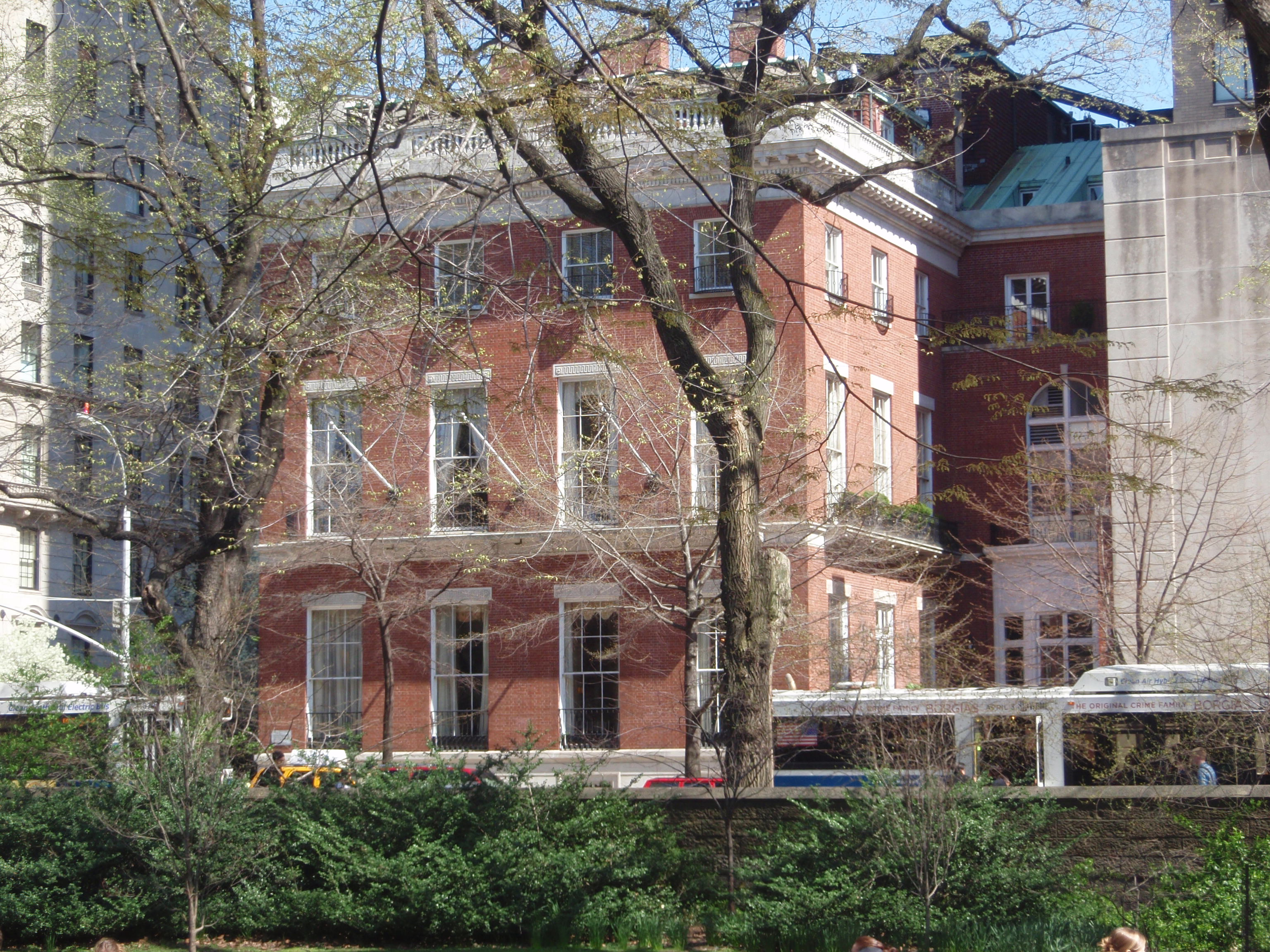
- The Knickerbocker Club, New York
  Knickerbocker Club, 62nd and Fifth Avenue, 1915. A discreet Federal townhouse on Fifth Avenue.
- Kykuit, the principal Classical Revival mansion in the Rockefeller family estate, Sleepy Hollow, New York, 1913.
- McPherson Infirmary, The Lawrenceville School, Lawrenceville, NJ, 1929
- New Post Office Department, Washington, D.C., 1934
- Oheka, Huntington, New York, 1919.
- Francis F. Palmer House (later George F. Baker, Jr. House), 75 East 93rd Street at Park Avenue, 1918 (altered with a ballroom wing added in 1928).
- Pan American Airways System Terminal Building (now Miami City Hall), Dinner Key in Miami, Florida, 1933
- The U.S. Pavilion at the Venice Biennale, 1930. Designed with Chester Holmes Aldrich, the building was constructed of Istrian marble and pink brick.
- "Peterloon," Indian Hill, Ohio, for John J. Emery, 1931
- Harold Pratt House, 68th and Park, 1920, built for Harold I. Pratt; it is now headquarters of the Council on Foreign Relations.
- Raymond House, Lawrenceville School, Lawrenceville, NJ, opened April 1930
- Sage-Bowers Hall, Yale School of Forestry, New Haven, CT, 1924 (Sage), 1931 (Bowers). Two buildings in brownstone Collegiate Gothic style.
- Sterling Chemistry Lab, Science Hill, Yale University, New Haven, CT, 1923.
- Sterling Divinity Quadrangle, Yale Divinity School, New Haven, CT, 1932. Georgian colonial group of buildings.
- St. Bernard's School, 98th Street, 1915.
- Willard D. Straight House, 5th Avenue, 1914. Later used as the headquarters of the National Audubon Society and the International Center for Photography. An English brick block, in the manner of Sir Christopher Wren at Hampton Court, was Americanized with black shutters.
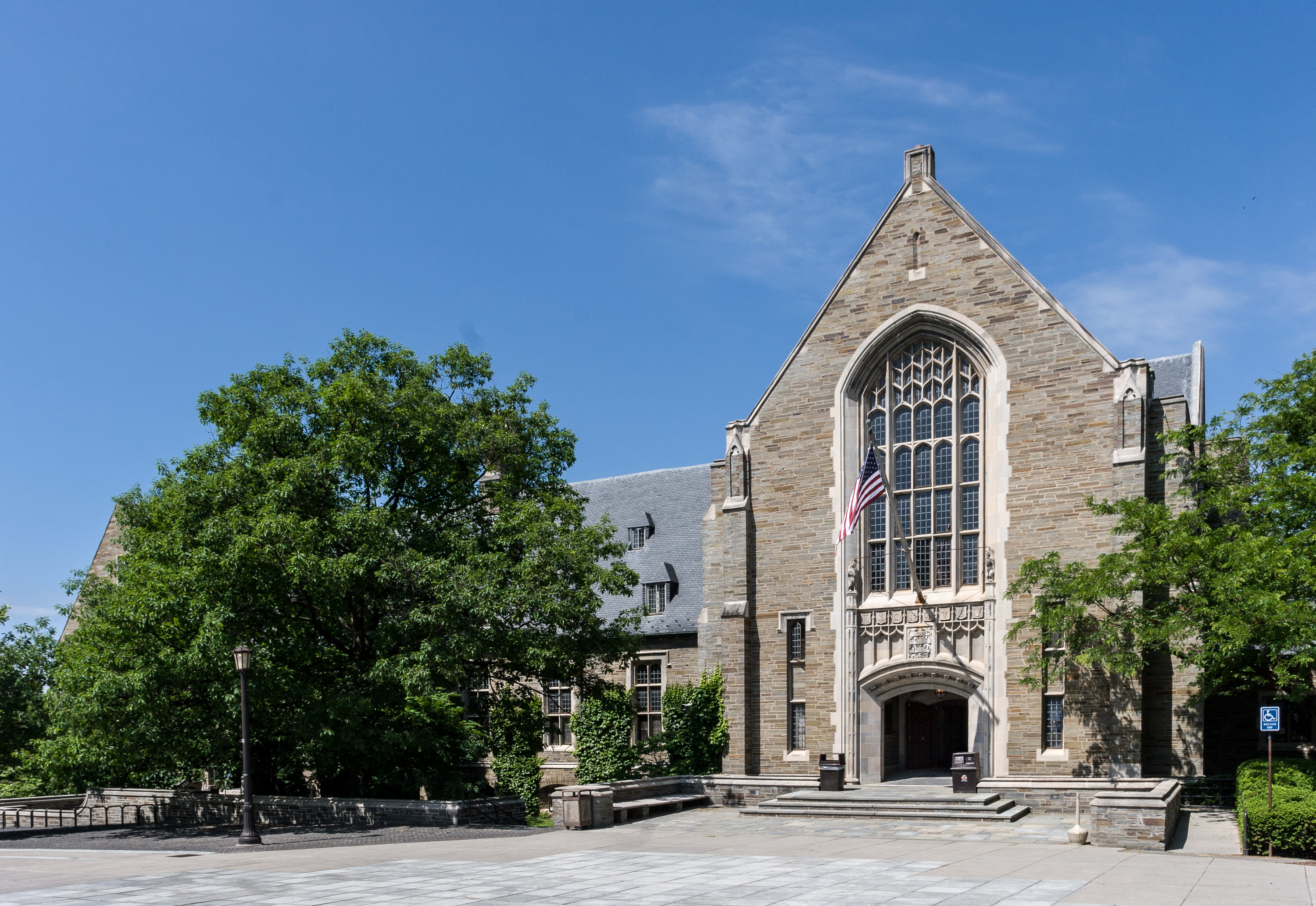
- Willard Straight Hall (1925)
  Willard Straight Hall, Cornell University, Ithaca, NY, 1925. Collegiate Gothic.
- Third Church of Christ, Scientist; Park Avenue at 63rd Street, 1924.
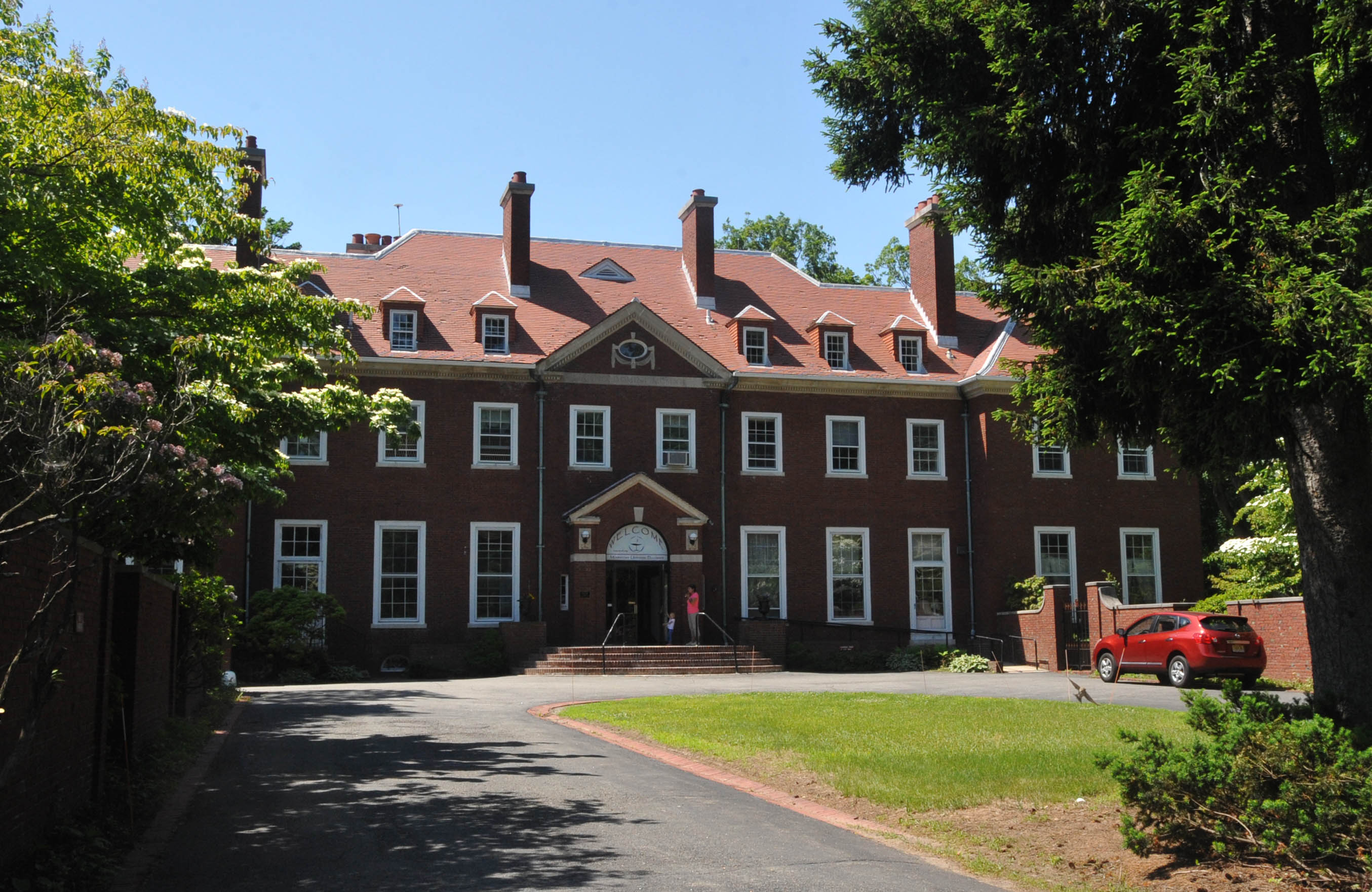
- Thorne Mansion (1912)
  Thorne Mansion, Morris Township, NJ (1912)
- Union Club, 69th and Park Avenue, 1933. A smoothly rusticated Italianate limestone palazzo in the manner of London clubs of the 19th century, "one of the last great monuments of the American Renaissance".
- U.S. Post Office, Glen Cove, New York, 1932
- Walters Art Museum, Baltimore, 1910. Their first major public commission.
- Frank Porter Wood home, Toronto, 1931. Now Crescent School.
- Woodside (demolished), (Syosset, New York), for James A. Burden and his wife, Florence, 1916. The architects worked the spirit of Annapolis's Whitehall, a 1760 plantation house, into the design.
- Wright Memorial Hall (now Lanman-Wright Hall), Old Campus, Yale University, New Haven, CT, 1912. Brownstone Collegiate Gothic.

== Archives ==
The Delano & Aldrich archive is held by the Drawings and Archives Department in the Avery Architectural and Fine Arts Library at Columbia University. Some historical records of Delano & Aldrich's work on the Wall Street headquarters of Brown Brothers Harriman are included in the Brown Brothers Harriman Collection housed in the manuscript collections at New-York Historical Society.
